= Church Statute of Prince Vladimir =

Оуставъ с(вя)т(о)го кн(я)зя Володимира, кр(е)стившаго Роусьскую землю, о ц(ерк)о(в)ныхъ соудех
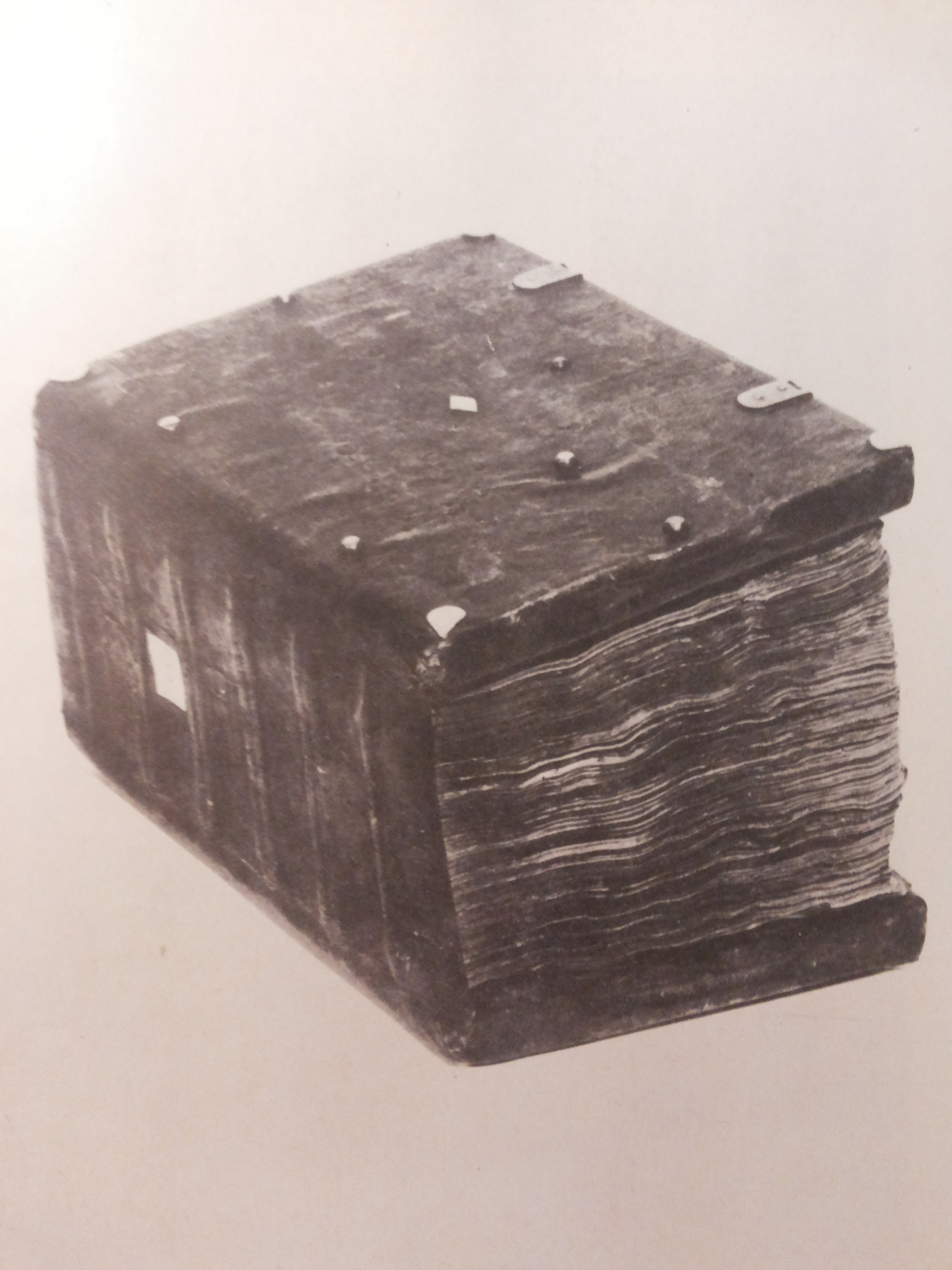
- Synodic Kormchaia of 1282 (Novgorod), containing the oldest surviving copy of Statute of Vladimir among other articles
- Created: from the beginning of the 12th century.
- Author(s): prince`s administration and churchmen.
- Purpose: guidance for the church court.

Church Statute of Prince Volodimir (Note: Old East Slavic: Оуставъ с(вя)т(о)го кн(я)зя Володимира, romanized: Oustavʺ s(vja)t(o)go kn(ja)zja Volodimira "The Statute of Holy Prince Volodimir". Russian: Церковный устав Владимира, romanized: Cerkovnyj ustav Vladimira "Vladimir's Church Statute". Ukrainian: Церковний статут Володимира, romanized: Cerkovnyj statut Volodymyra "Volodymyr's Church Statute".) is a source of church law in Old Rus', defined legal authority of church and legal status of clergy by the state: prince (knyaz) and his administration. Vladimir's Statute was a short legal code, regulated relationship between the church and the state, including demarcation of jurisdiction between church and princely courts, and defined index of persons and organizations within the church jurisdiction. The church also got under its supervision the system of weights and measures, and monthly support: tithe from all princely income. The statute was written at the beginning of the 12th century and remade during many centuries. The statute was written in Old Church Slavonic and Old East Slavic. It was one of the first church sources of Kievan Rus' law. The Church Statute of Prince Yaroslav and other Kievan Rus' princely statutes served closely related purposes. One of the sources of the statute was Byzantine law, including the Kormchaia (derived from a Byzantine nomocanon).

The statute opens with the words: "Behold, I, Prince Vasilii, called Volodimir," (Old East Slavic: Се аз, князь Василий, нарицаемыи Володимир, romanized: Se yaz, knyaz' Vasilii, naritsayemy Volodimir,) "son of Sviatoslav (...) having consulted with my Princess Anna and with my children".

== Dating ==
It is not precisely known when the text of the Statute was first written. Scholars Evgeniy Bolkhovitinov, Konstantin Nevolin, Makariy (Bulgakov), Vasily Klyuchevsky, Vladimir Beneshevich, Aleksandr Lototskiy, George Vernadsky and Mikhail Tikhomirov considered that the statute went back to the era of Kievan Rus' before the Mongol invasion (before 1237). Serafim Yushkov, Aleksandr Zimin and Yaroslav Schapov referred the archetype of the statute to the beginning or to the first half of the 12th century. Nikolay Karamzin, Yevgeny Golubinsky attributed the basis of the statute to the 13th century; Altksey Pavlov to the 14th century. Serafim Yushkov (1925) considered that the basis was a short "confirmative" charter (gramota) by prince Volodimir (the end of the 10th – the beginning of the 11th centuries), authorized use of church law and defined scope of jurisdiction of the Rus' church. Yushkov reconstructed this charter: a part of the lawsuits were passed from the princes, boyars and their judges to the church and the bishops. According to Yushkov, the protograph of the first and second redactions was formed at the beginning of the 12th century, also reconstructed by the scholar.

The Statute of Vladimir had a wide distribution within Kievan Rus', and was also known abroad. Development of the statute redactions reflects evolution of Kievan Rus' church law and the relationship between church and prince over the course of centuries.

== Copies ==
The original text of the Statute has not survived. The Statute has been preserved in more than 200 copies from the 13th to 19th century, grouped into seven redactions. These copies are a part of various Kievan Rus' collections of laws, including the Kormchaia. The oldest surviving copy of the Statute is contained in the Synodic Kormchaia of 1282 (found in Veliky Novgorod).

== Collection of Church Statutes and Charters ==
Some copies of the statute are often a part of the Collection of Church Statutes and Charters, including church statutes of Prince Vladimir and Prince Yaroslav, the Rule on Church People and the Rule of 165 Saint Fathers. The Collection concludes with Confirmative Charter of 1402 by Vasily Dmitrievich, Grand Prince of Moscow, and Cyprian, Metropolitan of Moscow, mentioning about Vladimir's Statute (the Charter confirmed rights and privileges, given to church by princes Vladimir and Yaroslav, and metropolitans). Thus the Statute of Vladimir could be applied up to the 15th century in Grand Duchy of Moscow and it could be later.

== See also ==
- Kievan Rus' law
- Church Statute of Prince Yaroslav
- Kormchaia
- Merilo Pravednoye
- Rus'–Byzantine Treaties
- Russkaya Pravda
- Sudebnik
- Sudebnik of 1550
- Stoglav
- Sobornoye Ulozheniye

== Some editions ==
- English translation by Daniel H. Kaiser: Synod Copy of Church Statute of Prince Vladimir. Source: The Laws of Rus' - Tenth to Fifteenth Centuries, tr., ed. by Daniel H. Kaiser (Salt Lake City: Charles Schlacks Publisher, 1992), 42-44.
- Memorials of Rus' Law / ed. by Serafim Yushkov. Issue 1: Memorials of Law of Kievan State of the 10th-12th centuries / Aleksandr Zimin. - Moscow: Gosyurizdat (State Juridical Publisher), 1952. - 287 p. (Russian: Памятники русского права / Под ред. С.В. Юшкова. – М.: Госюриздат, 1952. – Вып. I: Памятники права Киевского государства X–XII вв. / Сост. А.А. Зимин. – 287 с.).
- Old Rus' Princely Statutes of the 11-15th centuries / Yaroslav Schapov. - Moscow: Nauka, 1976. - 239 p. (Russian: Древнерусские княжеские уставы XI–XV вв. / Изд. подготовил Я.Н. Щапов. – М.: Наука, 1976. – 239 с.).
- Church Statute of Saint Vladimir (Extensive Redaction) // Mrochek-Drozdovskiy, Pyotr. The History of Rus' Law. Appendix 1. - Moscow, 1892. (Russian: Церковный устав св. Владимира (пространная редакция) // Мрочек-Дроздовский П. Н. История русского права. Приложение 1. - М., 1892).
- Some copies of Church Statute of Prince Vladimir. Source: Makariy (Bulgakov), metropolitan of Moscow and Kolomna. The History of Russian Church. - Moscow, 1995. - Vol. 2. Russian: Макарий (Булгаков), митрополит Московский и Коломенский. История Русской Церкви. - М., 1995 - Кн. 2).

== Some literature ==
- Dimnik, Martin (January 2004). "The Title "Grand Prince" in Kievan Rus'". Mediaeval Studies. 66: 253–312. doi:10.1484/J.MS.2.306512.
- Karamzin, Nikolay. The History of Russian State. - Moscow: Nauka, 1989. - Vol. 1. (Russian: Карамзин Н. М. История государства Российского. - М.: Наука, 1989. - Т. 1).
- Golubinsky, Yevgeny. The History of Russian Church / 2nd edition. - Moscow, 1901. - Vol. 1, part 1. (Russian: Голубинский E.E. История русской церкви / изд. 2-е. - М., 1901. - Т. I. Ч. 1).
- Suvorov, Nikolay. Traces of West Catholic Church Law in Memorials of Old Rus' Law. - Yaroslavl, 1888. (Russian: Суворов Н. Следы западно-католического церковного права в памятниках древнего русского права. - Ярославль, 1888).
- Pavlov, Altksey. Imaginary Traces of Historical Influence in Most Ancient Memorials of South Slavic and Russian Church Law. - Moscow, 1892. (Russian: Павлов А.С. Мнимые следы исторического влияния в древнейших памятниках юго-славянского и русского церковного права. - М., 1892).
- Suvorov, Nikolay. On the West Influence on Old Rus' Law. Yaroslavl, 1893. (Russian: Суворов Н. К вопросу о западном влиянии на древнерусское право. - Ярославль, 1893).
- Yushkov, Serafim (1925). "Study on the History of Rus' Law. Statute of Prince Vladimir". Historical and Legal Research (1). Novouzensk: 151. (Russian: Юшков С.В. Исследование по истории русского права. Устав князя Владимира / Историко-юридическое исследование. – Новоузенск, 1925. – Вып. 1. – 151 с.).
- Yushkov, Serafim. Course of the History of State and Law of USSR. - Moscow: Yurizdat (Juridical Publisher), 1949. - Vol. 1: Social and Political System and Law of Kievan State. - 542 p. (Russian: Юшков С.В. Курс истории государства и права СССР. – М.: Юриздат, 1949. – Т. I: Общественно-политический строй и право Киевского государства. – 542 с.).
- Tsypin, Vladislav, protoiereus. Church Law. - Moscow, 1996. (Russian: Цыпин В. А., протоиерей. Церковное право. - М., 1996).
