= Pravosudiye Mitropolichye =

А се есть правосудие митрополичие (Lo, this is the Metropolitan's Just Judgment)
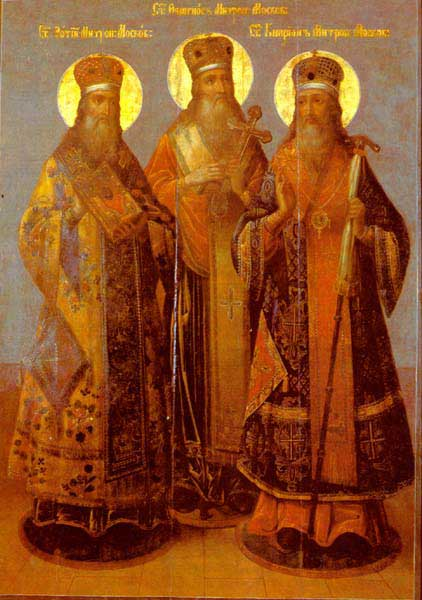
- St. Photius, Theognostus and Cyprian
- Created: 13th - the beginning of the 16th centuries.

Pravosudiye Mitropolichye (Russian: Правосудие митрополичье, IPA: [prəvɐˈsudʲɪjə mʲɪtrəpɐˈlʲitɕjə]), lit. Metropolitan's Justice) is a source of Old Russian law. It reflects the influence of the secular norms on Old Russian church law.

== Text ==
There is one copy in church collection of the writings and homilies Flower Garden (Russian: Цветник). This collection also includes extracts from the Short Chronicler and Kiev Pechersk Patericon, Story about Abdication Books in edition the end of the 15th century, the canonical texts mainly from Novgorod monuments and other materials. It includes special redaction of Church Statute of Prince Yaroslav. According to Vladimir Avtokratov, processing of this redaction is similar to processing of Pravosudiye, therefore compiler of Pravosudiye could be the author of Flower Garden. The name of the monument ("Lo, this is the Metropolitan's Just Judgment") is a postscript at the bottom of the leaf.

== Date ==
Pravosudiye was dated 13—14th centuries by Serafim Yushkov, 13th century by Boris Grekov. Mikhail Tikhomirov noted the similarity of the terminology of Pravosudiye and Moscow monuments, like Sudebniks, and believed that Pravosudiye could not be composed before the 14th century. Lev Cherepnin connected Pravosudiye with Cyprian, Metropolitan of Kiev and all Rus' and some documents of the end of the 14th century. Vladimir Avtokratov gave a late date: between 1497 (the publication of Sudebnik of Ivan III) and paleographic date of available copy of Pravosudiye, that is the beginning of the 16th century.

== Sources ==
According to Vladimir Avtokratov, sources of Pravosudiye Mitropolichye were Russkaya Pravda in Extensive edition, Church Statute of Prince Yaroslav, Zakon Sudnyi Liudem, Old Russian law of 15—16th centuries, including Novgorod law (reflected in monuments such as Dvina Statutory Charter of 1397—1398, Beloozero Statutory Charter of 1488, Novgorod Judicial Charter, Novgorod Treaties with Princes) and possibly Sudebnik of 1497. Parts of the text almost always is marked by cinnabar initials, that meant different sections, taken from different sources. In the central part of the text (articles 13—21), one can see the influence of the structure and content of Sudebnik of 1497.

== Content ==
According to Mikhail Tikhomirov, Pravosudiye Mitropolichye was not related to church courts. It was an original work written by "some not a very literate monk".

Vladimir Avtokratov supposed that Pravosudiye could be created by Novgorod clergy. If one use the late date, the purpose of creating Pravosudiye could be an attempt to replace the main clauses of the Sudebnik of 1497 with obsolete Novgorod legal norms. According to Boris Grekov (who, however, assumed the early date of Pravosudiye), this Sudebnik became unacceptable "for the adherents of the old order", that is, adherents of Novgorod law as opposed to Moscow one. However, the compiler also introduced a number of clauses related to the strengthening of Grand Prince of Moscow. A certain number of Pravosudiye norms of both the all-Russian and local Novgorod law were intentionally archaized. The other norms are outdated in comparison with the judicial practice of the end of the 15th century. This can be explained by typical for this time heightened interest in the texts of Novgorod olden time, as well as interest in codification of law because of the emergence of a unified Russian code of laws, Sudebnik of 1497.

The title of Pravosudiye does not correspond to its content: there is not anything about Metropolitan Bishop and his court in the articles of the document. According to Vladimir Avtokratov, the title could be drawn up to more authority for mainly obsolete legal norms.

== See also ==
- Old Russian Law
- Church Statute of Prince Vladimir
- Church Statute of Prince Yaroslav
- Kormchaia
- Rus'–Byzantine Treaties
- Russkaya Pravda
- Sudebnik of 1497
- Sudebnik of 1550
- Stoglav
- Sobornoye Ulozheniye
