= Kievan Rus' law =

Legal system in Kievan Rus'

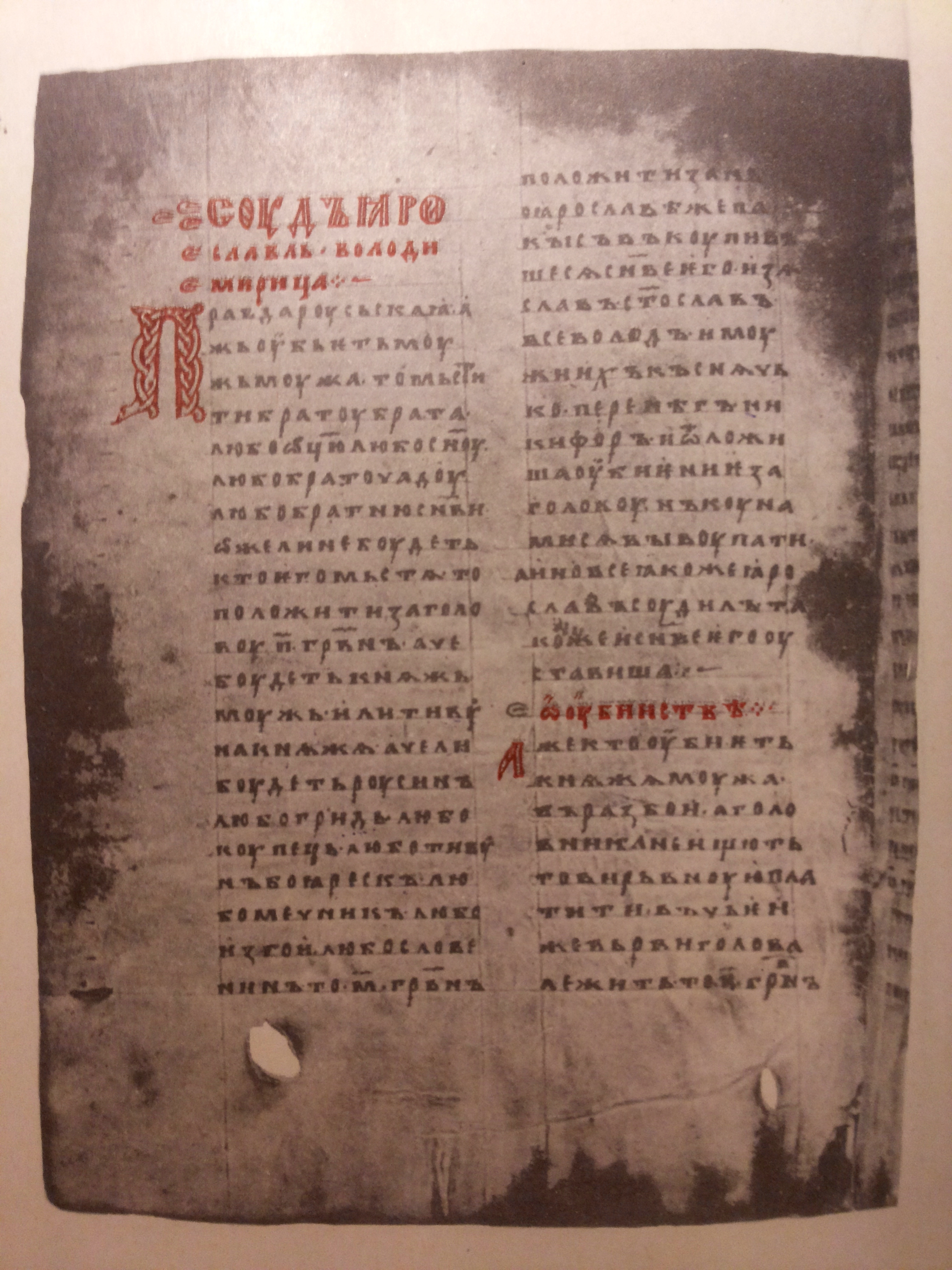
First page of the oldest surviving copy of Russkaya Pravda (Vast edition) from Synodic Kormchaia of 1282 (Novgorod)

Kievan Rus' law or law of Kievan Rus', also known as old Russian law or early Russian law, was a legal system in Kievan Rus' (since the 9th century), in later Rus' principalities, and in the Grand Duchy of Lithuania from the 13th century. Its main sources were early Slavic customary law and Zakon Russkiy (Law of Rus'), which was partly recorded in Rus'–Byzantine Treaties. A number of articles have similarities with the Germanic (barbarian) laws, for example, the "Salic law" – a collection of legislative acts of Francia, the oldest text of which dates back to the beginning of the 6th century. The main written sources were Russkaya Pravda ("Rus' Justice") (since the 11th century) and Statutes of Lithuania (since the 16th century).

== History ==
=== Ryad ===
According to Old Rus' chronicles, in 862, Slavs and Finns invited Varangians under the leadership of prince Rurik to rule in their land:

They said to themselves, "Let us seek a prince who may rule over us and judge us according to the Law." They accordingly went overseas to the Varangian Russes: these particular Varangians were known as Russes, just as some are called Swedes, and others Normans, English, and Gotlanders, for they were thus named. The Chuds, the Slavs, the Krivichians, and the Ves' then said to the people of Rus', "Our land is great and rich, but there is no order in it. Come to rule and reign over us."

— The Laurentian Text of Primary Chronicle.

Early Rus' state settled on the oral treaty, or "ryad" (Old Rus': рядъ) between the prince (knyaz) with his armed force (druzhina) on the one hand, and tribal "nobility" and formally all people on the other hand. The prince and his druzhina defended people, decide lawsuits, provided trade and built towns. And people paid tribute and took part in irregular military. During the ensuing centuries the ryad was playing an important role in Old Rus' princedoms: the prince and his administration (druzhina) found their relationship with people ("all land", "all townsmen" in Old Rus' chronicles) on the treaty. A breach of the treaty could result in exile of the prince (Izyaslav Yaroslavich and Vsevolod Yaroslavich) or even in murder of the prince (Igor Rurikovich and Igor Olgovich).

=== Written secular law ===
One of the result of Rus'–Byzantine Wars was conclusion of treaties with the Byzantine Empire in the 10th century, where, apart from Byzantine legal rules, also Zakon Russkiy (Law of Rus') – rules of Old Rus' oral customary law reflected.

Yaroslav's Pravda of the beginning of the 11th century was the first written law code in Kievan Rus'. This short code regulated the relationship between the princely druzhina ("Rus' people") and the people ("Slovenins") concerning criminal law. After Yaroslav's death, his sons Izyaslav, Vsevolod, Svyatoslav and their druzhina got together and promulgated a code concerning the violation of property rights in princely lands (Pravda of Yaroslav's sons) in the middle of the 11th century. Yaroslav's Pravda and Pravda of Yaroslav's sons became a basis for the Short edition of Russkaya Pravda.

In the period of Vladimir Monomakh's reign at the beginning of the 12th century, the Vast edition of Russkaya Pravda was given, which contained rules of criminal, procedural and civil law, including trade, family law and rules of the bond of obligation.

Later written secular law also included statutory charters, trade treaties, statutes of Grand Duchy of Lithuania, major codes of Muscovy – Sudebniks (see below), and other texts.

=== Byzantine law and church law ===
Translations of Byzantine legal codes, including Nomocanon, were widely spread in Kievan Rus' (see: Kormchaia, Merilo Pravednoye), but it wasn't widely applied in secular or church legal practice, restricted mainly in canon law. The Church in Kievan Rus' did not have wide influence and depended on the power of the state. Thus, church law mainly dealt with family law and sanctions against moral violation.

See also: church statutes of prince Vladimir and prince Yaroslav.

== Main sources ==
Main historical sources of Kievan Rus' law:

Oral sources

- Customary law: Zakon Russkiy (Law of Rus') in Rus'–Byzantine Treaties.

Written sources

Foreign sources

- Byzantine law, including Nomocanon, see Kormchaia
- Zakon Sudnyi Liudem

Native sources

It was in part a record of oral law and revision of foreign sources:

- Rus'–Byzantine Treaties
- Russkaya Pravda
- Church Statute of Prince Vladimir
- Church Statute of Prince Yaroslav
- Local church statutes
- Statutory Charters
- Smolensk Trade Treaty of 1229
- Novgorod's Treaties
- Pravosudiye Mitropolichye
- Novgorod Judicial Charter of the 15th century
- Pskov Judicial Charter of 1467
- Sudebnik of 1497
- Statutes of Lithuania
- Sudebnik of 1550
- Stoglav of 1551
- Sudebnik of 1589
- Sobornoye Ulozheniye of 1607
- Sobornoye Ulozheniye of 1649

Some collections of law

- Kormchaia
- Merilo Pravednoye
- Collections in supplement of Rus' chronicle

== In the Grand Duchy of Lithuania ==
Kievan Rus' law continued to develop in the Grand Duchy of Lithuania. The Kievan Rus' law of the Principality of Lithuania, or Lithuanian-Rus' law, was closely connected with the preceding Kievan Rus' law, as evidenced by the special closeness of these legal systems.

=== Sources of law ===
In the Grand Duchy of Lithuania, Rus' customary law, the norms of Russkaya Pravda, international treaties and Rus' church law were applied. From the end of the 14th century, monarchs (including the Grand Dukes of Lithuania) issued privileges – special charters, private laws aimed at ensuring the rights of individuals or social groups. There were different land-wide privileges, which operated on the territory of the entire state, regional, given to the inhabitants of any one land (principality, voivodeship, district), volost, city and personal (personal). In 1468, King Casimir IV published the Statut, which is the first attempt to codify the norms of the Rus'-Lithuanian criminal and criminal procedure law.

In the first quarter of the 16th century, large-scale work was carried out to systematize the law of the Grand Duchy of Lithuania. In 1529, a set of laws was published in the Ruthenian language – the Statute of the Grand Duchy of Lithuania (First Statute). The statute contained over 230 articles (articles), systematized in 13 sections. They reflected the norms of state, civil, land, criminal and procedural law. The main sources of the Statute of 1529 were local customary law, charters, the Sudebnik of 1468 and Russkaya Pravda. In 1566, the Second Statute (the second edition of the Statute) was published, consisting of 14 sections and 367 articles and fixing the socio-economic and political changes in the state. In 1588, the Third Statute (the third edition of the Statute) was published, which was in force on the territory of Belarus and Lithuania until 1840.

=== Branches of law ===
==== Civil law ====
Ownership. In the Grand Duchy of Lithuania, the legal capacity of the poor landless service gentry was limited. The petty gentry, who served with the pan, could not leave the service without the consent of the master and did not have the opportunity to dispose of the well-earned estate. Dependent peasants did not have the right to acquire land by right of ownership, they could not freely dispose of their real estate. The most limited were the rights of involuntary servants, who could not receive property even by will. The land holdings of the feudal lords were of three types: fatherlands or grandfathers – estates inherited from a father or grandfather; estates bought by the feudal lord himself; estates served, granted for temporary use.

Obligation law. The law established the form and procedure for making transactions, the statute of limitations, the sequence of penalties, etc. Thus, the contract for the sale of estates had to be made in writing in the presence of witnesses and registered in court. When concluding a loan agreement in the amount of more than 10 kops of groszes (A kop was equal to 60 grosz; a grosz is a small piece of silver) the creditor was obliged to obtain a written obligation from the debtor. As security for the loan agreement, the debtor could transfer property to the creditor as a pledge (screen saver). The termination of an obligation occurred in the event of its fulfillment, the expiration of the limitation period, the death of the obligated person, if it was impossible to fulfill it. Limitation periods were provided (with some exceptions): for the recovery of real estate – 10 years, movable – three years.

Inheritance law. According to the law, the heirs of the first stage were the children of the testators and their offspring, born in a legal marriage and not deprived of the right to inherit. The heirs of the second stage are the brothers and sisters of the testator. In the presence of brothers, the daughters of the testators did not inherit the immovable estates of their father. They received one-fourth of the value of the rest of the property, regardless of the number of brothers and sisters. The mother's estate was inherited by them in equal shares with the brothers. After the death of her husband, the wife received no more than one-third of the estate for life, and the husband's children or brothers were the heirs. The dowry of the wife in the event of her death and in the absence of children was returned to her relatives. By will, movable property and estates purchased by the testator himself could be transferred to outsiders. Fathers were to be transferred to heirs according to the law. Dependent people could bequeath to strangers only one third of their movable property. They were obliged to leave two thirds to the children. In the absence of children, these two-thirds were at the disposal of the master. According to the Statute of 1588, the wife could inherit her husband's property, the parents of the testator were included in the number of heirs of the third stage, and other relatives were included in the fourth stage.

Marriage and family law. Along with written law, the norms of customary law were widely used, which for a long time were preserved by the common population. Only a marriage concluded in compliance with church rites was officially recognized. Those who entered into marriage had to reach the age of majority, not be in another marriage and in close relationship. The husband was the head of the family and representative of its interests. If the husband lived in his wife's house (came to "primas"), the wife managed the household, while the husband's rights were limited. Children were to obey the will of their parents. The amount of the dowry was determined by customary law and by agreement of the parties. In the event of the death of the bride's parents, her brothers provided her with a dowry. In accordance with the teachings of the church (both Catholic and Orthodox), divorce was not allowed. However, according to legal custom, a marriage could be dissolved at the request of one or both spouses by a spiritual or secular court. In the event of the insolvency of the debtor – an ordinary person – the court could decide on the transfer to the creditor as a pledge of his children or wife.

==== Criminal law ====
Crime in written monuments of law was understood differently. In one case, it was considered as a violation of the rule of law: "exit" from the law is a socially dangerous act. In another case – as causing harm to the victim: "Shkoda" (damage to property), "falsehood", "hustle". As a violation of the law, the violation of both the law and the norms of customary law was considered.

For intentional crimes, the perpetrator was fully responsible. Intentional murder, in contrast to the Kievan Rus' period (when the punishment was limited to vira (Weregild) and golovshchina), was punishable by death; “golovshchina” and other expenses associated with causing material damage were collected from the criminal's property. In case of negligent murder, the perpetrator was released from punishment, but was obliged to pay golovschin to the relatives of the murdered. The court had to take into account the age of the offender. Minors did not bear criminal punishment (according to the Statute of 1566 – under 14 years old, from 1588 – under 16 years old). In the 16th century, simple and complex complicity in a crime was already distinguished. In the first case, when all accomplices were co-perpetrators of the crime, they were all subjected to the same punishment. With complex complicity, criminals were divided into perpetrators, accomplices, instigators and could be punished in different ways. Punishment was also determined by the class affiliation of the offender and the victim. A criminal act committed by a gentry was punished more easily than the same crime of an ordinary person. So, if a gentry inflicted wounds on another gentry, he was punished according to the talion principle. If a gentry inflicted wounds on a common person, the punishment was limited to a fine. If a simple person wounded a gentry, then he was subjected to the death penalty.

Punishment was seen as retribution for a crime and as a deterrent. The purpose of punishment was also to compensate for the harm caused in the form of various monetary penalties, fines and confiscations. Innovations in comparison with the ancient Russian period were the legalized death penalty, corporal punishment and imprisonment. The death penalty was provided for the commission of a state crime, murder, theft and a number of other acts. It was carried out in the form of hanging, burning, drowning and cutting off the head. Corporal punishment in relation to ordinary people included beating with a whip or with rods. Mutilation, such as cutting off a hand, ears, tongue, cutting nostrils, was also practiced. Imprisonment was also used – for a period of six weeks to one year and six weeks. As an additional measure of punishment against the nobility, deprivation of honor and rights could be applied.

Property punishments were widespread. Like the Russkaya Pravda, Lithuanian legislation provided for a fine for some crimes – "guilt", as well as compensation for damage to the victims or relatives of the murdered – golovshchina. “Guilt” was exacted in favor of the treasury or the bodies and officials themselves who administer justice. The size of the golovshchina depended on the class and position of the murdered. For example, according to the Statute of 1529, for the murder of a hard-working peasant, he was 10 kops of groszes, "an involuntary couple" – 5 kops of groszes, a gentry – 100 kops of groszes.

==== Procedural law ====
There was still no clear distinction between civil and criminal proceedings in the Grand Duchy of Lithuania. The process was accusatory in nature: the victim or his representative were obliged to collect evidence themselves and present it to the court. It was only in 1566 that a rule was established according to which a state investigation was introduced for the most serious crimes. From this period, the criminal process began to acquire an inquisitorial character. Reconciliation of the parties was allowed both in civil and criminal cases. The participation of a lawyer was envisaged.

Much attention was paid to the evidence, subdivided into sufficient (perfect) and insufficient (imperfect). The first included: recognition of the party, written acts, red-handed detention, testimony of a certain number of witnesses, provided by law. Ordinary people could be subjected to torture. In the absence of a sufficient number of witnesses and other full evidence, an oath could be applied. The court ruled orally. Then it was recorded in court books.

The party that was not satisfied with the decision of the court of first instance had to declare this to the court immediately. Otherwise, they were deprived of the right to file a complaint with the court of second instance. Presentation of new evidence to the court of second instance was not allowed. The weakest link in procedural law was the execution of court decisions, since the feudal lords often ignored court decisions.

== In Poland ==
Kievan Rus' law continued to operate in the lands annexed to the Polish crown in the 14th century, although the institutions of Polish law were gradually introduced. Private law was in force for a longer time in relation to the Rus' population, while public Rus' law was completely eliminated with the introduction of the Polish system of courts in Galicia in 1506.

Rus' law was distributed among the rural population within the framework of self-governing communities that continued the tradition of the Kievan Rus' Verv. Villages with Rus' law enjoyed broad self-government, they chose their chiefs: tiuns, starets and even priests, who accepted guarantees for their members. Through the community, its members performed their duties to the state authorities. There were separate industrial courts. However, during this period, the old community (Verv) was split into smaller units (Hearth tax) and, under the pressure of the gentry's possessions, lost self-government. In the 15th-16th centuries, a mass transfer of villages with Rus' law to German Law was made. Polish law became widespread. However, some norms of Rus' law were preserved in the form of customary law.

== Notes ==
=== Some editions of sources ===
- English translations of the Laws of Rus': Source: The Laws of Rus' – Tenth to Fifteenth Centuries, tr., ed. Daniel H. Kaiser (Salt Lake City: Charles Schlacks Publisher, 1992).
- Memorials of Russian Law. Issue 1–7. – Moscow, 1952–. (Russian: Памятники русского права. – М., 1952–. – Вып. 1–7.).
- Russian Legislation of 10th–20th centuries / ed. by Oleg Chistyakov. Moscow: Yuridichtskaya Literatura ("Juridical Literature"), 1984–. – Vol. 1–4. (Russian: Российское законодательство X–XX веков: в 9 т. / Под общ. ред. О.И. Чистякова. – М.: Юрид. лит., 1984–. – Том 1–4).
- Main edition of Russkaya Pravda: Pravda Russkaya / ed. by Boris Grekov. – Moscow; Leningrad: publisher of the Academy of Sciences of the USSR. – Vol. 1: Texts. – 1940. Vol. 2: Commentaries. – 1947. Vol. 3: Facsimile of the texts. – 1963. (Russian: Правда Русская / Под общ. ред. акад. Б.Д. Грекова. – М.; Л.: Изд-во АН СССР. – Т. I: Тексты. – 1940; Т. II: Комментарии. – 1947; Т. III: Факсимильное воспроизведение текстов. – 1963).
- Old Russian Princely Statutes of the 11–15th centuries / Yaroslav Schapov. – Moscow: Nauka, 1976. – 239 p. (Russian: Древнерусские княжеские уставы XI–XV вв. / Изд. подготовил Я.Н. Щапов. – М.: Наука, 1976. – 239 с.).
- (in Russian) Tikhomirov, Mikhail, A study of Russkaya Pravda.

== English references ==
- Oswald P. Backus III. Legal Analysis and the History of Early Russian Law. Published online by Cambridge University Press: 27 January 2017.
- Vernadsky, George. Medieval Russian Laws. – NY: Columbia University Press, 1947. – 106 p.
- Kaiser, Daniel H. The growth of the law in Medieval Russia. – Princeton: Princeton University Press, 1980. – 308 p.
- Feldbrugge, Ferdinand Joseph Maria. Law in Medieval Russia. – Leiden– Boston, 2009.
- Ferdinand J.M. Feldbrugge. A History of Russian Law. Series: Law in Eastern Europe. Vol. 66. Brill, 2018. ISBN 978-90-04-35214-8 ("The beginnings of Russian law are documented by the Russo-Byzantine treaties of the 10th century and the oldest Russian law, the Russkaia Pravda. The tempestuous developments of the following centuries (the incessant wars among the princes, the Mongol invasion, the rise of the Novgorod republic) all left their marks on the legal system until the princes of Muscovy succeeded in reuniting the country. This resulted in the creation of major legislative monuments, such as the Codes of Ivan the Great of 1497 and of Ivan the Terrible of 1550. After the Time of Troubles the Council Code of the second Romanov Tsar, Aleksei, of 1649 became the starting point for the comprehensive Russian codification of the 19th century").
- Padokh, Yaroslav. Ruskaia Pravda. // Encyclopedia of Ukraine. Vol. 4. 1993.
- Magocsi, Paul R. (2010). A History of Ukraine: The Land and Its Peoples. Toronto: University of Toronto Press. p. 896. ISBN 978-1-4426-1021-7.
