= Church Statute of Prince Yaroslav =

А се оуставъ Ярославль соуды с(вя)т(ите)л(ь)скыа
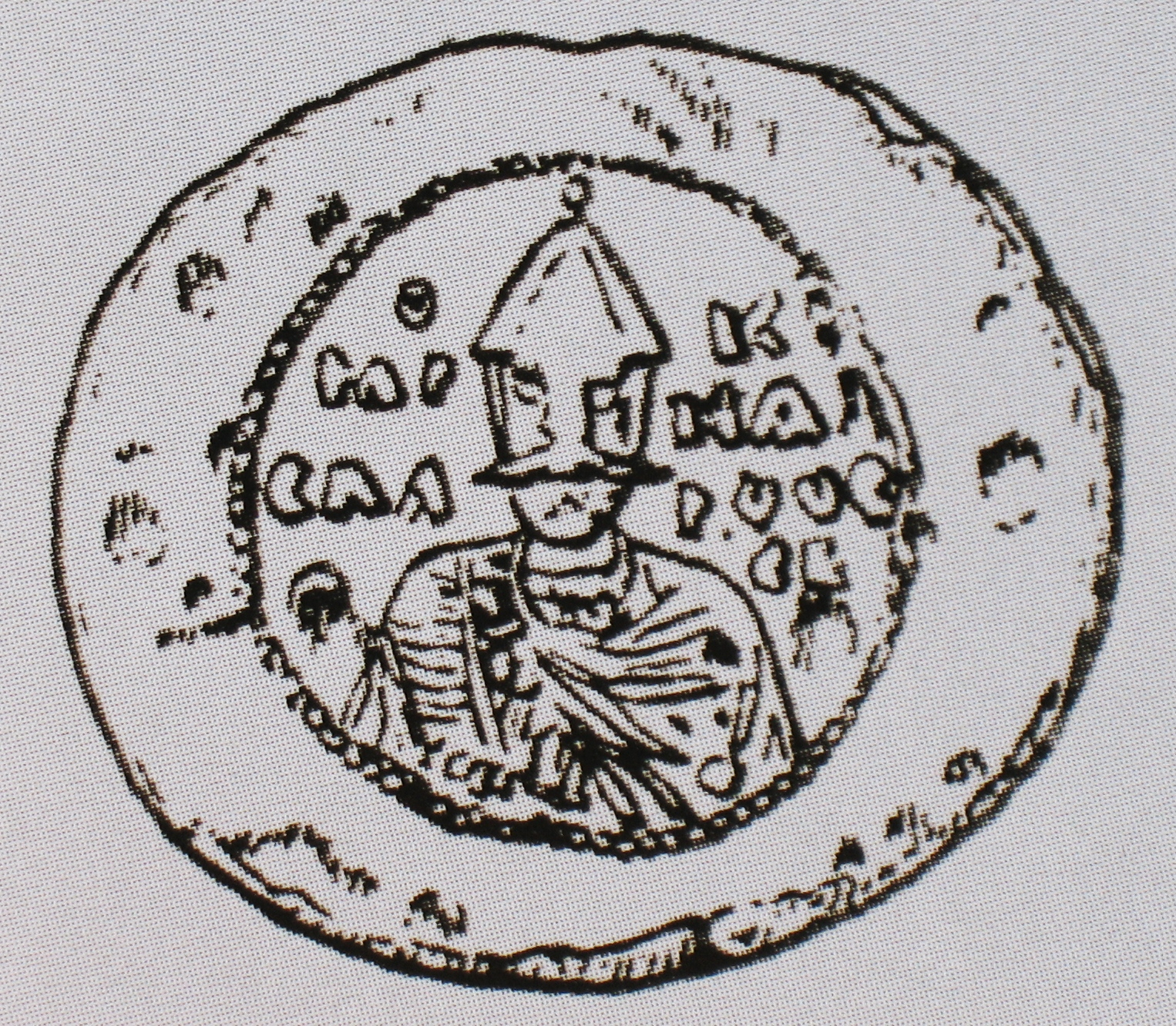
- Official stamp of Prince Yaroslav Vladimirovich, founded in Novgorod in 1994
- Created: from the 11th-12th centuries.
- Author(s): prince`s administration and churchmen.
- Purpose: guidance for the church court.

The Church Statute of Prince Yaroslav (Note: Old East Slavic: А се оуставъ Ярославль соуды с(вя)т(ите)л(ь)скыа, romanized: A se oustavʺ Jaroslavlʹ soudy s(vja)t(ite)l(ʹ)skya "This is the Statute of Iaroslav [on] Hierarchs' Courts". Russian: Церковный устав Ярослава, romanized: Cerkovnyj ustav Jaroslava "Jaroslav's Church Statute". Ukrainian: Церковний устав Ярослава, romanized: Cerkovnyj ustav Jaroslava "Jaroslav's Church Statute".) is a source of church law in Kievan Rus', defined legal authority of church by the prince (knyaz), his administration and churchmen. Yaroslav's Statute was a short legal code, regulated relationship between the church and the state, including demarcation of jurisdiction between church and princely courts, index of persons within the church jurisdiction, rules of family law (family law belonged to church jurisdiction) and sanctions against moral violation. The statute was written at the 11th–12th century and remade during 13th–16th centuries, in Old Church Slavonic and Old East Slavic. It was one of the first church sources of Kievan Rus' law. Church Statute of Prince Vladimir and other Rus' princely statutes served to closely purposes. But church jurisdiction was expanded in comparison with Vladimir's Statute. A part of the lawsuits in the Yaroslav's Statute was referred to the church jurisdiction, and a part - to joint jurisdiction of the church and the prince. One of the sources of the statute was Byzantine law, including Nomocanon.

The statute was written on behalf of Kievan prince (and the prince of all Rus') "Yaroslav, son of Volodimir, following [the example of] my father's gift, have consulted with Ilarion, Metropolitan of Kiev and All Rus' ".

== History ==
Konstantin Nevolin, Altksey Pavlov, Vasily Klyuchevsky, Aleksandr Lototsky, V. Chernov, Mikhail Tikhomirov, Serafim Yushkov, A. Kartashov and Yaroslav Schapov attributed the emergence of the statute to Pre-Mongol Period (before the first half of the 13th century). Nikolay Karamzin, Yevgeny Golubinsky, Nikolay Suvorov and Aleksandr Zimin - to the 13th-14th centuries.

Serafim Yushkov considered that only introduction and conclusion of the statute belonged to Yaroslav Vladimirovich. The rest of the text (code of law) was written at the middle of the 12th century.

== Meaning ==
The statute particularly concerns rules of family law: adultery, illegal marriage, divorce and others, and also sanctions against moral violation. Some offences, suppressed in Byzantium by ecclesiastical sanctions (penance, etc.), were suppressed by secular criminal punishment (monetary penalties, etc.) in the Kievan Rus'. The statute also reflected medieval right-privilege: punishment was differentiated by estate (social group) of victim. According to Vasily Klyuchevsky the church court, described in the statute, deepened the concept of crime, expanded the concept of sanity and established sanction for prevention of violation.

== Copies ==
The original has not survived. The statute is survived in more than 90 copies (since 15th century), united in six redactions. These copies are a part of various Rus' collections of laws, including Kormchiye.

== Collection of Church Statutes and Charters ==
Copies of Short Redaction of the statute are often a part of the Collection of Church Statutes and Charters, including church statutes of prince Vladimir and prince Yaroslav, the Rule on Church People and the Rule of 165 Saint Fathers. The Collection concludes with Confirmative Charter of 1402 by Vasily Dmitrievich, Grand Prince of Moscow, and Cyprian, Metropolitan of Moscow, mentioning about the Yaroslav's Statute (the Charter confirmed rights and privileges, given to church by princes Vladimir and Yaroslav, and metropolitans). Thus the Statute of Yaroslav could be applied up to the 15th century in Grand Duchy of Moscow and it could be later. Existence of Ruthenian redaction of 1499 (Scroll of Yaroslav, Ruthenian: Свиток Ярославль) means that the statute could be also applied in Grand Duchy of Lithuania.

== See also ==
- Kievan Rus' law
- Church Statute of Prince Vladimir
- Kormchaia
- Merilo Pravednoye
- Rus'–Byzantine Treaties
- Russkaya Pravda
- Sudebnik
- Sudebnik of 1550
- Stoglav
- Sobornoye Ulozheniye

== Some editions ==
- English translation by Daniel H. Kaiser: Archeographic Copy of Church Statute of Prince Yaroslav. Source: The Laws of Rus' - Tenth to Fifteenth Centuries, tr., ed. Daniel H. Kaiser (Salt Lake City: Charles Schlacks Publisher, 1992), 45–50.
- Memorials of Russian Law / ed. by Serafim Yushkov. Issue 1: Memorials of Law of Kievan State of the 10th-12th centuries / Aleksandr Zimin. - Moscow: Gosyurizdat (State Juridical Publisher), 1952. - 287 p. (Russian: Памятники русского права / Под ред. С.В. Юшкова. – М.: Госюриздат, 1952. – Вып. I: Памятники права Киевского государства X–XII вв. / Сост. А.А. Зимин. – 287 с.).
- Old Russian Princely Statutes of the 11-15th centuries / Yaroslav Schapov. - Moscow: Nauka, 1976. - 239 p. (Russian: Древнерусские княжеские уставы XI–XV вв. / Изд. подготовил Я.Н. Щапов. – М.: Наука, 1976. – 239 с.).

== Some literature ==
- Klyuchevsky, Vasily. The Course of Russian History. Lecture 15. (Russian: Ключевский В. О. Курс русской истории. Лекция XV).
- Golubinsky, Yevgeny. The History of Russian Church / 2nd edition. - Moscow, 1901. - Vol. 1, part 1. (Russian: Голубинский E.E. История русской церкви / изд. 2-е. - М., 1901. - Т. I. Ч. 1).
- Suvorov, Nikolay. Traces of West Catholic Church Law in Memorials of Old Russian Law. - Yaroslavl, 1888. (Russian: Суворов Н. Следы западно-католического церковного права в памятниках древнего русского права. - Ярославль, 1888).
- Yushkov, Serafim. Course of the History of State and Law of USSR. - Moscow: Yurizdat (Juridical Publisher), 1949. - Vol. 1: Social and Political System and Law of Kievan State. - 542 p. (Russian: Юшков С.В. Курс истории государства и права СССР. – М.: Юриздат, 1949. – Т. I: Общественно-политический строй и право Киевского государства. – 542 с.).
- Tsypin, Vladislav, protoiereus. Church Law. - Moscow, 1996. (Russian: Цыпин В. А., протоиерей. Церковное право. - М., 1996).
