= Abraham of Rostov =

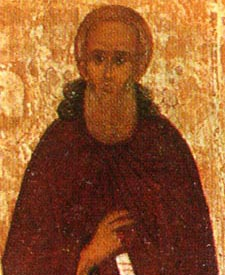
- Icon of Saint Abraham of Rostov

Monk
- Born: Galich, Russia
- Died: 1077; Rostov, Yaroslavl Oblast, Russia
- Venerated in: Eastern Orthodox Church; Roman Catholic Church
- Canonized: 1549
- Feast: October 29 (November 11 in Gregorian calendar)

Abraham of Rostov (?–1077), Archimandrite of Rostov, in the world Abercius, was born in the tenth century in Chuhloma, which is in Kostroma region near Galich, Russia.

== Life ==
Born Abercius, he was very ill as a child. He converted to Christianity in his youth after, according to tradition, being cured of illness through prayer. He decided to become a monk at Valaam and with the new name Abramius (Abraham) settled at Rostov on the shore of Lake Nero.

Not far from his hut was a temple where the local tribes worshiped the stone idol of Veles, a source of superstitious fright in the whole neighborhood. His legend recounts a miraculous vision of John the Evangelist, who gave him a staff, crowned with a cross, to destroy the idol. In commemoration of this, at the site of the temple, Abraham erected a monastery in honor of the Theophany. He also built a church dedicated to Saint John the Theologian and preached the Gospel in his area. Convinced by his preaching, many pagans were baptized.

At the petition of the Rostov princes Avraham was ordained to the rank of archimandrite of the monastery of the Theophany.

== Death and veneration ==
Abraham died in old age and was buried in the church of the Theophany by his disciples. His relics were found during the time of Grand Prince Vsevolod Georgievich (1176-1212). According to Golubinsky the general church canonization of Abraham was held already by the time of the Makaryev Sobors of 1547–1549. The divine service devoted to Abraham of Rostov, compiled in the imitation of the like to Sergius of Radonezh, was first mentioned in the manuscript collection of the 15th century.

In 1551 Ivan the Terrible, during his military campaign against Khanate of Kazan, made a pilgrimage to the Abraham Monastery before the battles. He took the staff of the saint and upon the successful defeat of Kazan khans he returned it back and ordered the construction of the stone Cathedral of the Theophany in 1553- 1555.

His feast days are: October 29 (November 11) (new style) - finding relics - in the Synaxis of the Kostroma saints, May 23 - in the Synaxis of Rostov-Yaroslavski Saints and in the Synaxis of the Karelian Saints - May 21 (dates are given according to the Julian calendar).

== Years of life and activity ==
The legend of the saint indicates 1010 as the date of his death, but most historians recognize this date to be wrong. Nikolay Karamzin indicated, that Abraham was acting in Rostov during or after Andrey Bogolyubsky (c. 1111 – 1174). The activity of Abraham in Rostov dates from 1073 to 1077 years according to Vasily Klyuchevsky; Macarius Bulgakov refers it to (?)-1045 years, Andrei Titov - the end of the XI - the beginning of the XII century, Filaret (Gumilevsky) - the beginning of the XII century.

Evgeny Golubinsky was skeptical about the very fact of the existence of Abraham, apparently considering him a single person with Abraham Galitzki and referring his activity to the last quarter of the fourteenth century (according to the legend, the latter lived the same years as Yury Dmitrievich, born in 1374). Arseny Kadlubovsky does not consider Abraham to be the founder of the Theophany Monastery, and also relates his life to the fourteenth century.

== Sources ==
- Brockhaus and Efron Encyclopedic Dictionary
