= Russkaya Pravda =

Legal code of Kievan Rus'

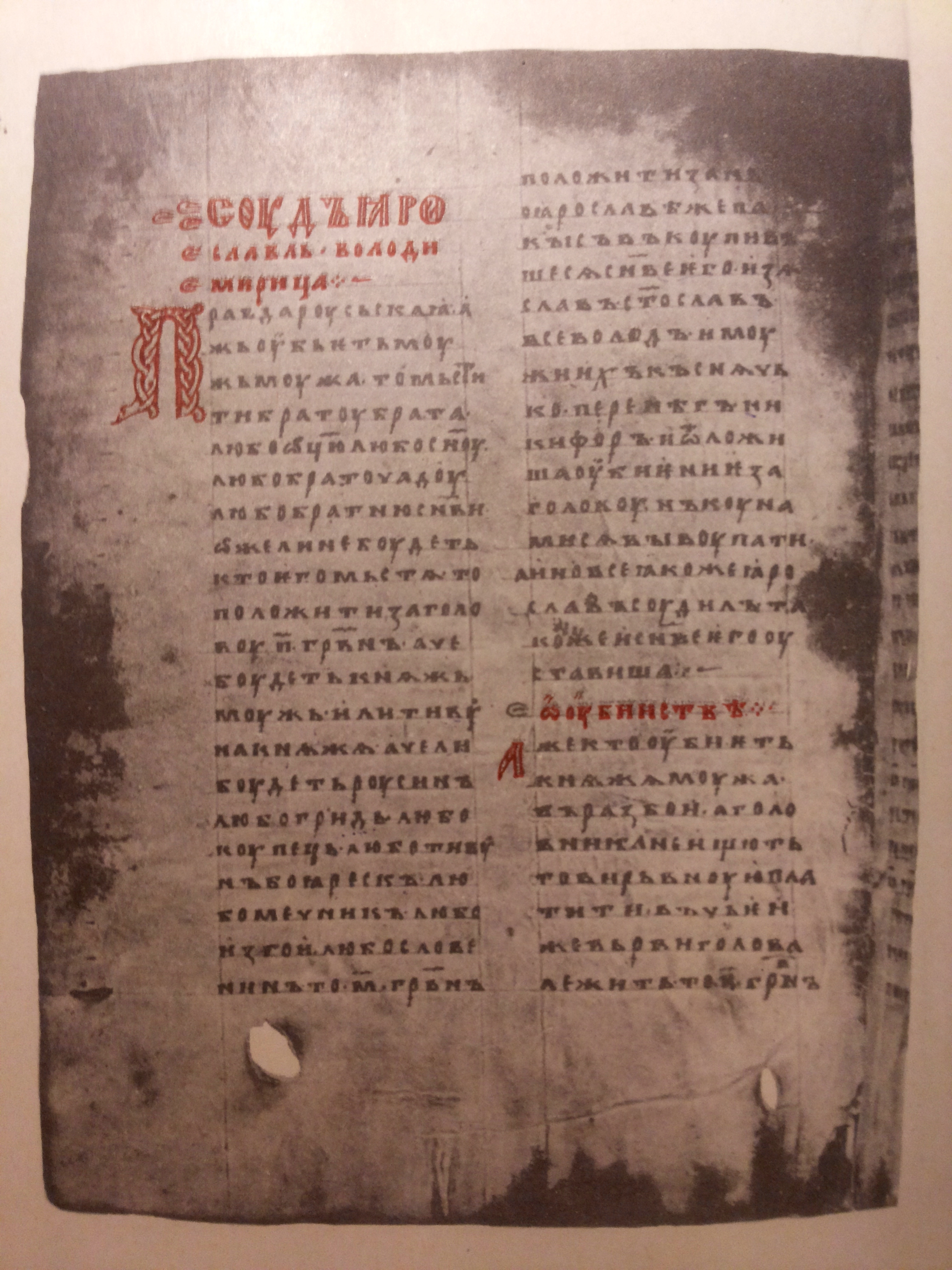
- First page of the oldest surviving copy of the Russkaya Pravda (Extensive Edition), from the Synodic Kormchaia of 1282 (Novgorod)
- Created: Early 11th century
- Author: Prince's administration
- Purpose: Guidance for the princely court

The Russkaya Pravda (sometimes translated as Rus' Justice, Rus' Truth, or Russian Justice) (Note: Old East Slavic: Правда роусьскаꙗ, romanized: Pravda Rusĭskaya (13th century, 1280), Правда Руськая, Pravda Rusǐkaja (second half of the 15th century); Russian: Русская правда, Russkaya Pravda; Ukrainian: Руська Правда, Rus'ka Pravda.) was the legal code of Kievan Rus' and its principalities during the period of feudal fragmentation. It was written at the beginning of the 12th century and remade during many centuries. The basis of the Russkaya Pravda, the Pravda of Yaroslav, was written at the beginning of the 11th century. The Russkaya Pravda was a main source of the law of Kievan Rus'.

In spite of great influence of Byzantine legislation on the contemporary world, and in spite of great cultural and commercial ties between Byzantium and Kievan Rus', the Russkaya Pravda bore no similarity whatsoever to the law of the Byzantine Empire. The absence of capital and corporal punishment rather reflects Norse jurisprudence.

== Editions ==
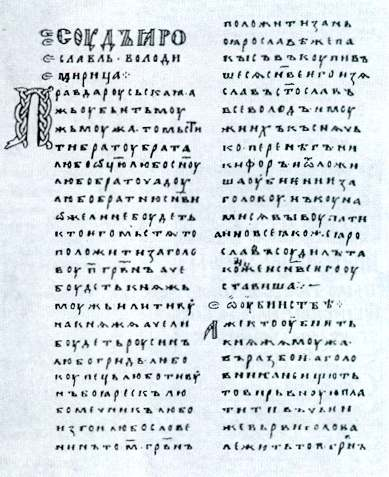
Copy of the "Extensive edition". Beginning manuscript: "СѸДЪ ꙖРОславль ‧ володимирица⁘⁓ Правда рѹсьскаꙗ :" (Sudŭ Jaroslavlĭ Volodimirica. Pravda Rusĭskaja.)

Three recensions of the Russkaya Pravda are known: the Short Edition (Kratkaya Pravda), the Extensive Edition (Prostrannaya Pravda), and the Abridged Edition (Sokrashchyonnaya Pravda). The shortest version numbers around 850 words, while the longest version is around four times as long. The abridged version is known from two 17th-century copies. 13 copies of the Kratkaya Pravda are extant, while an additional four are known to have existed but are now lost. 11 of the extant copies were made in the 18th and 19th century, while the other two are dated to the mid-15th century. Around 100 copies of the Prostrannaya Pravda are extant. Around three-quarters are found in kormchie books, while the remainder were found in various other collections that were also monastic in origin. These include for example the Merilo Pravednoye.

Modern scholarship of the Russkaya Pravda began in 1738 when the historian Vasily Tatischev rediscovered the code in the text of one of the manuscripts of the Novgorod chronicles, where it was included under the year 1016. He offered his annotated text and brought it to the attention of the Russian Academy of Sciences, but it was not published until 1786. Around the same time, August Ludwig von Schlözer published the text of the Russkaya Pravda using a different manuscript. Both works were concerned with the Kratkaya Pravda. The text of the Prostrannaya Pravda was published by V. Krestinin in 1788. The first study on the Russkaya Pravda, aside from Tatischev's comments, was an academic address called Discours sur l’origine et les changements des loix russiennes delivered by F. Strube de Piermont in 1756. The results of two centuries of scholarship were collected in a three-volume edition published by the Soviet Academy of Sciences under the editorship of Boris Grekov.

== Genesis and evolution ==
The legal regulations of the Russkaya Pravda reflected the evolution of the social relations in Kievan Rus' during the 11th–13th centuries. Common law, knyaz legislation, and legal proceedings represented the basis of the Russkaya Pravda. The presumable similarity with Scandinavian law raises questions, as the earliest written law books appeared after the Christianization of Scandinavia. Several studies on the connections with Germanic law have also been conducted, but attention has mostly been focused on the earliest law, the Leges Barbarorum. The similarities are not very specific, and there is a gap of about five centuries. The 9th-century Lex Saxonum has also been compared, in which the first dozen or so articles are close to the first ten articles of the Kratkaya Pravda.

The Short Edition of the Russkaya Pravda contains two chronological components, called by researchers the Pravda Yaroslava ("The Pravda of Yaroslav"), otherwise known as the Drevneyshaya Pravda ("Oldest Justice") of Yaroslav the Wise, and the Pravda Yaroslavichey ("The Pravda of Yaroslav's Sons"). Due to the Short Edition not being a homogenous legal document, this has given rise to a theory that it is the amalgamation of two independent versions of the Russkaya Pravda. However, the Pravda Yaroslavichey appears to be an addition to the Pravda of Yaroslav, as it regulates questions not covered by the latter, and so modern scholars tend to accept the refutation of this theory. In regards to prior legislation, scholars often draw attention to treaties with the Byzantine Empire in 911 and 941, both of which mention the zakon russkii. (Note: Also translated as the "Russian custom".) As a result, the most probable source for the Pravda of Yaroslav would be customary law.

The two basic copies of the Short Edition have come from the text of the Novgorod chronicle. The chronicle says that Yaroslav, in accordance with the prevailing practice among the Rurikids, was appointed as the prince of Novgorod by his father Vladimir. One of his duties was the yearly tribute to Kiev, but in 1013 or 1014, Yaroslav, with the support of Novgorod, ceased this payment. His father began to gather an army as a result to enforce his claim, while Yaroslav brought in Varangians to strengthen his own army. These Varangians caused unrest in Novgorod, leading to many of them being killed during an uprising. Yaroslav had some of the prominent Novgorodians killed as a result, but when he heard of the news of his father's death, he made peace with Novgorod. He then marched against his half-brother Sviatopolk, and after emerging victorious, he dismissed the Novgorodian troops and gave them a law code (pravda). Yaroslav wrote a statute (ustav), saying: "Live according to this charter (gramota), as I have written it for you, and observe it". Although many scholars have given their opinion regarding the origins of the Short Edition, the majority opinion is to give credence to the general narrative given in the chronicle, in that Yaroslav did write a law that was connected to Novgorod's support in his war against his half-brother. It is generally agreed that the second part, the Pravda Yaroslavichey, was not included in this law.

Subsequent development and improvement of the Russkaya Pravda took place in times of Yaroslav's sons and his grandson Vladimir Monomakh. The Pravda Yaroslavichey is known as such because it starts with the following: "The law established for the Russian land, when Iziaslav, Vsevolod, Sviatoslav, Kosniachko Pereneg, Mikyfor the Kievan, and Chudin Mikula met together". There remains uncertainty about the precise date of the Pravda Yaroslavichey, with 1072 being given as the mostly likely date. New provisions are believed to have been added to the Russkaya Pravda after the revolts in Kiev, Novgorod, and Rostov-Suzdal province in 1068–1071. The first part of the Expanded Edition, the Pravda of Yaroslav, was likely a heavily amended version of the Short Edition enacted sometime in the late 11th or early 12th century. The second part, which represented the law code created by Vladimir Monomakh, was enacted shortly after the uprising of 1113.

In the arising Russian state centered on Moscow, the Russkaya Pravda was replaced by the Sudebnik of 1497 under Ivan III, which in turn was succeeded by the Sudebnik of 1550 under his grandson Ivan IV. The Sudebnik put an end to the legal fragmentation of Russia. It replaced other law codes in certain regions, including the Pskov Judicial Charter and Novgorod Judicial Charter. The Pskov Judicial Charter in particular was the most significant piece of legislation between the Russkaya Pravda and the Sudebnik of 1497, which was the first milestone of a newly unified Russian state.

== Institutions ==
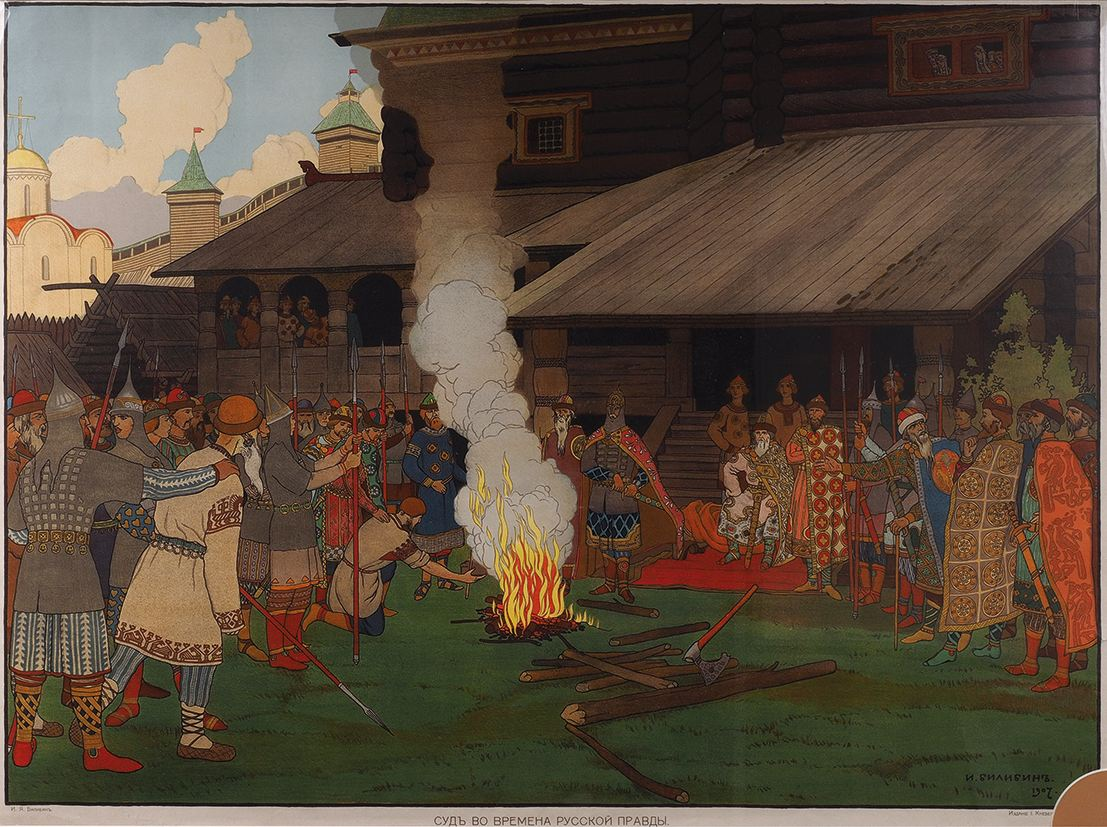
The Judicial System in the Time of Russkaya Pravda by Ivan Bilibin (1909)

The Pravda Yaroslavichey increased responsibility of a given community for killing soldiers of a knyaz, tiuns ("tiun", a privileged servant of knyazs or boyars), starostas ("starosta", a representative from the low-ranking administration of a knyaz), otroks ("otrok", a low-ranking soldier in the army of a knyaz) and other servants on their own territory. The Pravda Yaroslavichey provided severe punishment for arson, deliberate cattle mutilation, and collective encroachment on rich people's property. After the 1113 Riot in Kiev, an exorbitant interest law was introduced that limited financial operations of moneylenders.

The Pravda stabilized the system of feudal relations and social inequality. During the 11th–13th centuries, it made new laws for the smerds ("smerd" – a feudal-dependent peasant), zakups ("zakup" - a feudal-dependent peasant, who could become free after paying off his "zakup", a feudal loan), kholops ("kholop" – a feudal-dependent peasant, who could be killed or sold like a slave) etc. The Vast Edition of Pravda contains special regulations regarding the status of zakups and kholops. It also reflects the role of the court of a knyaz, by increasing and giving various forms of punishment and penalties. It instituted fines that benefited the knyaz or his administration with diminished compensation to the victims.

In an attempt to abolish the blood feud (that was quite common at that time), the Pravda narrowed its "usage" and limited the number of avengers to the closest relatives of the dead. If there were no avengers on a male victim's side, the killer had to pay a fine (called vyra) in favour of the knyaz and partial compensation to the relatives of the victim (the killer's community had to help him pay his fine). If the victim was a woman, one would pay half of the regular fine (called poluvir'ye, half of vyra). The Pravda also protected the health and honor of the free members of the feudal society and provided financial compensation for mutilation or insult by word or deed. The Pravda had a comprehensive system of punishments and penalties for larceny in a city or countryside, deliberate damage to forests, hunting grounds or lands, trespassing etc. It also regulated debt between individuals and contained articles of liability and hereditary law. The Pravda made use of witnesses, oaths and of the trial by water or iron, a kind of a last-resort test used to prove defendant's innocence or guilt in legal proceedings. The legal process also included testimony witnesses, evidence, collecting or hot pursuit. Investigators had to check for false accusations, as well.

== See also ==
- Byzantine law
- Nomocanon
- Zakon Sudnyi Liudem
- Church Statute of Prince Vladimir
- Church Statute of Prince Yaroslav
- Pravosudiye Mitropolichye
- Statutes of Lithuania
- Stoglav
- Sobornoye Ulozheniye
- Poljica Statute
- Law code of Vinodol

== Sources ==
- "Русская Правда, памятник древнерусского права" . Brockhaus and Efron Encyclopedic Dictionary (in Russian). 1906.
- Feldbrugge, Ferdinand Joseph Maria (2009). Law in Medieval Russia. BRILL. ISBN 978-90-04-16985-2.
- Feldbrugge, Ferdinand J. M. (2 October 2017). A History of Russian Law: From Ancient Times to the Council Code (Ulozhenie) of Tsar Aleksei Mikhailovich of 1649. BRILL. ISBN 978-90-04-35214-8.
