= Symphonia (theology) =

Eastern Orthodox Christian concept

Symphonia (Greek: συμφωνία 'accord') is a normative theory or concept in Eastern Orthodox Christian theological and political thought, especially within the Eastern Roman and Russian Empires, which posits that church and state are to complement each other, exhibiting mutual respect with neither institution presuming to dominate the other.

The theory can be traced back to the policy of Roman Emperor Constantine I (r. 324–337). Emperor Justinian I (r. 527–565) expressed this position when he said: "A distinction is drawn between the imperial authority and the priesthood, the former being concerned with human affairs and the latter with things divine; the two are regarded as closely interdependent, but, at least in theory, neither is subordinated to the other." Such a position is scripturally based as evidenced in several Old Testament texts; the most notable references being that of Melchizedek the priest-king and the brotherly relationship between Aaron, the high priest, and Moses, the leader of Israel from Egypt.

The theory is believed to have been embodied in the Byzantine Empire from the time of Justinian's reign, when ecclesiastical and civil law were indivisible, that is, canon law came to be enforced by the emperor. It was reasserted in the Stoglav, a church code promulgated in the Tsardom of Russia in 1551. In Stanley Harakas' view, "there are almost no existing presuppositions for its implementation as a system of Church–state relations in our times", and "at most, it presents 'an impossible ideal' in the contemporary world, which may illumine some attitudes for Orthodox Christians regarding their views of the well-ordered state as well as the relationship of the Church toward the state."

Symphonia became the subject of political discussion in Russia when it was brought up and dwelt upon by Patriarch Kirill of Moscow in the presence of President Dmitry Medvedev the day following Kirill's accession to the Russian Orthodox patriarchal throne on February 1, 2009.

== See also ==
- Christianity and politics
- Constantinian shift
- History of the Eastern Orthodox Church
- Papal temporal power
- Political theology
- State church of the Roman Empire
- Two kingdoms doctrine
- Doctrine of the two swords
