= Council of Vladimir =

The Council of Vladimir (Russian: Владимирский собор) was a Church council of the Russian Orthodox Church, held at the initiative of Metropolitan Kirill II in the city of Vladimir. Its exact date is disputed, but it is believed to have occurred between 1272 and 1274.

== Background ==
In the wake of the Mongol conquest of Rus’, Kirill was appointed Metropolitan of Kiev. In 1270, he sent a request to the Bulgarian despot Iakob Svetoslav to send books of canon law (Kormchaia kniga) with interpretations. A translation from Greek into Old Church Slavic had been made in 1225 in Serbia, but Kirill called the council to resolve differences in canon law.

== Decisions ==
The council that a new Kormchaia should be compiled.
