= Pskov Judicial Charter =

Legal code of the Pskov Republic

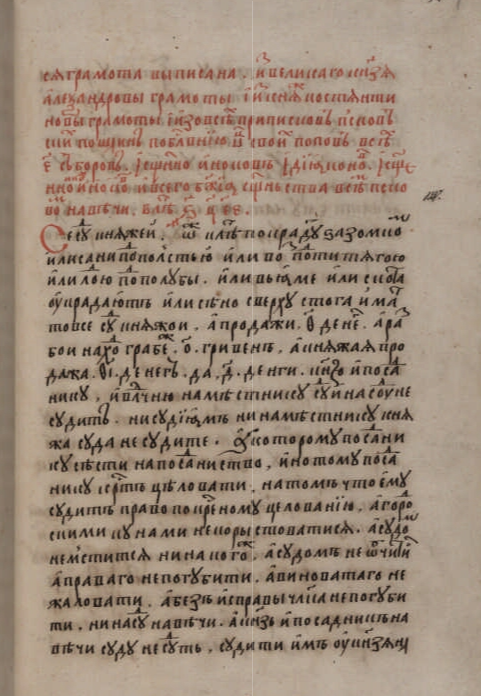
The first page of the Pskov Judicial Charter (Vorontsov Copy)

The Pskov Judicial Charter (Russian: Псковская судная грамота), also known as the Charter of Pskov, was the legal code of the Pskov Republic. It was issued in various redactions between 1397 and 1467.

It, along with the Novgorod Judicial Charter, was an important source for the Sudebnik of 1497 under Ivan III, the first collection of laws of the unified state. It is considered to be a monument of Russian law.

== Description ==
Only one complete copy is known to have survived, while a smaller fragment, known as the Synodal Copy, was found and published by the historian Nikolai Karamzin in 1812. The full text of what is called the Vorontsov Copy was found and published by Nikolai Murzakevich in 1847. The document is divided into 120 articles. A number of authors believe that the available texts were copied from defective copies.

The preamble of the Synodal Copy says:

This charter has been copied [vypisana] from the charter of the grand prince Aleksandr and the charter of prince Konstantin and all the records of Pskov's ancient customs, with the blessing of its fathers, the priests of the five cathedral churches and the priest-monks and the deacons and the priests and all of God’s clergy by the whole of Pskov at the veche in the year 6905.

Although the preamble refers to the year 6905 in the Byzantine calendar (1396/1397), there were only two cathedral districts in Pskov at the time, while the fifth sobor was introduced in 1462 and the sixth in 1471, which suggests an enactment date somewhere between 1462 and 1471. The prevailing view is that the first redaction was finished in 1397 and the final redaction was completed during 1462–1471.

The Charter reflected the most important aspects of socio-economic and political life in Pskov during the 14th and 15th centuries. It protected private property, especially feudal landownership, regulated procedures for official registration of landownership and court examination of land disputes, and defined the status of the so-called izorniki (a category of feudally dependent peasants). Many articles of the Charter were dedicated to trade relations, such as buying and selling, pawning, loans, and the hiring of workforce. The code provided for a death penalty in case of a political crime or regular criminal offense.

== Sources ==
The preamble refers to the chapters of the princes Aleksandr and Konstantin and to ancient Pskovian customs (poshliny), although nothing is known for certain about these. Only one prince by the name of Konstantin is known, a brother of Vasily Dmitriyevich of Moscow, who reigned in Pskov in the early 15th century. The identity of Aleksandr is disputed; the two likely candidates are considered to be Aleksandr Yaroslavich Nevsky (1220–1263) and Aleksandr Mikhailovich of Tver (1301–1339). Although Aleksandr Nevsky never reigned in Pskov, he was considered to be the liberator of Pskov, while Aleksandr Mikhailovich lost the title of grand prince when he became the prince of Pskov. Despite this, Pskov was a borough (prigorod) of Novgorod at the time of Aleksandr Nevsky's reign, and the grand prince of Moscow, Ivan III, refused to confirm the charters presented by the Pskovian ambassadors in 1474 due to them not being issued by the grand princes themselves; therefore, it is unlikely that Ivan would have denied the title to his direct paternal ancestor.

It is likely that the Pskov Judicial Charter was compiled on the basis of earlier statutes, and principal subjects included commercial law, criminal law, debts, evidence, inheritance, the law of procedure, the legal position of peasant classes, as well as the rights of officials. The compiler also had some notion of legal collections such as the Merilo Pravednoye. Several scholars have also noted the similarities between the Charter and the Russkaya Pravda, which is in the terminology and common legal institutions rather than direct borrowings.

Lev Cherepnin says that the Pskov Judicial Charter was edited in Moscow during 1484–1486 as part of the codification programme of Ivan III, and he believes that the surviving copy of the full text is based on this revision. The Charter is considered to be a principal source for the Sudebnik of 1497, which was enacted during the reign of Ivan III, and this may explain the revision of the Charter in Moscow.

== Bibliography ==
- Feldbrugge, Ferdinand J. M. (2 October 2017). A History of Russian Law: From Ancient Times to the Council Code (Ulozhenie) of Tsar Aleksei Mikhailovich of 1649. BRILL. ISBN 978-90-04-35214-8.
- Hellie, Richard (2006). Perrie, Maureen (ed.). The Cambridge History of Russia: Volume 1, From Early Rus' to 1689. Cambridge University Press. pp. 360–386. ISBN 978-0-521-81227-6.
- Kaiser, Daniel H. (1992). The Laws of Rusʹ: Tenth to Fifteenth Centuries. C. Schlacks Jr. ISBN 978-1-884445-04-0.
- Riasanovsky, Nicholas Valentine; Steinberg, Mark D. (2019). A History of Russia. Oxford University Press. ISBN 978-0-19-064558-8.
