= Philaret Gumilevsky =

Russian Orthodox archbishop (1805-1866)

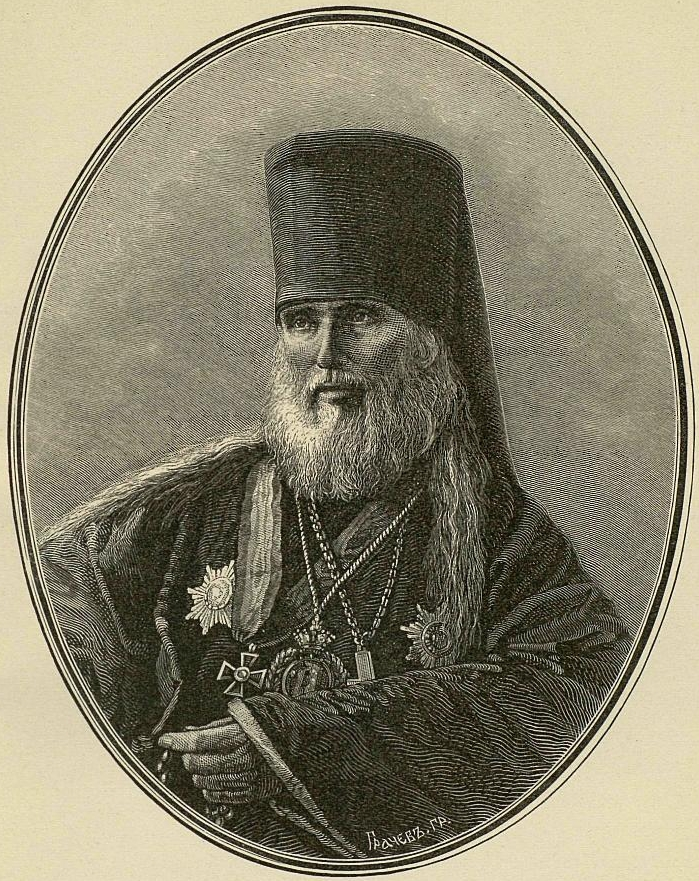
Filaret (Gumilevsky)

Archbishop Philaret (Russian: Архиепископ Филарет, secular name Dmitry Grigorievich Konobeyevsky (Конобе́евский); 1805-1866) was the Russian Orthodox Bishop of Riga (1841–48), Archbishop of Kharkov (1848–59), and Archbishop of Chernigov (1859–66).

The son of a priest from the village of Lesnoye Konobeyevo, Shatsky District, Tambov Governorate, Filaret is best known as a theologian and church historian. At the precocious age of 30 he was appointed Dean of the Moscow Theological Academy based in the Troitse-Sergiyeva Lavra.

During his tenure in Riga (1841-1848) the Governorate of Livonia saw a religious conversion movement, as a result of which more than one hundred thousand Estonian and Latvian peasants converted to Orthodoxy. He also established a school in Riga in February 1846, which grew four years later into a seminary (Latvian: Rīgas Garīgais seminārs).

His magnum opus is The History of the Russian Church (1847–48), the first complete and systematic outline of the evolution of the Russian Orthodox Church. It was seen as a clerical counterpart to Karamzin's great history of the Russian state and went through many reprints. This work was later revised and expanded by the likes of Macarius Bulgakov and Yevgeny Golubinsky.

Filaret Gumilevsky is buried in the Trinity Cathedral, Chernihiv. In 2009, the Ukrainian Orthodox Church (Moscow Patriarchate) recognized him as a saint for local veneration.
