= Novgorod Judicial Charter =

The Novgorod Judicial Charter (Russian: Новгородская судная грамота), also known as the Charter of Novgorod, was the legal code of the Novgorod Republic, inherited from the earlier Russkaya Pravda ("Russian Truth") and issued in 1440, although the current version was supplemented in 1471 under the auspices of Grand Prince Ivan III (r. 1462–1505), and his son, Ivan Ivanovich (1458–1490). The preamble reads:

After reporting to the lords the grand princes, Grand Prince Ivan Vasil'evich of All Russia, and his son Grand Prince Ivan Ivanovich of All Russia, and with the blessing of the archbishop-elect of Novgorod the Great and of Pskov, the priest-monk Feofil, it has been decided by the mayors of Novgorod, and the commanders [tysiatskie] of Novgorod, and the boyars, and the burghers [zhit'i liudi], and the merchants, and the common people [chernye liudi], all five boroughs, and all Lord Novgorod the Great at the assembly [veche] in Iaroslav's Court.

The charter exists in only one copy with the end missing. While it was issued very late in the history of the Novgorod Republic, it probably codified practices that had existed for some time. It allowed for four sets of courts: the ecclesiastical, headed by the archbishop of Novgorod); the mayoral, headed by the posadnik; the princely, headed by the prince or his namestnik (lieutenant); and the tysyatsky's, headed by the tysyatsky, who was originally head of the town militia, although the court probably served as a commercial court.

The various provisions of the charter dealt with administrative matters, the collection of court fees and stipulated that cases had to be completed before a posadnik left office (they were elected annually). It did not deal with particular crimes as such. That was dealt with in the Russkaya Pravda.

The Novgorod Judicial Charter, along with the similar Pskov Judicial Charter, are considered more sophisticated than Muscovite law of the time, and contributing factors in Ivan III's issuance of the Sudebnik of 1497.

== Sources ==
- Feldbrugge, Ferdinand J. M. (20 October 2017). A History of Russian Law: From Ancient Times to the Council Code (Ulozhenie) of Tsar Aleksei Mikhailovich of 1649. BRILL. ISBN 978-90-04-35214-8.
