= Aleksandr Zimin =

Russian medievalist (1920-1980)

Aleksandr Aleksandrovich Zimin (Александр Александрович Зимин; 1920-1980) was one of the most prolific and well-known Soviet medievalists. His area of expertise was late medieval Muscovy.

== Biography ==
Zimin was born in a noble family in Moscow. In the 1950s, Zimin edited the official historical series dedicated to the history of Moscow. However, at least seven of his monographs were not published during his lifetime. His 1964 essay attempted to prove that The Song of Igor's Campaign was fabricated in the 1770s. It met skepticism and hostility from the academic community and was eventually banned from being printed.

Another important work, Warrior at the Crossroads, was not published until the dissolution of the Soviet Union in 1991. It described the Muscovite Civil War of the 1430s as a vital clash between the autocratic, pro-Tatar, Muscovite administration and the protocapitalist forces, clustered around the northern Principality of Galich, with its salt production facilities.

Zimin's mother descended from Field Marshal Kamensky. He was involved in researching her family's history. At the time of Zimin's death in 1980, his unpublished manuscripts reportedly "totaled many thousands of typed pages".
