= Macarius Bulgakov =

Russian bishop (1816–1882)

- Metropolitan and archbishop of Moscow
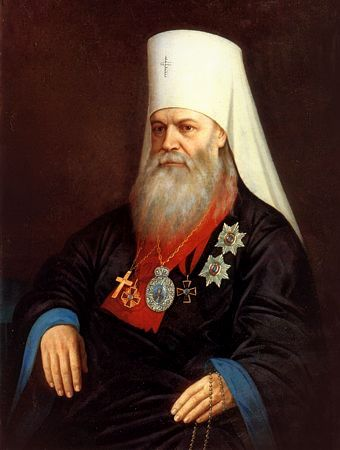
- Portrait, 1880
- Church: Russian Orthodox Church
- See: Moscow
- Installed: 1879
- Term ended: 1882
- Predecessor: Innocent of Alaska
- Successor: Joannicius, Metropolitan of Moscow

Personal details
- Born: 1 October 1816
- Died: 21 June 1882 (aged 65)
- Education: Kiev Theological Academy

Metropolitan Macarius (Russian: Митрополи́т Мака́рий, born Mikhail Petrovich Bulgakov, Russian: Михаи́л Петро́вич Булга́ков; 1 October [O.S. 19 September] 1816–21 June [O.S. 9 June] 1882), was the Metropolitan of Moscow and Kolomna in 1879–82 and member of many learned societies, including the Russian Academy of Sciences.

In 1841, he graduated from the Kiev Theological Academy, of which he served as a dean in 1851–57. His popular student manual, Orthodox Dogmatic Theology, steeped in the Latin methodology, was originally printed in 6 volumes in 1847–53. In 1866 Macarius started the publication of his landmark History of the Russian Church, for which he is best remembered. The 12th volume of his magnum opus, covering the patriarchate of Nikon, was released posthumously.

Macarius has been considered one of the major church historians of the Russian Empire in the 19th century, along with Philaret Gumilevsky, Yevgeny Golubinsky, and Vasily Bolotov.

Of Tatar descent, he was a distant relative of the major Eastern Orthodox theologian Sergei Bulgakov.
