= Rus'–Byzantine Treaty =

Treaties between the Kievan Rus' and the Byzantine Empire:

- Rus'–Byzantine Treaty (907)
- Rus'–Byzantine Treaty (911), supplementary agreement to the one of 907
- Rus'–Byzantine Treaty (945)
- Rus'–Byzantine Treaty (971)
- Rus'–Byzantine Treaty (1045)

== See also ==
- Kievan Rus' law
- Russkaya Pravda
