= Mikhail Tikhomirov =

Soviet historian (1893-1965)

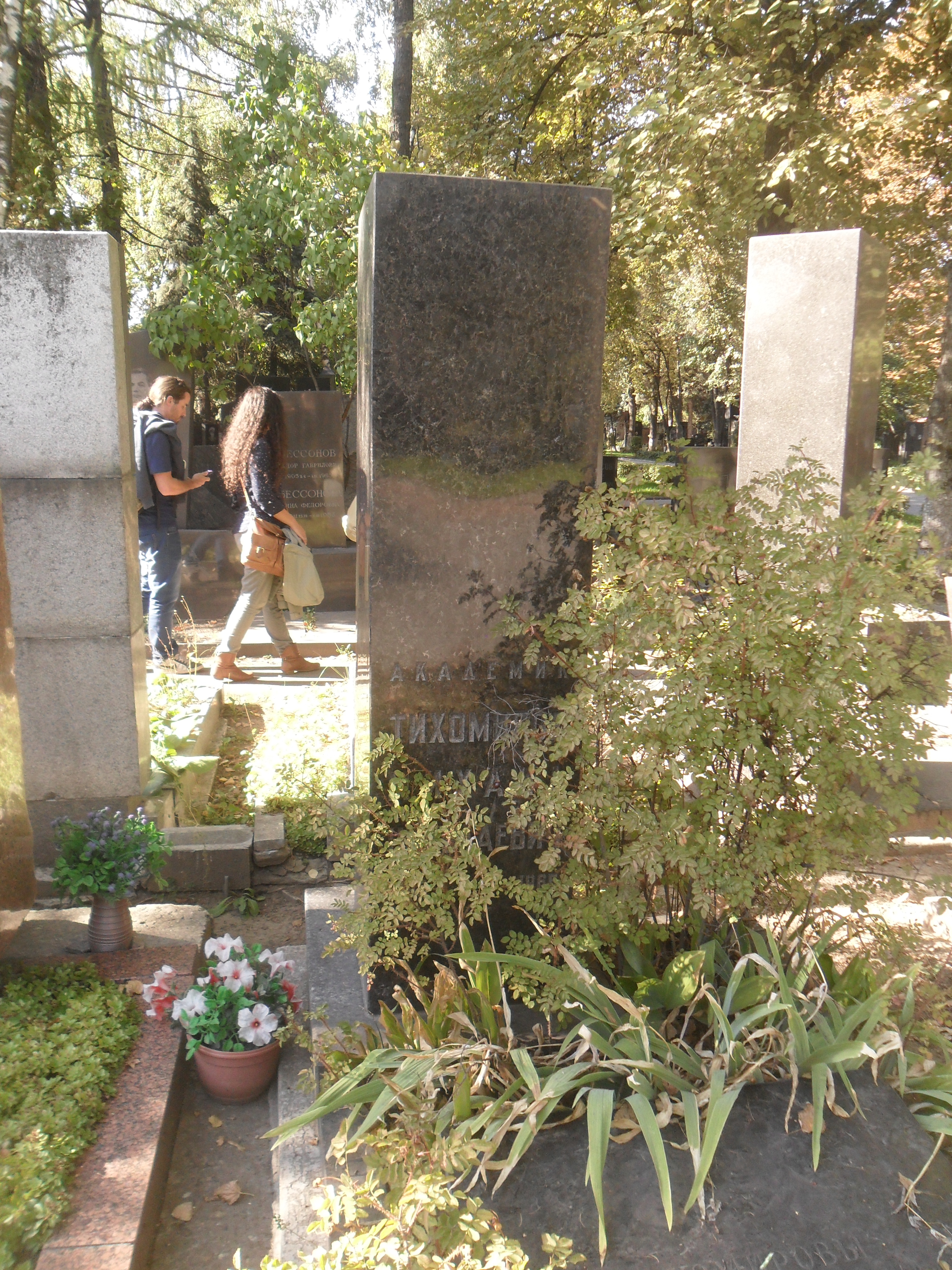

Mikhail Nikolayevich Tikhomirov (Russian: Михаи́л Николáевич Тихоми́ров; 31 May 1893 — 2 September 1965) was a leading Soviet specialist in medieval Russian paleography.

Tikhomirov was born and spent his whole life in Moscow, where he was in charge of the Archaeographic Commission of the Academy of Sciences of the USSR (to which he was elected a corresponding member in 1946 and full member in 1953). He was responsible for the Soviet edition of the Full Collection of Russian Chronicles and edited collections of many other medieval documents, including the Russkaya Pravda and Sobornoye Ulozhenie.

His major works include A Study of Russkaya Pravda (1941), Old Russian Cities (1956, 2nd ed.), Medieval Moscow (1957), Russia in the Sixteenth Century (1962), Russian Culture from the Tenth to the Eighteenth Century (1968), The Russian State from the Fourteenth to the Seventeenth Century (1973), and Ancient Rus (1975).
