= Yevgeny Golubinsky =

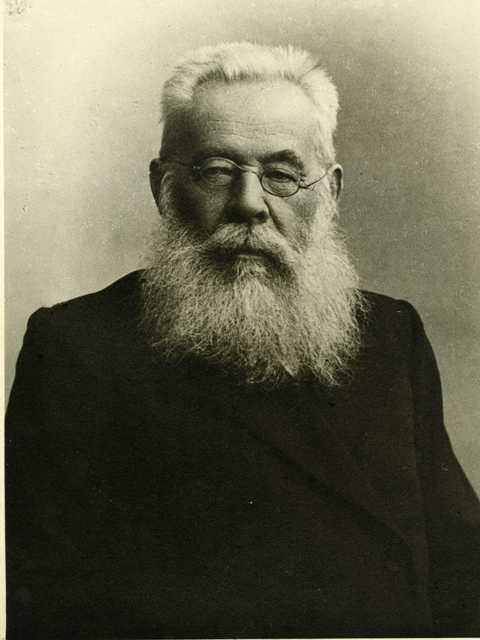
Professor E. E. Golubinsky

Yevgeny Yevsigneyevich Golubinsky (Russian: Евгений Евсигнеевич Голубинский; 28 February 1834 – 7 January 1912) was one of three major church historians of the Russian Empire, along with Macarius Bulgakov and Filaret Gumilevsky. He was considered the foremost authority on the Russian medieval saints.

Golubinsky was the son of an Orthodox priest from the district of Kologriv who gave him the surname of Fyodor Golubinsky, a religious philosopher from Kostroma. He was educated in the church schools of Soligalich and Kostroma before completing his studies at the Moscow Theological Academy. In 1872 and 1873, he travelled to the Holy Land and Mount Athos.

Golubinsky's most highly regarded work examines the canonization practices of the Russian Orthodox Church. In 1881, he was awarded the Uvarov Prize for his outline of the history of the Russian Church.

At the theological academy, Golubinsky repeatedly ran afoul of his conservative minded colleagues such as Konstantin Pobedonostsev, because he employed the innovative method of Positivism: "the objective study of a phenomenon to find a positive solution based on logic as opposed to superstition or some other nonrational approach".

As a result of these conflicts, some of his works have never been published, although he was elected into the Petersburg Academy of Sciences in 1902. He went blind four years later.
