= Merilo Pravednoye =

13th–14th-century Russian legal text

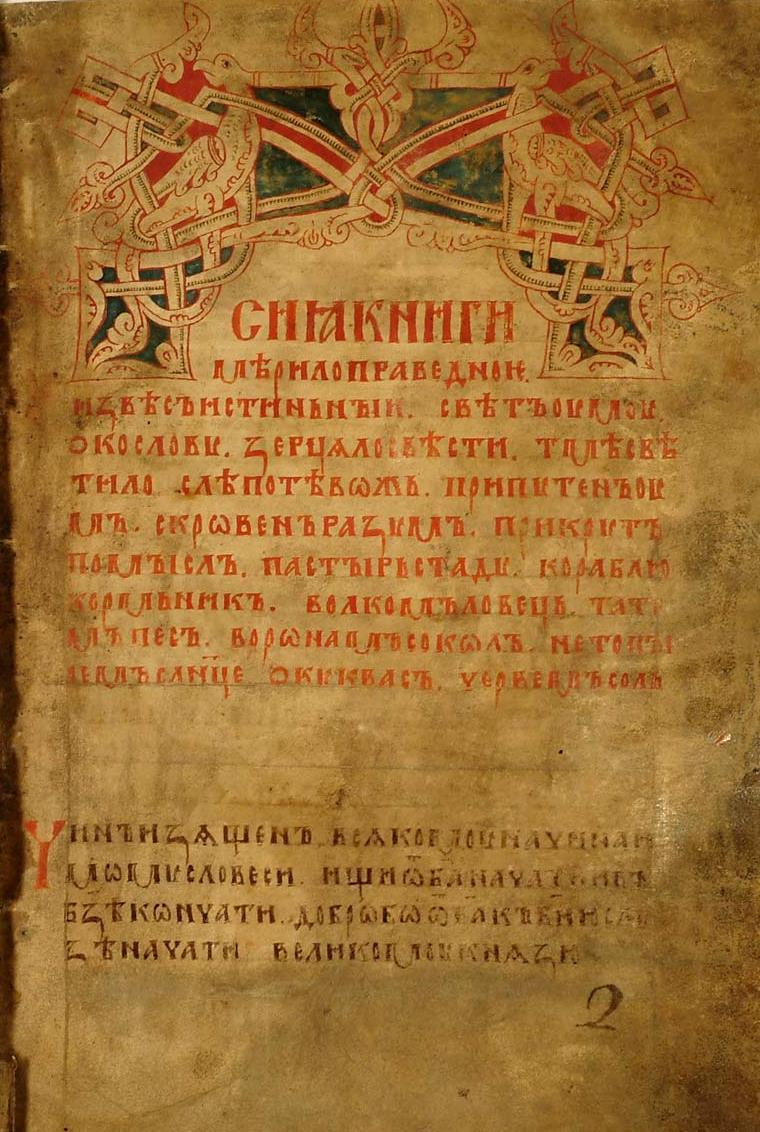
- Page of the oldest surviving Trinity (Troitsky) copy of Merilo Pravednoye, 14th century
- Created: late 13th or early 14th century
- Author(s): churchmen and monks
- Purpose: moral precept; guide book for the court; transmission of several old texts

Full text
- Merilo Pravednoye at Wikisource

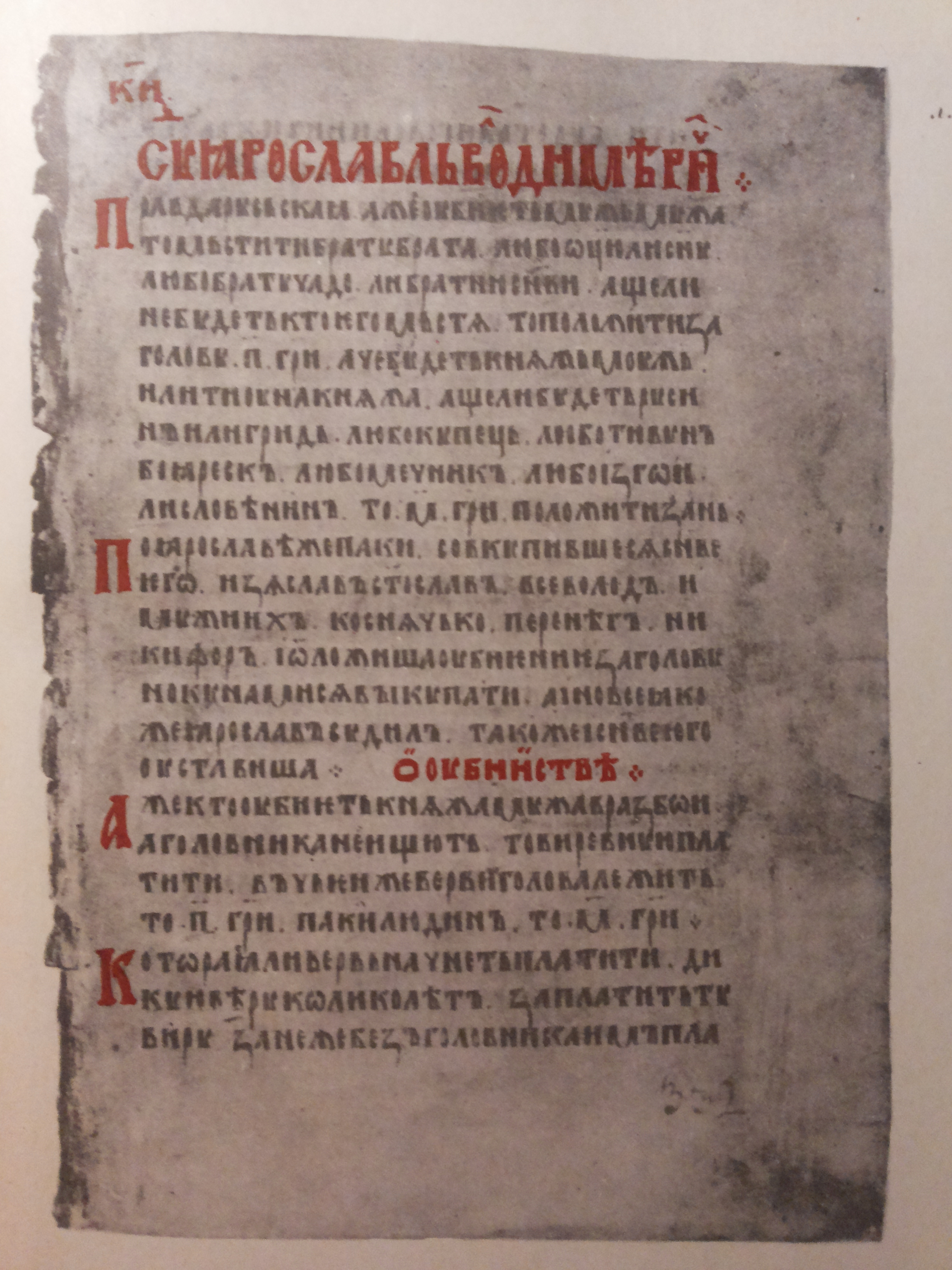
First page of the Russkaya Pravda (expanded edition) from the oldest surviving Trinity copy of the Merilo Pravednoye

The Merilo Pravednoye or Just Measure (lit. 'measure of righteousness'; Russian: Мерило Праведное, Church Slavonic: мѣрило праведноѥ) is a Russian collection of writings from the late 13th or early 14th century, preserved in the copies of the 14th to the 16th centuries. The name was given in modern literature, taken from the first words of this text: "this book is the measure of righteousness, a declaration of truth" (Church Slavonic: сиѩ книги мѣрило праведноѥ. извѣсъ истиньныи..., romanized: siya knigi merilo pravednoye, izves istin`nyi...). The Merilo Pravednoye was written in both Church Slavonic and the Old Russian vernacular.

== Content ==
The Trinity (Troitsky) copy is the oldest surviving copy from the 14th century and is the standard text. The first part consists of 69 sheets which are mainly religious texts of Greek origin, but some are of Russian origin, while the second part consists of 275 sheets which are more legal in nature and are mostly of Byzantine origin.

Materials from the old legal collection from the early 12th century may have been used during the compilation of Merilo Pravednoye. It was to serve both as a book of moral precepts and a legal guide book for judges as well as the transmission of several older texts. The first part contains the words and the lessons (poucheniya) both translated and original, on the just and the unjust courts; the second part (the so-called collection of 30 chapters) consists of translations of Byzantine church and secular laws, borrowed from the Kormchaia Book, and the oldest Slavic and Russian legal texts, the Zakon Sudnyi Liudem, the Church Statute of Vladimir the Great, the Russkaya Pravda, and the "Legal rule on the church people" – Pravilo zakonno o tserkovnykh liudiakh.

A revised version of the Merilo Pravednoye appeared in the 15th century. A number of new texts were added, while some others were removed. The Rozenkampf (Chudov) and Ferapontov groups of the extended version of the Russkaya Pravda are also included.

== See also ==
- Nomocanon
- Kormchaia

== Bibliography ==
- "Мерило Праведное" . Brockhaus and Efron Encyclopedic Dictionary (in Russian). 1906.
- Feldbrugge, Ferdinand Joseph Maria (2009). Law in Medieval Russia. BRILL. ISBN 978-90-04-16985-2.
- Kaiser, Daniel H. (14 July 2014). The Growth of the Law in Medieval Russia. Princeton University Press. ISBN 978-1-4008-5559-9.

== Editions ==
- Мерило Праведное по рукописи XIV века. Издано под наблюдением и со вступительной статьей академика М. Н. Тихомирова. Изд. АН СССР. – М., 1961.

== Literature ==
- Арсений. Описание славянских рукописей библиотеки Свято-Троицкой Сергиевой лавры // Чтения в обществе истории и древостей российских. – М., 1878.
- Бальцежак Е. Е., Николаев Г. А. О языке церковно-деловых текстов древнерусской письменности // Словобразование, Стилистика. Текст. – Казань: Изд-во Казан. ун-та, 1990.
- Бенеманский М. Ὁ Πρόχειρος Νόμος императора Василия Македонянина. Его происхождение, характеритика и значение в церковном праве. Вып. 1. – Сергиев Посад, 1906.
- Бенешевич В. Н. Древнеславянская кормчая. 14 титулов без толкований. Т. 1. Вып. 1-3. – СПб., 1906 -1907.
- Василевский В. Г. Законодательство иконоборцев // Журнал Министерства Народного Просвещения. Октябрь, 1878.
- Востоков А. Х. Описание русских и славянских рукописей Румянцевского музеума. – М., 1841.
- Данилова В. М. Палеографическое и фонетическое описание рукописи «Мерило Праведное» (Троицкое собрание, № 15). Автореф. дисс…канд.филол. наук. – М., 1969.
- Зализняк А. А. "Мерило праведное" XIV века как акцентологический источник. - Мunchen : Sagner, 1990. - 183 с. (Slavistische Beitrage; Bd.266).
- Калачев Н. В. Исследование о Русской Правде. Ч. 1. Предварительные юридические сведения для полного объяснения Русской Правды. – М., 1846.
- Калачев Н. В. Мерило Праведное // Архив историко-юридических сведений, относящихся до России. – СПб., 1876. – Кн. 1.
- Николаев Г. А. Формы именного словообразования в языке Мерила Праведного XIV века. Автореф. дисс…канд.филол. наук. – Казань, 1966.
- Николаев Г. А. Язык церковно-деловых памятников древнерусского извода // Христианизация, дехристианизация и рехристианизация в теории и практике русского языка. Под ред. Ежи Калишана. – Познань, 2001.
- Павлов А. С. Первоначальный славяно-русский Номоканон. – Казань, 1969.
- Павлов А. С. «Книги законныя», содержащие в себе в древнерусском переводе византийские законы земледельческие, уголовные, брачные и судебные. – СПб., 1885.
- Розенкампф Г. А. Обозрение Кормчей книги в историческом виде. – СПб., 1839.
- Сперанский М. Н. Переводные сборники изречений в славяно-русской письменности. – М., 1904.
- Срезневский И. И. Обозрение древних русских списков Кормчей книги. Приложение // Сборник ОРЯС, т. 65, № 2. 1897.
- Тихомиров М. Н. Исследование о Русской Правде. Происхождение текстов. – М.;-Л., 1941.
- Тихомиров М. Н. Закон судный людем краткой редакции в русских рукописях. Вступительная статья к изданию Закона судного людем в краткой редакции. – М., 1961.
- Юшков В. С. К истории древнерусских юридических сборников (XIII в). – Саратов, 1921.
- Николаев, Геннадий. Мерило Праведное. (Заметки о составе памятника) // Православный собеседник № 1 (14) - 2007. Сайт Библиотека Якова Кротова.
