= Zakon Sudnyi Liudem =

Oldest preserved Slavic legal text

Законъ соудьныи людьмъ or Судебник царя Константина
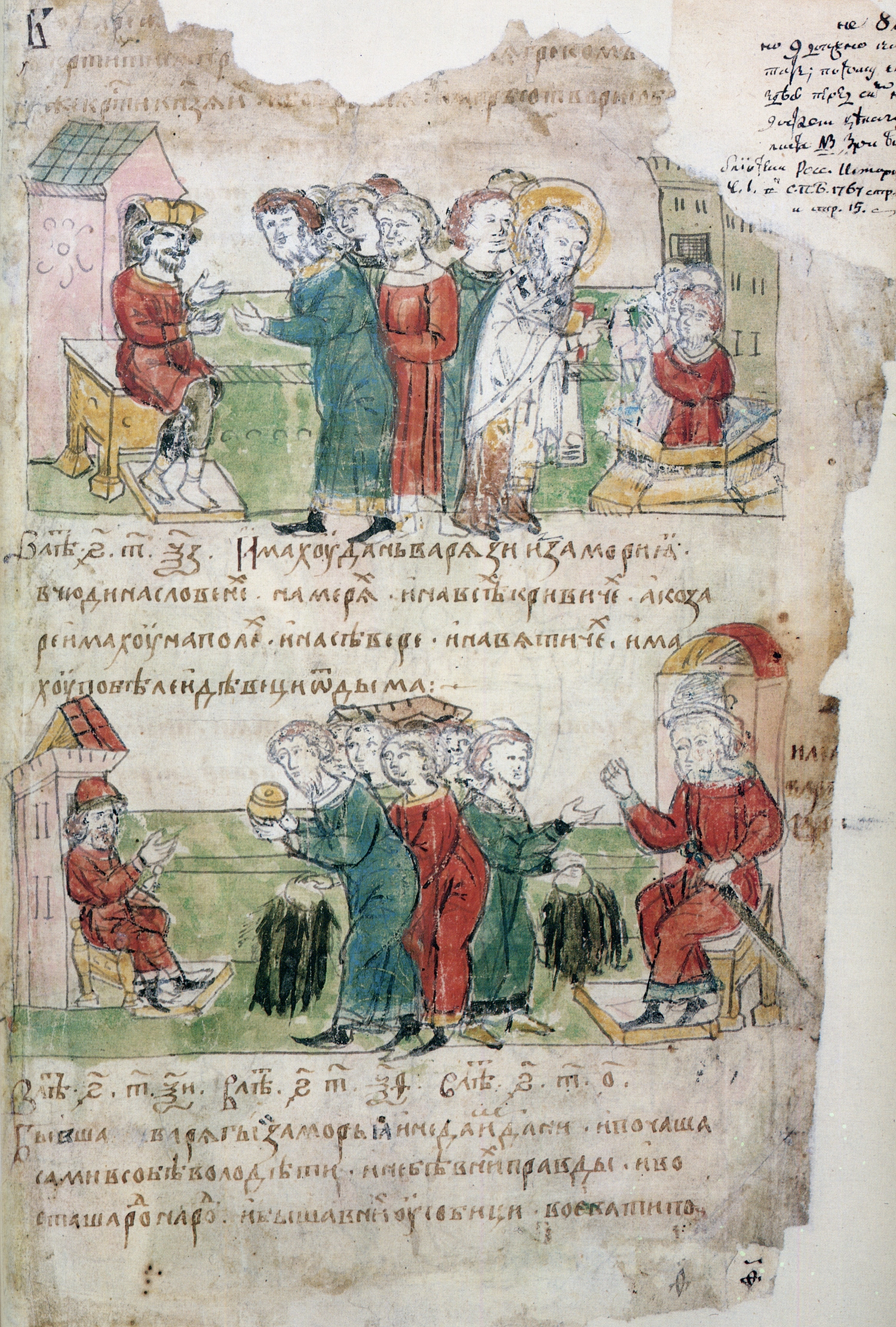
- Bulgarians make a request to Byzantine Emperor Michael to baptize them; christening of Bulgarians. Miniature from Radzivill Chronicle. The text from Radzivill Chronicle: "Bulgarians saw that they cannot resist, and asked to baptize them and fell to the Greeks. The Tsar christened their prince and all the boyars..."
- Created: the end of the 9th century
- Author: unknown (in Bulgaria or Great Moravia)
- Purpose: guide book for the management of the church and for the church court; transmission of several old texts

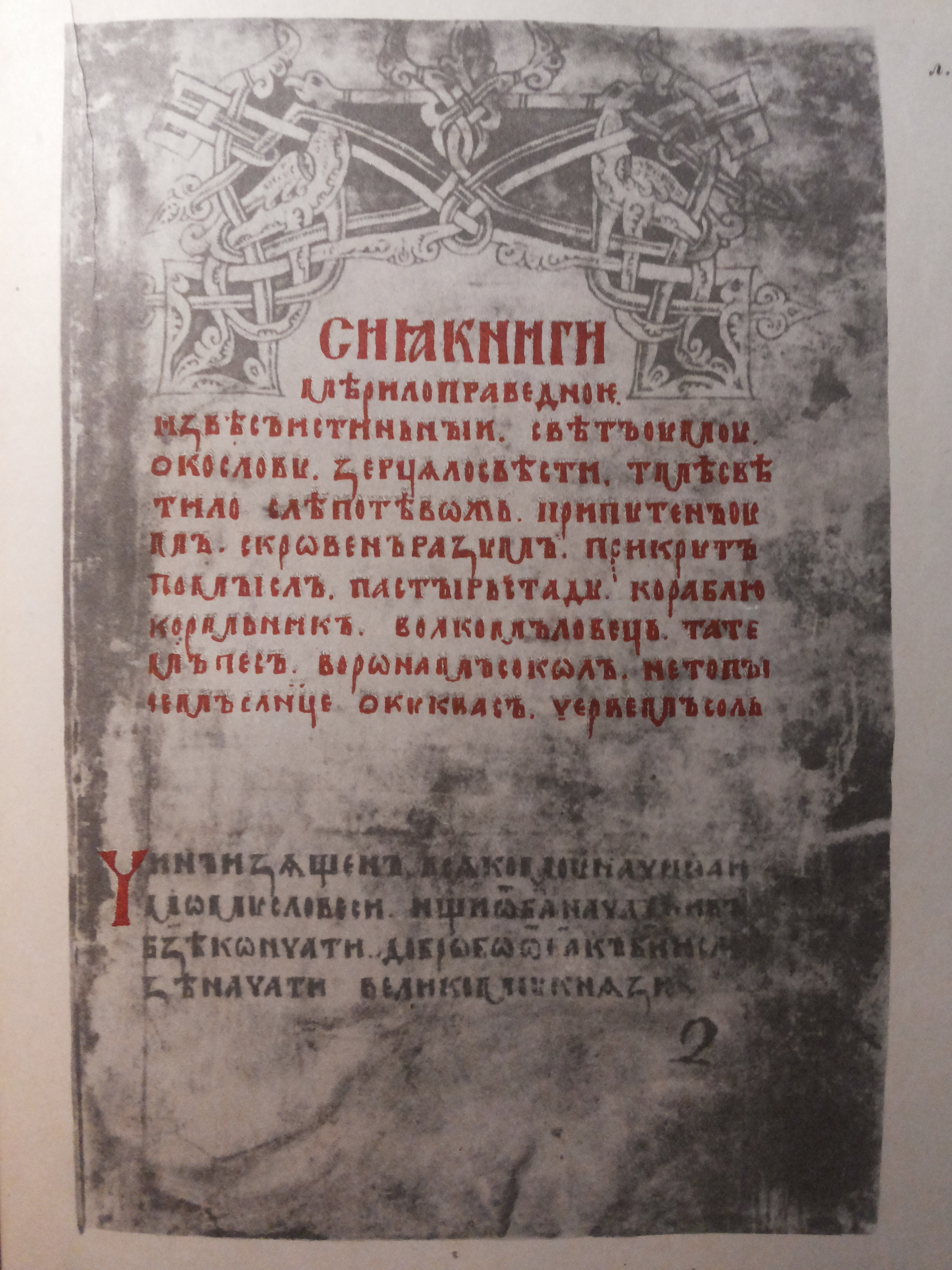
Page of the oldest surviving Trinity (Troitsky) copy of Merilo Pravednoye, 14th century

The Zakón Súdnyi Liúdem ("Law for Judging the People" or "Court Law for the People") is the oldest preserved Slavic legal text. Its source was Byzantine law and it was written in Old Church Slavonic in the late ninth or early tenth century.

In the all-Slavic legal tradition this legal monument is considered to be the first actually Slavic, but in the Bulgarian legal tradition it is preceded by the so-called Krum's laws.

The oldest (short) version contains thirty chapters primarily of penal law adapted from the Byzantine Ekloge ton nomon. Parts of this version are word-for-word translation of the source.

The place of origin of the Zakón Súdnyi Liúdem is a topic of controversy. It has been assigned between the First Bulgarian Empire and Great Moravia. On the basis of Frankish and Bavarian legal patterns in the text, the Slovenian legal historian Sergij Vilfan suggested the late 9th century Principality of Lower Pannonia as a likely place of origin, as part of the state-building process initiated by prince Kocel; the plausibility of this thesis has been recently supported by historian Peter Štih. Its English translators, Dewey and Kleimola, prefer the Moravian theory. Despite its origins, all surviving manuscripts come from Russia. The text itself seems to have reached Russia before the end of the tenth century. It was widely copied in Russia and has some influence on Russian law, but outside of Russia it was forgotten.

== Literature ==
=== Editions ===
- Закон судный людем краткой редакции, М., 1961.
- Закон судный людем пространной и сводной редакции, М., 1961.
- H. W. Dewey and A. M. Kleimola, eds. Zakon Sudnyj Ljudem (Court Law for the People). Ann Arbor, 1977.
  Contains an English translation.

=== Sources ===
- Павлов А. С., Первоначальный славяно- русский Номоканон, Казань, 1869.
- Флоринский Т. Д., Древнейший памятник болг. права «Закон судный людем», К., 1904
- Бобчев С., Един паматник на старото българско право (Законъ соудный людьмъ), «Периодическо списание на Българското книжовно Дружество», С., 1901–02, кн. 62
- Ганев В., Закон соудный людьмъ, С., 1959
- Андреев М., Является ли «Закон соудный людьмъ» древнеболгарским юридическим памятником?, в сб.: Славянский архив, M., 1959;
- Hube R., О znaczeniu Prawa Rzymskiego i Rzymsko-Byzantynskiego u narodów slovianskich, Warsz., 1868
- Oroschakoff H., Ein Denkmal des bulgarischen Rechts, Stuttg., 1915
- Kadlec K., Introduction а l'étude comparative de l’histoire du droit public des peuples slaves, P., 1933.
- Максимович К. А. Законъ соудьныи людьмъ. Источниковедческие и лингвистические аспекты исследования славянского юридического памятника. М., 2004.
