= Kormchaia Book =

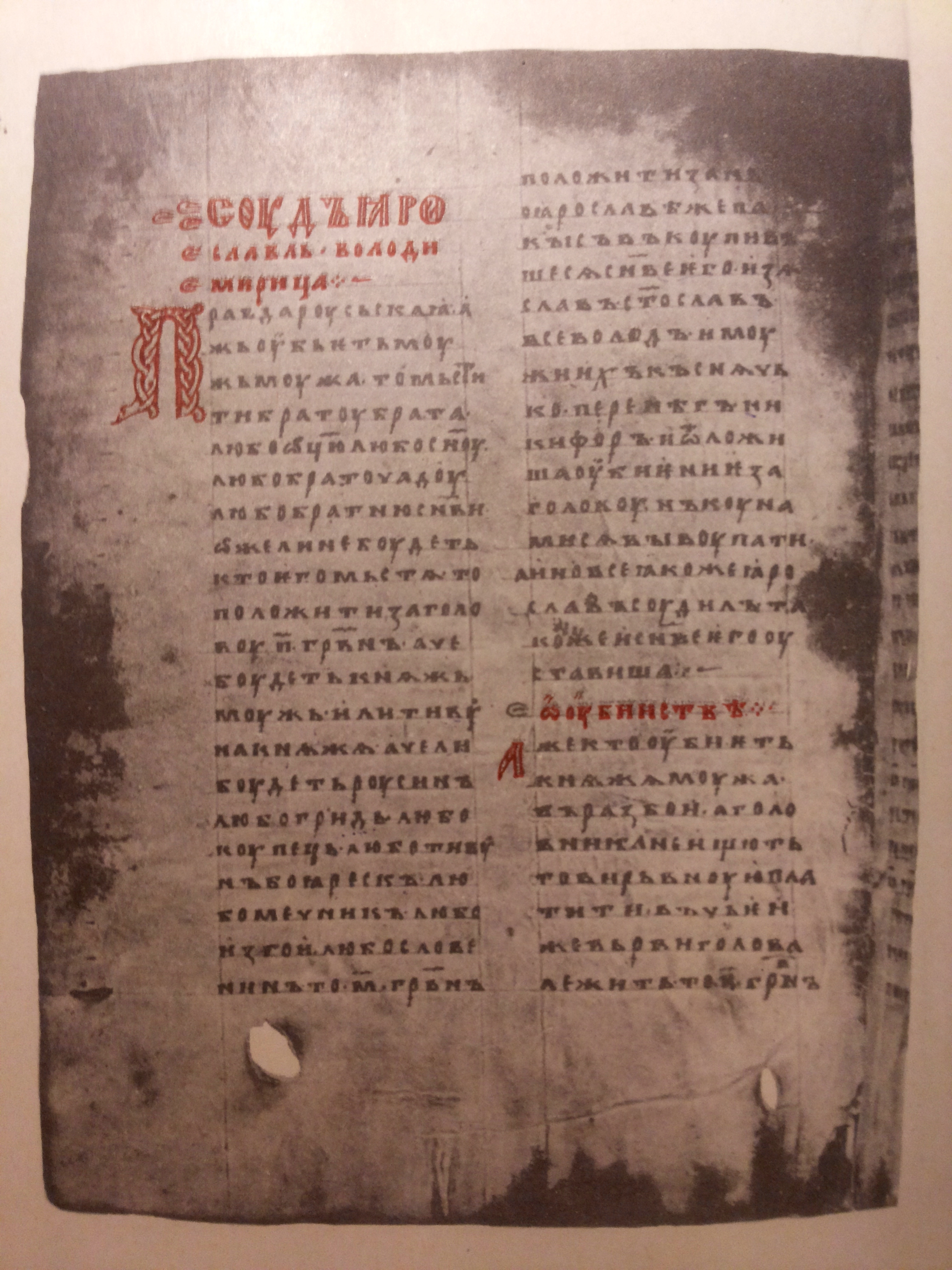
First page of oldest surviving copy of Russkaya Pravda (Vast version) from the Synodic Kormchaia

The Kormchaia Book, also known as the Books of the Pilot (Russian: Ко́рмчая книга, Ко́рмчая, from кормчий, Church Slavonic: кормчїй 'helmsman, ship's pilot'; Pidalion (Russian: Пида́лион from Ancient Greek: Πηδάλιον, Πηδαλίων 'stern oar, helm, handle of helm, rudder') or Nomocanon (Russian: Номокано́н from Ancient Greek: Νομοκανών from νόμος 'law, statute' + κᾰνών 'canon, rule'), are collections of church and secular law (see also Byzantine law), which constituted guide books for the management of the church and for the church court of Orthodox Slavic countries and were also the transmission of several older texts. They were written in Old Church Slavonic and Old East Slavic.

== History ==
The Kormchaia Book goes back to the Byzantine Nomocanon, composed in the 6th century by John Scholasticus, Patriarch of Constantinople. The Nomocanon was translated for the Bulgarian Church in the second half of the 9th century and then was spread to Rus'. Nomocanons in Russian processing were called Kormchaia Books at the end of the 11th century; they were supplemented in Russia by the norms of secular law.

The Kormchaia was translated from Greek into (Old) Church Slavonic in Serbia about 1225, which was proposed by Russian Metropolitan Kirill as a guideline for the management of the Russian Church in 1274 at the Church Council in Vladimir (a number of researchers believe that this event took place in Kiev a year earlier.)

In the 13th century, another type of Kormchaia appeared, where some elements of the Bulgarian and Serbian Kormchaia Books were consolidated. This was the so-called Saint Sophia version, or the Synodic version (named from its place of discovery in the St. Sophia Cathedral of Novgorod and which was then kept in the Synodic library in Moscow). It was also supplemented by Russian articles: Russkaya Pravda, the church statutes of the princes Vladimir and Yaroslav, the rules of the 1274 Council and others. The Synodic Kormchaia became widespread and is known in a large number of copies.

In the late 15th and early 16th centuries, the Kormchaia Books were revised due to the large number of variant readings. In 1650, the so-called Joseph Kormchaia (of Patriarch Joseph) was published and based on Zakonopravilo of Saint Sava. In 1653, the Nikon Kormchaia (of Patriarch Nikon) was published. In 1787, the so-called Ekaterina Kormchaia was published. The latest edition of the Kormchaia was published in 1816.

Since 1816 the Book of Rules (Kniga pravil) have been published instead of the Kormchaia Books in Russia. The Book of Rules contains a collection of the local canons (rules) of the Russian Orthodox Church as well as older canons adopted at the Ecumenical councils.

== See also ==
- Nomocanon
- Merilo Pravednoye
- Kievan Rus' law

== Scholar literature ==
- Каталог славяно-русских рукописных книг XVI века, хранящихся в Российском государственном архиве древних актов / Федер. арх. агентство; сост.: О. В. Беляков и др.; под ред. Л. В. Мошковой. — 2-е стер. изд.. — М. : Древлехранилище, 2006. Вып. 1 : Апостол — Кормчая. — 2006. — 589 с.

=== Editions ===
- Палеографический снимок текста Русской правды по новгородской Кормчей книге XIII века / Скопир. с подлинника студентами Ист.-филол. фак. Имп. с-петерб. ун-та под рук. И. И. Срезневского. — СПб. : Тип. Якобсон, 1888.
- Мазуринская кормчая : Памятник межславянских культурных связей XIV—XVI вв.: Исследование. Тексты. — М. : Индрик, 2002. — 853 с.
- Кормчая, напечатанная с оригинала патриарха Иосифа. — М.: Журнал «Церковь», 1912 (1650). — 1481 с.Часть 1Часть 2Часть 3Часть 4Часть 5Часть 6Часть 7Часть 8Часть 9Часть 10Часть 11Часть 12Часть 13Часть 14

=== Sources ===
- Розенкампф Густав Андреевич. Обозрение Кормчей книги в историческом виде / соч. бар. Розенкампфа; Издано О-вом истории и древностей рос. при Имп. Моск. ун-те. — Москва : В Университетской типографии, 1829. — 274 c.
- Розенкампф Густав Андреевич. Обозрение Кормчей книги в историческом виде / соч. бар. Г. А. Розенкампфа. — 2-е изд.. — СПб. : В тип. Имп. Акад. наук, 1839. — Второе тиснение с многими переменами и прибавлениями, начатое сочинителем, а по кончине его изданное В.А[настасевичем]. (Розенкампф Густав Андреевич, Печерин Владимир Сергеевич).
- Калачов Николай Васильевич. О значении Кормчей в системе древнего русского права / соч. Н. Калачова, д. чл. Имп. о-ва истории и древностей рос. при Моск. ун-те. — М. : В унив. тип., 1850. — Из № 3 и 4 Чтений, издав. Имп. о-вом истории и древностей рос. при Моск. ун-те, 1847 г.
- Павлов Алексей Степанович. Первоначальный славяно-русский Номоканон / соч. А Павлова. — Казань : В унив. тип., 1869. (Павлов Алексей Степанович, Срезневский Измаил Иванович)
- Павлов Алексей Степанович. 50-я глава Кормчей книги, как исторический и практический источник русского брачного права / А. Павлова, заслуж. орд. проф. Имп. моск. ун-та. — М. : В унив. тип. (М. Катков), 1887. — 452 с.. — Отт. из Ученых зап. Имп. моск. ун-та. — Посвящ. архиеп. Алексию Виленскому и Литовскому.
- Срезневский Измаил Иванович. Обозрение древних русских списков Кормчей книги : С прил. фототип. снимка из Ефрем. Кормчей. — СПб. : Тип. Имп. Акад. наук, 1897. — 206 с.
- Срезневский Измаил Иванович. Обозрение древних русских списков Кормчей книги : с прил. фототип. снимка из Ефремовской кормчей / труд И. И. Срезневского. — Из Сб. ОРЯС, Т.65, N 2.
- Бенешевич Владимир Николаевич. Древнеславянская Кормчая XIV титулов без толкований = Syntagma XIV titulorum sine scholiis / изд. Отд-ния рус. яз. и словесности Имп. Акад. анук. — СПб. : Тип. Имп. Акад. наук, 1906—1907. — 3 т.
- Обнорский Сергей Петрович. О языке Ефремовской кормчей XII века. — СПб. : Тип. Имп. Акад. наук, 1912. (Исследования по русскому языку; Т.3, вып.1)
- Максимович К. А. Законъ соудьныи людьмъ. Источниковедческие и лингвистические аспекты исследования славянского юридического памятника. — М., 2004. (в том числе об Устюжской Кормчей XIII—XIV веков).
- Максимович К. А. К вопросу о «мефодиевских» папистских схолиях в Кормчей Ефремовской редакции / К. А. Максимович // Славяноведение. — 2006. — N 2. — С. 78-88.
- Белякова Елена Владимировна. Мазуринская редакция кормчей и ее историко-культурное значение на Руси : Автореф. дис… канд. ист. наук. — М. : б. и., 1998.
- Белякова Е. В. «Латгальские листы» — древнейший список Чудовской редакции Кормчей / Е. В. Белякова, Н. Морозова // Древняя Русь. Вопросы медиевистики. — 2011. — № 3, Ч. 1 (сентябрь). — С. 17-18.
- Белякова Е. В. Издание Кормчей Книги и проблема смены культурной ориентации / Е. В. Белякова // Российская история. — 2011. — N 4. — С. 103—113. — Примеч.: с. 111—113.
- Белякова Е. В. Издание печатной Кормчей (1653) и «византизм» в русской государственности / Е. В. Белякова // Вестник Московского университета. Сер. 8, История. — 2012. — № 5. — С. 34-50.
- Полознев Д. Ф. Место Церкви в государстве и обществе по Соборному уложению 1649 года и Кормчей 1650 года. — С. 101—104.
- Цвєткова Ю.В. Єфремівська Кормча–джерело права Київської Русі (кінець ХІ–початок ХІІ ст.). Автореферат дис.. … к.ю.н. 12.00.01. Київ: КНУ ім. Т. Шевченка, 2003. 20 с.
