= Sudebnik of 1497 =

Collection of laws introduced by Ivan III in 1497

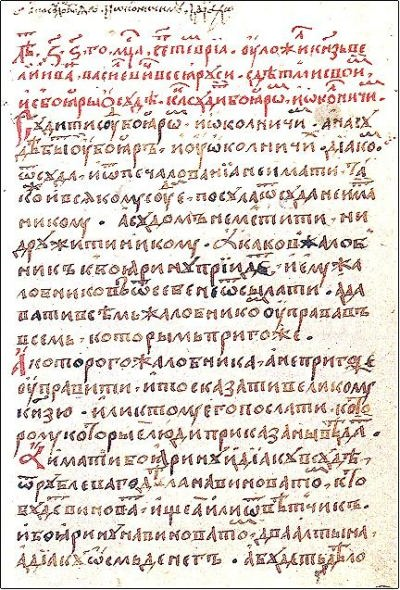
Page from the Sudebnik

The Sudebnik of 1497 (Russian: Судебник 1497 года), also known as the Sudebnik of Ivan III (Russian: Судебник Ивана III), was a collection of laws introduced by Ivan III in 1497. It played a big part in the centralisation of the Russian state, the creation of all-Russian legislation, and the elimination of feudal fragmentation. It was later replaced by the Sudebnik of 1550 under Ivan IV.

== Content ==
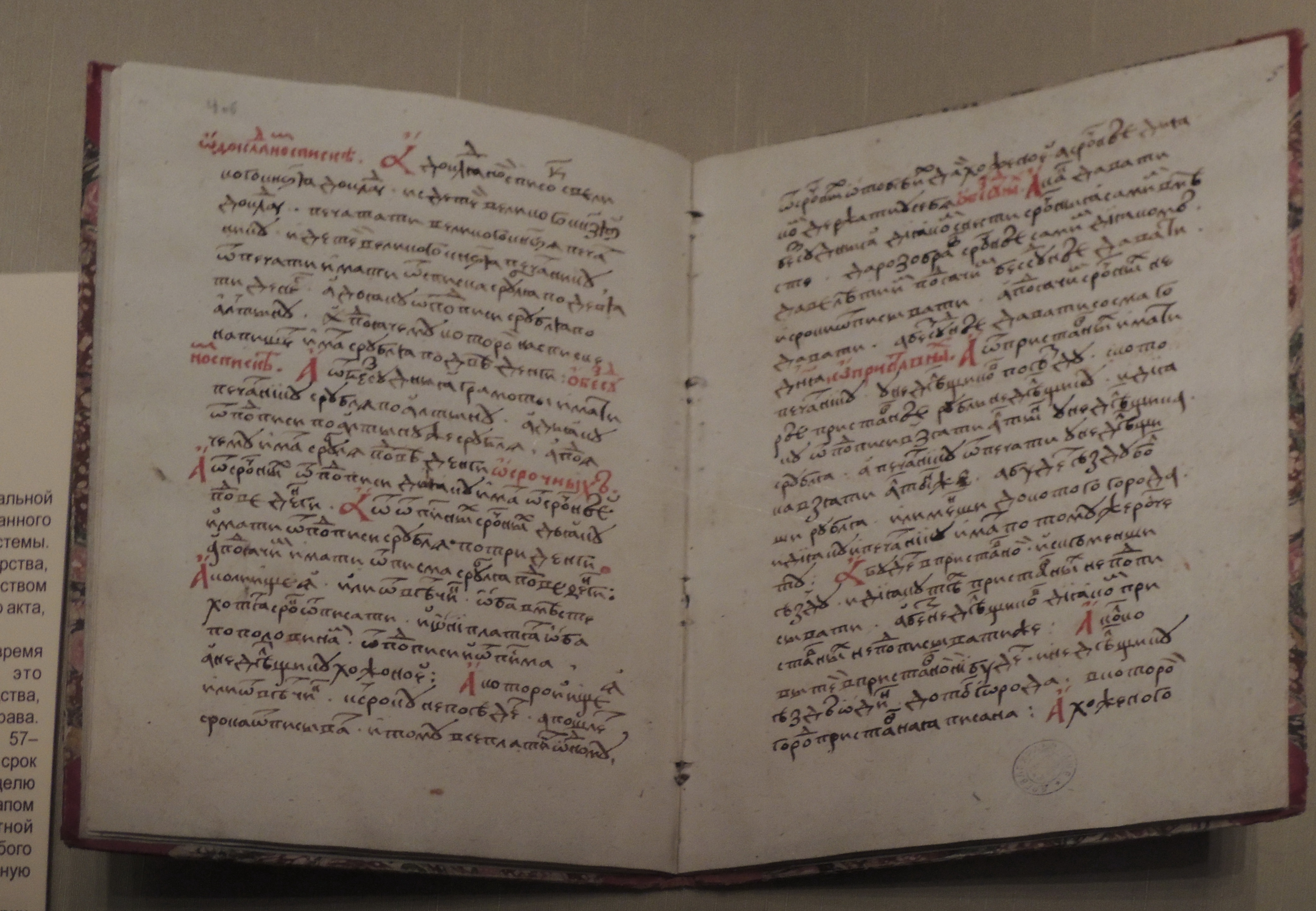
Sudebnik of 1497 in the Russian State Archive of Ancient Documents

The Sudebnik replaced the former legal charters of different Russian principalities as a code for the entire state. It set up an order of court procedures and legal norms, binding uniformly on all parts of the state and strengthening the central authority in Moscow.

The Sudebnik takes its roots from earlier law codes, including the Russkaya Pravda, the Pskov Judicial Charter, princely decrees, and common law, the regulations of which had been upgraded with reference to social and economic changes. The Sudebnik was overall a collection of legal procedures. It established a universal system of the judicial bodies of the state, defined their competence and subordination, and regulated legal fees. The Sudebnik expanded the range of acts considered punishable by the standards of criminal justice (e.g., sedition, sacrilege, slander). It also renewed the concept of different kinds of a crime. Sudebnik established the investigative nature of legal proceedings. It provided different kinds of punishment, such as the death penalty and flagellation. In order to protect the feudal landownership, Sudebnik introduced certain limitations in the law of estates, increased the term of limitation of legal actions with regards to princely lands, introduced flagellation for the violation of property boundaries of princely, boyar and monastic lands – violation of peasant land boundaries entailed a fine. The Sudebnik also introduced a fee (пожилое, or pozhiloye) for peasants who wanted to leave their feudal lord (Крестьянский выход, or Krestiyansky vykhod), and also established a universal day (November 26) across the Russian state for peasants who wanted to switch their masters (Юрьев день, or Yuri's Day).

== See also ==
- Stoglav
- Sobornoye Ulozheniye
- Law of Russia
- Law of the Soviet Union
