= Sobornoye Ulozheniye =

Legal code promulgated in 17th-century Russia

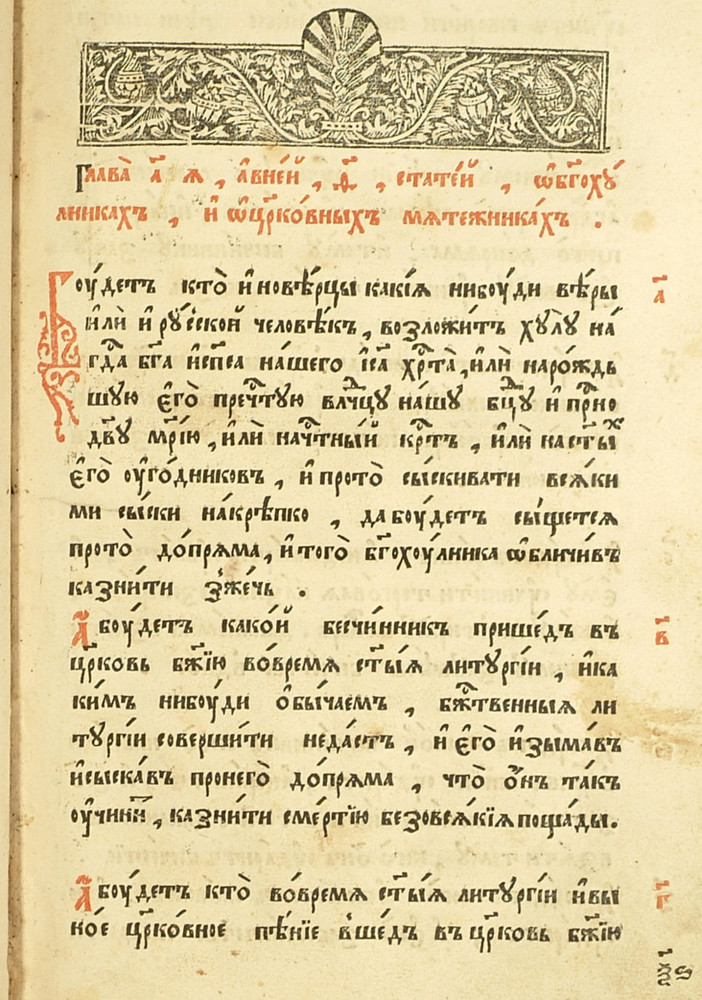
First chapter of the code

The Sobornoye Ulozheniye (Note: Also transliterated as Sobornoe Ulozhenie.) (Russian: Соборное уложение, lit. 'Council Code', IPA: [sɐˈbornəjə ʊlɐˈʐɛnʲɪjə]) was a legal code promulgated in 1649 by the Zemsky Sobor under Alexis of Russia as a replacement for the Sudebnik of 1550 introduced by Ivan IV of Russia. The code survived well into the 19th century (up to 1832), when its articles were revised under the direction of Mikhail Speransky.

The code consolidated Russia's slaves and free peasants into a new serf class and pronounced class hereditary as unchangeable (see Russian serfdom). The new code prohibited travel between towns without an internal passport. The Russian nobility agreed to serve in the army, but were granted the exclusive privilege of owning serfs.

The law code conceded many demands that were raised in the preceding decades, it satisfied the nobility's demand to retrieve runaway serfs without a time-limit, and which allowed the 'serf bondage to the soil' to later evolve into a far more comprehensive serfdom system in the 18th century. Further, the code also forbade boyars in accepting taxpayers as bondsmen. It attacked the influence of the clergy by refusing them to accept landed estates and reduced the competence of the ecclesiastical courts.

== The causes of promulgation ==
As the Time of Troubles ended, a new dynastic government, the Romanovs, commenced active law-making. An intensive growth in the number of edicts ("ukases") since the Sudebnik of 1550 can be seen from the following data:

Years	edicts
1550–1600	83
1601–1610	17
1611–1620	97
1621–1630	90
1631–1640	98
1641–1648	63

In the period of 1550-1610, only 100 edicts were issued, but in the years 1611-1648 the number of edicts was 348. In total there were 448 edicts. This led to the situation in the Russian state that many edicts were not only obsolete, but sometimes contradicted each other.

This chaos was contributed to by the scattering of normative acts throughout different state institutes (traditionally new edicts were made on demand of some prikaz, and after their promulgation were attached to an edict book of this prikaz). There was also an absence of coordination in law application: a new article in this book was often known only to the statesmen of the given prikaz. Also, the casual character of legal rules was becoming inefficient. The legislators now sought to regulate legal rules, that is, to pass on to a normative interpretation of legal rules.

The Salt Riot, which broke out in Moscow in 1648, also contributed to the promulgation of the Sobornoye Ulozheniye, one of the demands of the rioters being to call the Zemsky Sobor and to make a new legal code. The riot was suppressed, but as one of the concessions to the rioters, the tsar called the Zemsky Sobor, which continued to work until the promulgation of Sobornoye Ulozheniye in 1649.

== Lawmaking ==
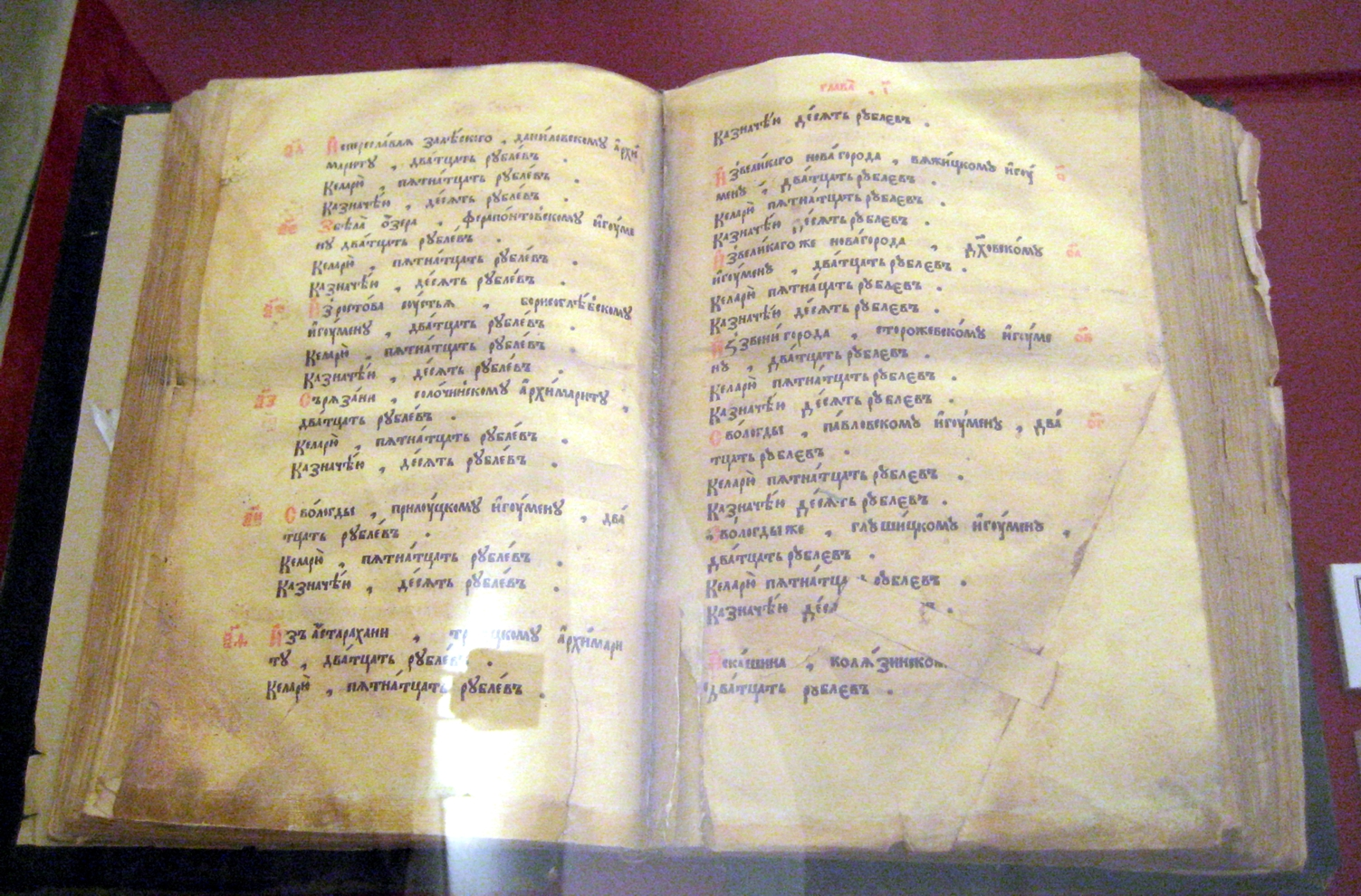
A copy from Ferapontov Monastery

A special committee headed by Prince Nikita Odoyevsky was created to draft the new legal code. Members of the committee included Prince Semyon Prozorovsky, an okolnichy prince (one of highest ranks of boyars in old Russia), Fyodor Volkonsky, as well as the scribes Gavrila Leontyev and Fyodor Griboyedov. At that time, the practical job of the Zemsky Sobor began.

The Zemsky Sobor was intended to consider the bill of the Ulozheniye. It had many members, including representatives of posad people communities. The Zemsky Sobor consisted of two houses. The tsar, the Boyar Duma and Consecrated Sobor comprised one house, and elected people of different ranks took part in sessions of another house.

Deputies of the nobility and posad people had a major impact on the adoption of many of the norms of the Ulozheniye. On 29 January 1649, the drafting and editing of the Ulozheniye concluded. The original of this historical document is a scroll consisting of 959 narrow columns. At the end of the document are 315 signatures of Sobor members. The signatures of the scribes are located at the margins of the columns. Centuries later, during the reign of Catherine II, a silver ark was created to store this original scroll. At the present time, the original of the Sobornoye Ulozheniye is housed in the Kremlin Armoury.

Later, a copy of the scroll was transcribed in book format. From this book, the Ulozheniye was reprinted twice in 1649, with 1200 copies made each time. The Sobornoye Ulozheniye of 1649 is considered a new stage in the development of Russian jurisprudence.

All Sobor members endorsed handwritten copies of the Ulozheniye with their signatures, and these copies were then distributed to all state offices (prikazes) in Moscow as a guide for policy and law.

Elected people sent their own amendments and additions to the Duma as petitions of Zemstvo. Some of these were enacted in cooperation with the elected officials, the Duma and the Tsar.

Vasily Klyuchevsky singles out several technical stages at process of lawmaking of the Ulozheniye:

1. Codification — (work with sources, editing) by the committee headed by Prince Odoevskii.
2. Conference — bringing up petition for discussion.
3. Revision — revision and editing of bills by Duma and Tsar.
4. Legislative decision — a common decision about one or another article of the Ulozheniye.
5. Hand signing — signing of code of laws unanimously by members of the Sobor.

The Sobornoye Ulozheniye represents the first attempt by Russian legislators to form system of norms and classify them by areas of law. Significant attention was given to procedural law.

== Sources of the Ulozheniye ==
The sources of the Sobornoye Ulozheniye originated both from Russian and international law.

1. Books of orders of prikazes - from the moment of the appearance of a prikaz, the current law in the corresponding area of law was fixed in accordance with that prikaz
2. Sudebnik of 1497 and Sudebnik by Ivan IV.
3. Statutes of Lithuania (1588) had been used as model (pattern) of legal technicality
4. Petitions
