= Stoglav =

Decisions of the Russian church council of 1551

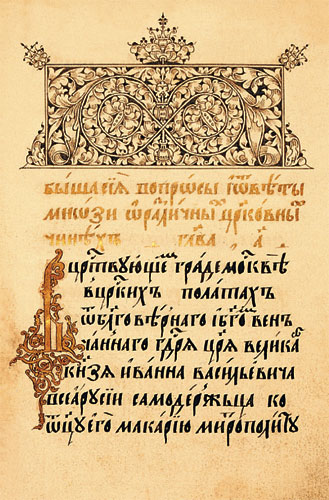
One of the manuscripts containing One Hundred Chapters

The Book of One Hundred Chapters, also called Stoglav (Стоглав) in Russian ("Hundred chapters"), is a collection of decisions of the Russian church council of 1551 that regulated the canon law and ecclesiastical life in the Tsardom of Russia, especially the everyday life of the Russian clergy.

The book is shaped in the form of answers to some 100 questions posed by Ivan IV of Russia. A constant theme running through the chapters is the Byzantine symphonia (harmony) between the 'priesthood' and the 'kingdom'.

The Book of Hundred Chapters canonized the native Muscovite rituals and practices at the expense of those accepted in Greece and other Eastern Orthodox countries. As a result this church code was never accepted by the Russian monks residing on Mount Athos.

In the mid-17th century, the Old Believers championed the Stoglav in order to undermine Patriarch Nikon's authority and his ecclesiastical reforms. The Great Moscow Synod of 1667 condemned the Stoglav and its practices as heretical and banned the book from usage for 200 years. This contributed to a great schism of the Russian church known as the Raskol.

There are at least 100 manuscripts of the Stoglav, all of them produced by the Old Believers. The official church historians of the 18th and 19th centuries (such as Platon Levshin) discarded these texts as spurious. Their authenticity was reasserted by historian Ivan Belyayev in 1863.
