= Sudebnik of 1550 =

Russian legal code

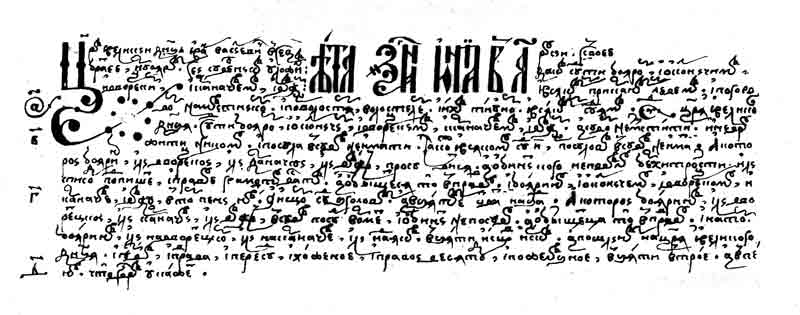
Title page of the Sudebnik of 1550

The Sudebnik of 1550 (Russian: Судебник 1550 года), also known as the Sudebnik of Ivan IV (Russian: Судебник Ивана IV), was an expansion and revision of the Sudebnik of 1497 by Ivan IV of Russia, a code of laws originally instituted by Ivan III, his grandfather. It is considered the result of the first Russian parliament of feudal estates (Zemsky Sobor).

The Sudebnik of 1550 liquidated the aristocracy's judicial privileges and strengthened the role of state judicial bodies.

The Sudebnik also provided for the active participation of the elective representatives of local communities (rural heads, jurymen, tselovalniki, dvorskie etc.) in legal proceedings. The arrest of suspects could be made only at the consent of the local community. The representative of a community (dyak) participated in judicial office-work. Town and rural communities had the right to self-management and the distribution of taxes. The Sudebnik confirmed the right of peasants to leave their feudal lords. The law precisely defined that the peasant had the right to leave the landowner after the payment of two fixed fees (a "break-away" fee called pozhiloye and a transportation fee called povoz).

== Sources ==
- Беляев И.Д. Крестьяне на Руси. Исследование о постепенном изменении значения крестьян в русском обществе. М. 1891 Типография Общества распространения полезных книг
- Monuments of Imperial Russian Law: Medieval Origins
