= Moon (surname) =

Moon is a surname. Notable people with the surname include:

== People ==
- Ah Moon (born 1991), Singer from Myanmar
- Ajung Moon, Korean-Canadian experimental roboticist
- Alan R. Moon (born 1951), British board game designer
- Alex Moon (born 1971), English boxer
- Alexander Moon (born 1996), English rugby union player
- Aliona Moon (born 1989), Moldovan singer
- Allan Moon (born 1976), Canadian musician
- Angus Moon (born 1962), British barrister
- Annie Moon (born 2002), South Korean singer and rapper
- Anthony Moon (footballer) (born 2001), Guamanian footballer
- Arif Hossain Moon (born 1968), Bangladeshi footballer
- Arthur Moon (1902–1973), Australian army doctor
- August Moon (1937–2023), American musician and activist
- Ballynennan Moon, Famous racing greyhound
- Beata Moon (born 1969), Korean-American classical pianist and composer
- Ben Moon (rugby union) (born 1989), England international rugby union player
- Ben Moon (climber) (born 1966), British rock climber
- Betty Moon, Canadian-American singer-songwriter
- Bev Moon, New Zealand artist
- Bianca Moon (born 1988), Australian social campaigner
- Billy Moon (1868–1943), English footballer, cricketer, and solicitor
- Black Moon (person) (1821-1893), Lakota military leader
- Bob Moon (rugby league) (1933–2023), Australian rugby league player
- Bob Moon (educationist) (born 1945), British education researcher
- Brenda Moon (1931–2011), British library leader active in Scotland
- Brendan Moon (born 1958), Australia international rugby union player
- Bruce Moon (born c. 1951), American art therapist
- Bryce Moon (born 1986), South African soccer player
- Carl Moon (1878–1948), American photographer, artist and writer
- Carlos A. Moon (1906–1953), American painter
- Cary Moon (born 1963), American political activist
- Cecil Moon (1867–1951), English cricketer
- Charles Moon (1923–2001), American politician
- Chris Moon (born 1953), American songwriter
- Colin Moon (born 1957), British author
- Cynthia Charlotte Moon (1828–1895), American Civil War spy
- Dai-won Moon (1942/1943–2026), Mexican taekwondo practitioner
- Darius Moon (1851–1939), American architect
- Darvin Moon (1963–2020), American poker player
- David Moon (politician) (born 1979), American politician
- David Moon (historian), British environmental historian
- David Moon (rugby league) (born 1964), Australian rugby league footballer
- David A. Moon, American computer scientist
- Dawn Xiana Moon (born 1981), American singer
- Dean Moon (1927–1987), American racing driver
- Dean Moon (rugby league) (born 1975), Australian rugby league footballer
- Debbie Moon (born 1901), English screenwriter and author
- Don Moon (educator) (1936–2025), American academic and physicist
- Don P. Moon (1894–1944), United States Navy admiral
- Dora Kim Moon (1877–1971), Korean-American activist
- Dorothy Moon, American politician and business person from Idaho
- Dre Moon (born 1991), American hip-hop producer
- Edgar Moon (1904–1976), Australian tennis player
- Edwin Moon (1886–1920), British aviation pioneer and war hero
- Elizabeth Moon (born 1945), American science fiction and fantasy author
- Ellie Moon, Canadian actor and playwright
- Eric Moon (1923–2016), American librarian and editor
- Fábio Moon (born 1976), Brazilian comic book artist
- Frederick Douglass Moon (1896–1975), American educator, community leader, and writer
- George Moon (1909–1981), British actor
- George Washington Moon (1823–1909), British writer and critic
- Guy Moon (1962–2026), American composer
- Hartley Moon (1877–1946), U.S. Army officer, adjutant general of Alabama
- Jamario Moon (born 1980), American professional basketball player
- Jeremiah Moon (born 1998), American football player
- Joel Moon (born 1988), Australian rugby league player
- Joshua Moon (born 1992), American owner of Kiwi Farms message board
- Keith Moon (1946–1978), drummer for rock band The Who
- Kevin Moon (born 1987), Scottish footballer
- Lorna Moon (1886–1930), American author and screenwriter
- Lottie Moon (1840–1912), American Baptist missionary to China
- Lou Moon, stand-up comedian
- Madeleine Moon (born 1950), British MP for Bridgend
- Mick Moon (Rupert Vance "Mick" Moon, 1892–1986), Australian recipient of the Victoria Cross
- Odas Moon (c.1892–1937), American aviation pioneer
- Parker Thomas Moon (1892–1936), US educator and political scientist
- Parry Moon (1898–1988), American electrical engineer
- Paul Moon (born 1968), New Zealand historian
- Perran Moon (born 1970), British politician
- Peter Moon (disambiguation)
- Philip Burton Moon (1907–1994), British nuclear physicist
- Reuben Moon (1847-1919), American politician
- Robert Charles Moon (1844–1914), English ophthalmologist
- Robert James Moon (1911–1989), American physicist, chemist and engineer
- Ronald Moon (born 1940), Chief Justice of the Hawaii State Supreme Court
- Ronald Moon (1932–2011), Australian Anglican priest
- Rupert Moon (born 1968), Welsh rugby union player
- Rupert Vance Moon: see Mick Moon
- Sarah Moon (born 1941), French photographer
- Sheri Moon (born 1970), American actress and fashion designer
- Slim Moon (born 1967), American record producer and musician
- Wally Moon (1930–2018), American major league baseball player
- Warren Moon (born 1956), quarterback in US and Canadian football
- Warren Moon (born 1982), Australian soccer player
- William Moon (1818–1894), English inventor of Moon type, a writing system for the blind

== Fictional characters ==
- Alfie Moon, in the British soap opera EastEnders
- Alfred Moon, in the British soap opera EastEnders
- Anthony Moon, in the British soap opera EastEnders
- Austin Moon, from the Disney sitcom Austin & Ally
- Bert Moon, in the British soap opera EastEnders
- Craig Moon, in the British soap opera EastEnders
- Danny Moon, in the British soap opera EastEnders
- Daphne Moon, from the TV series Frasier
- Eddie Moon, in the British soap opera EastEnders
- Eli Moon, the Cardcaptors name for the Cardcaptor Sakura character Eriol Hiiragizawa
- Ernie Moon, in the British soap opera EastEnders
- Howard Moon, in the comedy series The Mighty Boosh
- Jake Moon, in the British soap opera EastEnders
- Kat Slater, in the British soap opera EastEnders
- Liza Moon, in the British soap opera EastEnders
- Maxwell Moon, in the British soap opera EastEnders
- Michael Moon, in the British soap opera EastEnders
- Molly Moon, from the children's book series of the same name
- Nana Moon, in the British soap opera EastEnders
- Pandora Moon, from the British TV series Skins
- Ruby Moon, in the series Cardcaptor Sakura
- Scarlett Butcher, in the British soap opera EastEnders
- Spencer Moon, in the British soap opera EastEnders
- Tommy Moon, in the British soap opera EastEnders
- Tyler Moon, in the British soap opera EastEnders
- William Moon, in the British soap opera EastEnders

== See also ==
- Moon (disambiguation)
- Moon (given name)
- List of people with the Korean family name Moon
- Moon (Korean name)
