= David Moon =

David or Dave Moon may refer to:

- David A. Moon, American computer scientist and Lisp developer
- David Moon (historian), British professor
- David Moon (politician) (born 1979), Maryland legislator
- David Moon (rugby league) (born 1964), Australian rugby league player
- David Moon (Jersey politician), candidate in the 1996 Jersey general election
- Dave Moon, American football player chosen in the 1949 NFL draft
- Dave Moon, British television editor of Freshers
- Dave Moon, Canadian curler on the winning team in the 2003 Canadian Masters Curling Championships
- David Moon, cast member of the Impractical Jokers UK TV series
- David Moon, a minor character on Frasier, an American sitcom

== See also ==
- Moon (surname), including a list of people with the name
- David Mooney (disambiguation)
