= Moon (disambiguation) =

The Moon is Earth's only natural satellite.

Moon may also refer to:

== Celestial bodies ==
- Natural satellite, or moon, a natural object that orbits a planet or minor planet
- Moon, a Chinese asterism corresponding to 37 Tauri

== Arts and entertainment ==
=== Fictional entities ===
- Moon (Transformers), a character in Beast Wars II
- Moon, a fictional character on Jim Henson's Pajanimals
- Moon, a fictional character on Bear in the Big Blue House
- Moon, a character in the Tom Stoppard play The Real Inspector Hound
- Moon, a DLC 4 Zombies map for Call of Duty: Black Ops
- Moon, a Zombies map remastered version for part of the DLC 5 Zombies Chronicles for Call of Duty: Black Ops III
- Moon, one of the protagonists in the Wings of Fire book series
- The Moon, a recurring character from The Mighty Boosh
- Moon, a character in the Adventure Time miniseries "Stakes"

=== Film and television ===
- "Moon", an episode of Teletubbies
- Moon (2009 film), a science fiction film starring Sam Rockwell
- Moon (2020 film), a short drama film directed by Zoé Pelchat
- Mooned, a 2023 animated short film that is part of the Despicable Me franchise
- The Moon (2023 film), a South Korean space survival drama film
- Moon (2024 film), an Austrian drama film

=== Games ===
- Moon: Remix RPG Adventure, a 1997 role-playing game for the PlayStation
- Moon (1997 visual novel), a Japanese adult visual novel video game
- Moon (2009 video game), a first-person shooter video game for the Nintendo DS

=== Literature ===
- Al-Qamar or The Moon, the 54th sura of the Qur'an
- Moon Publications, a series of travel guides by Avalon Publishing Group
- "Moon", a horror story by James Herbert
- "The Moon", a poem by Robert Louis Stevenson from A Child's Garden of Verses

=== Music ===
==== Bands ====
- The Moon, a psychedelic rock band featuring David Marks
- The Moons, an English indie rock band
- The Big Moon or the Moon, an English indie rock band
- El Moono or the Moon, an English rock band

==== Albums ====
- Moon (Gackt album) (2002)
- Moon (Kyoko Fukada album)
- Moon (EP), an EP by Kumi Koda
- Moon (Steve Lacy album)
- Moon (Snowbird album) (2014)
- Moon (Kenny Wheeler and John Taylor album) (2001)
- The Moon, a 2002 album by Nowfolk (Ishkan and Moka Only)

==== Songs ====
- "Moon" (Ava song), 2024
- "Moon" (Björk song), 2011
- "Moon" (BTS song), 2020
- "Moon" ((G)I-dle song), 2021
- "Moon" (Kanye West song), 2021
- "Moon"/"Blossom", by Ayumi Hamasaki, 2010
- "The Moon" (song), by Taxi, 2000
- "Moon", by Babymonster from Choom, 2026
- "Moon", by Chon from Grow, 2015
- "Moon", by Everglow from Arrival of Everglow, 2019
- "Moon", by Macintosh Plus from Floral Shoppe, 2012
- "Moon", by NCT Dream from Candy, 2022
- "Moon", by Sia from Colour the Small One, 2004
- "Moon", by Turnstile from Time & Space, 2018
- "The Moon", by Cat Power from The Greatest, 2006
- "The Moon", by Lizzy McAlpine from Angel
- "The Moon", by The Microphones from The Glow Pt. 2, 2001
- "The Moon", by The Swell Season from The Swell Season, 2006

== People ==
- Moon (given name)
- Moon (Korean name)
- Moon (surname)
- Moon (gamer) (born 1986), South Korean professional gamer
- Di "Moon" Zhang, Chinese-American member of I.aM.mE

== Places ==
France

- Moon-sur-Elle, a commune in France

United States

- Moon, Kentucky, an unincorporated community
- Moon Township, Pennsylvania
- Moon, South Dakota, a ghost town
- Moon, Virginia
- Moon, Wisconsin, an unincorporated community

== Other ==
- The Moon (tarot card)
- Moon (astrology)
- FreeX Moon, a German paraglider design
- Moon Motor Car, a United States automotive company
- Moon type, a writing system for the blind
- Mooning, the act of displaying bare buttocks for insult or shock value
- Malibu Moon (1997–2021), American thoroughbred horse

== See also ==
- Luna (disambiguation)
- Lunar month, or one revolution of the Moon around the Earth
- Moon River (disambiguation)
- Moone (disambiguation)
- Moonflower (disambiguation)
- Moonmoon, a "moon of a moon"
- Moonshine, an alcoholic beverage
- moon, the verb of mooning
