= Serfdom in Russia =

Unfree peasant class of Tsarist Russia

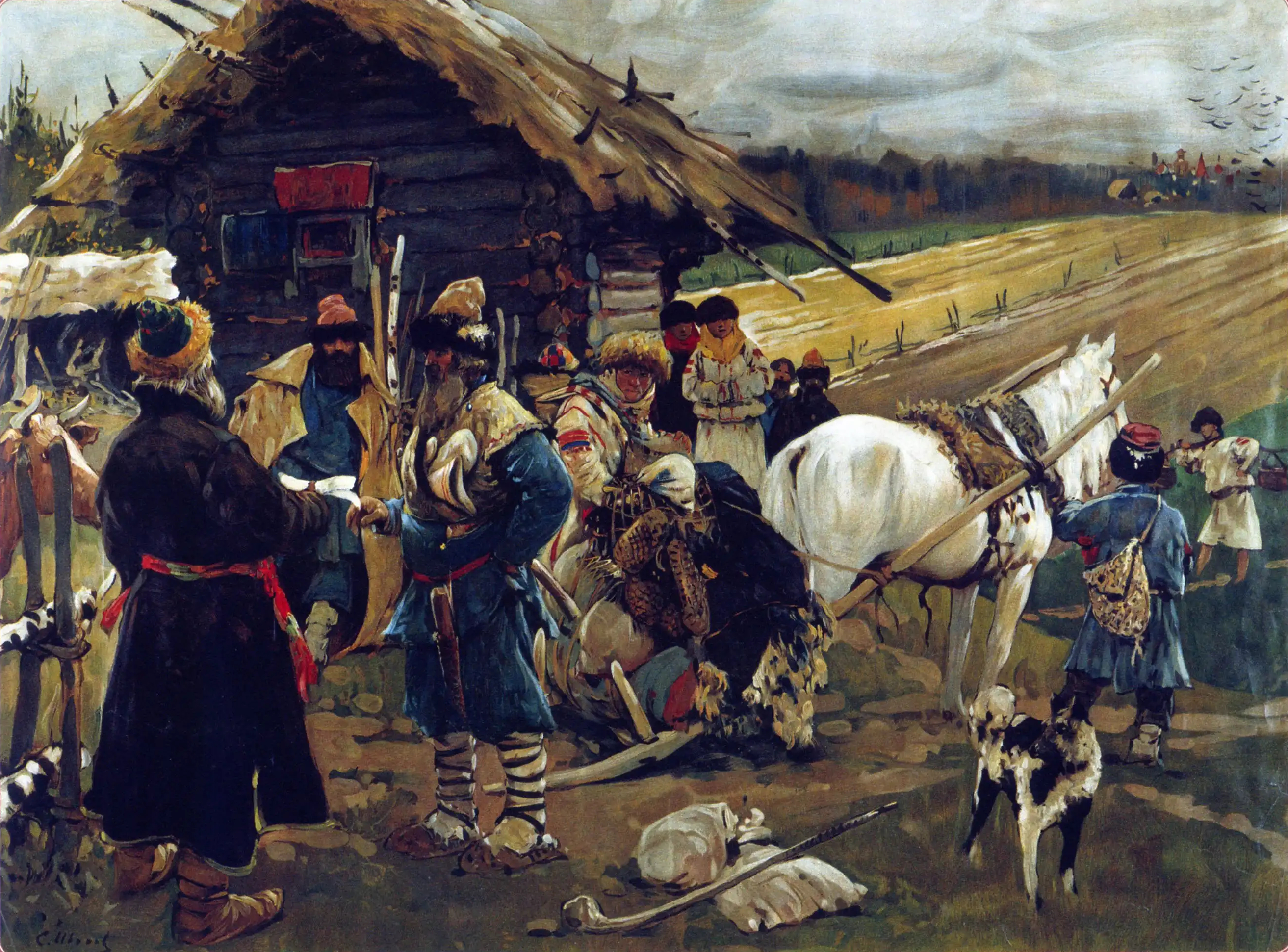
A Peasant Leaving His Landlord on Yuriev Day, painting by Sergei V. Ivanov

In tsarist Russia, the term serf (Russian: крепостной крестьянин, romanized: krepostnoy krest'yanin, lit. 'bonded peasant') meant an unfree peasant who, unlike a slave, originally could be sold only together with the land to which they were "attached". However, this had stopped being a requirement by the 19th century, and serfs were by then practically indistinguishable from slaves. Contemporary legal documents, such as Russkaya Pravda (12th century onwards), distinguished several degrees of feudal dependency of peasants. While another form of slavery in Russia, kholopstvo, was ended by Peter I in 1723, serfdom (Russian: крепостное право, romanized: krepostnoye pravo) was abolished only by Alexander II's emancipation reform of 1861; nevertheless, in times past, the state allowed peasants to sue for release from serfdom under certain conditions, and also took measures against abuses of landlord power.

Serfdom became the dominant form of relation between Russian peasants and nobility in the 17th century. Serfdom most commonly existed in the central and southern areas of the Tsardom of Russia and, from 1721, of the subsequent Russian Empire. Serfdom was rare in Little Russia (parts of today's central Ukraine), other Cossack lands, the Urals and Siberia until the reign of Catherine the Great (r. 1762–1796), when it spread to Ukraine; noblemen began to send their serfs into Cossack lands in an attempt to harvest their extensive untapped natural resources.

The emperor and the highest state officials feared that the peasants' emancipation would be accompanied by popular unrest, given the reluctance of the landlords to lose their serf property, but took some actions to alleviate the situation of the peasantry.

Napoleon tried to emancipate the serfs when he invaded Russia in 1812, but the French Emperor was ineffective in coping with what he subsequently judged the "barbaric" Russian peasantry. Emperor Alexander I (r. 1801–1825) wanted to reform the system but moved cautiously, liberating serfs in Estonia (1816), Livonia (1816), and Courland (1817) only. New laws allowed all classes (except the serfs) to own land, a privilege previously confined to the nobility. Emperor Alexander II abolished serfdom in the emancipation reform of 1861, a few years later than Austria and other German states. Scholars have proposed multiple overlapping reasons to account for the abolition, including fear of a large-scale revolt by the serfs, the government's financial needs, changing cultural sensibilities, and the military's need for soldiers. Despite their newfound freedom, the peasants lacked an important factor – education – as the literacy rate among them was very low by the 1860s and 1870s, especially considering the countryside. The rate gradually increased since then, so that by 1917 the highest in the country was in Central Russia, more specifically only but about half of its population.

== Terminology ==
The term muzhik, or moujik (Russian: мужи́к, IPA: [mʊˈʐɨk]) means "Russian peasant" when it is used in English. This word was borrowed from Russian into Western languages through translations of 19th-century Russian literature, describing Russian rural life of those times, and where the word muzhik was used to mean the most common rural dweller – a peasant – but this was only a narrow contextual meaning.

== History ==
=== Origins ===
The origins of serfdom in Russia may be traced to the 12th century, when the exploitation of the so-called zakups on arable lands (ролейные (пашенные) закупы, roleyniye (pashenniye) zakupy) and corvée smerds (Russian term for corvée is барщина, barschina) was the closest to what is now known as serfdom. According to the Russkaya Pravda, a princely smerd had limited property and personal rights and his escheat was given to the prince.

=== From the 13th century to the 15th century ===
From the 13th century to the 15th century, feudal dependency applied to a significant number of peasants, but serfdom as we know it was still not a widespread phenomenon. In the mid-15th century the right of certain categories of peasants in some votchinas to leave their master was limited to a period of one week before and after Yuri's Day (November 26). The Sudebnik of 1497 officially confirmed this time limit as universal for everybody and also established the amount of the "break-away" fee called pozhiloye (пожилое). The legal code of Ivan III of Russia, Sudebnik (1497), strengthened the dependency of peasants, statewide, and restricted their mobility. The Russians persistently battled against the successor states of the Golden Horde, chiefly the Khanate of Crimea. Annually the Russian population of the borderland suffered from Tatar invasions and slave raids and tens of thousands of noblemen protected the southern borderland (a heavy burden for the state), which slowed its social and economic development and expanded the taxation of peasantry.

=== Transition to full serfdom ===
The Sudebnik of 1550 increased the amount of pozhiloye and introduced an additional tax called za povoz (за повоз, or transportation fee), in case a peasant refused to bring the harvest from the fields to his master. A temporary (Заповедные лета, or forbidden years) and later an open-ended prohibition for peasants to leave their masters was introduced by the decrees of 1597 under the reign of Boris Godunov, which took away the peasants' right to free movement around Yuri's Day, binding the vast majority of the Russian peasantry in full serfdom. These also defined the so-called fixed years (Урочные лета, urochniye leta), or the 5-year time frame for search of the runaway peasants. In 1607, a new ukase defined sanctions for hiding and keeping runaways: the fine had to be paid to the state and pozhiloye – to the previous owner of the peasant.

The Sobornoye Ulozhenie (Соборное уложение, "Code of Law") of 1649 gave serfs to estates, and in 1658, flight was made a criminal offense. Russian landowners eventually gained almost unlimited ownership over Russian serfs. The landowner could transfer the serf without land to another landowner while keeping the serf's personal property and family; however, the landowner had no right to kill the serf. About four-fifths of Russian peasants were serfs according to the censuses of 1678 and 1719; free peasants remained only in the north and north-east of the country.

Most of the dvoryane (nobles) were content with the long time frame for search of the runaway peasants. The major landowners of the country, however, together with the dvoryane of the south, were interested in a short-term persecution due to the fact that many runaways would usually flee to the southern parts of Russia. During the first half of the 17th century the dvoryane sent their collective petitions (челобитные, chelobitniye) to the authorities, asking for the extension of the "fixed years". In 1642, the Russian government established a 10-year limit for search of the runaways and 15-year limit for search for peasants taken away by their new owners.

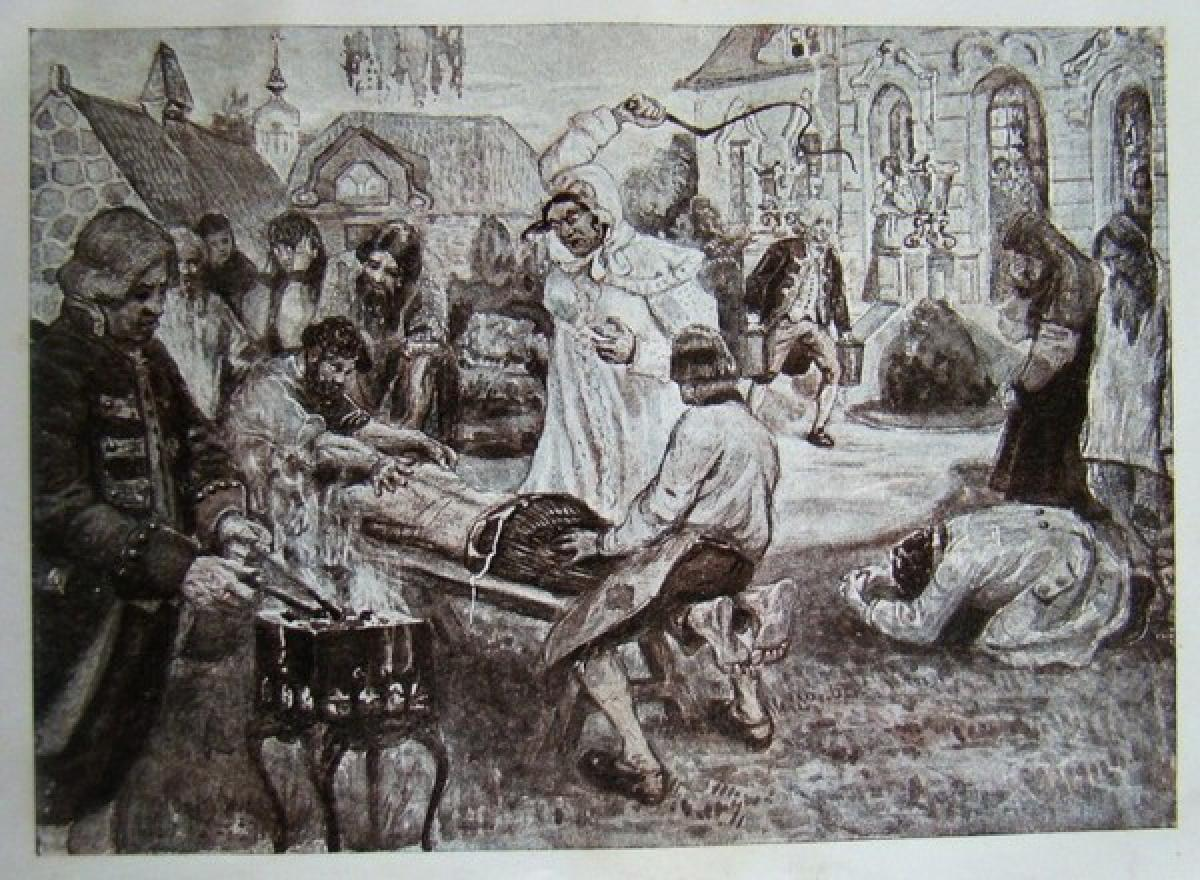
Darya Saltykova punishing one of her serfs

The Sobornoye Ulozhenie introduced an open-ended search for those on the run, meaning that all of the peasants who had fled from their masters after the census of 1626 or 1646–1647 had to be returned. The government would still introduce new time frames and grounds for search of the runaways after 1649, which applied to the peasants who had fled to the outlying districts of the country, such as regions along the border abatises called zasechniye linii (засечные линии) (ukases of 1653 and 1656), Siberia (ukases of 1671, 1683 and 1700), Don (1698) etc. The dvoryane constantly demanded that the search for the runaways be sponsored by the government. The legislation of the second half of the 17th century paid much attention to the means of punishment of the runaways.

Serfdom was hardly efficient; serfs and nobles had little incentive to improve the land. However, it was politically effective. Nobles rarely challenged the tsar for fear of provoking a peasant uprising. Serfs were often given lifelong tenancy on their plots, so they tended to be conservative as well. The serfs took little part in uprisings against the empire as a whole; it was the Cossacks and nomads who rebelled initially and recruited serfs into rebel armies. But many landowners died during serf uprisings against them. The revolutions of 1905 and 1917 happened after serfdom's abolition.

==== Rebellions ====
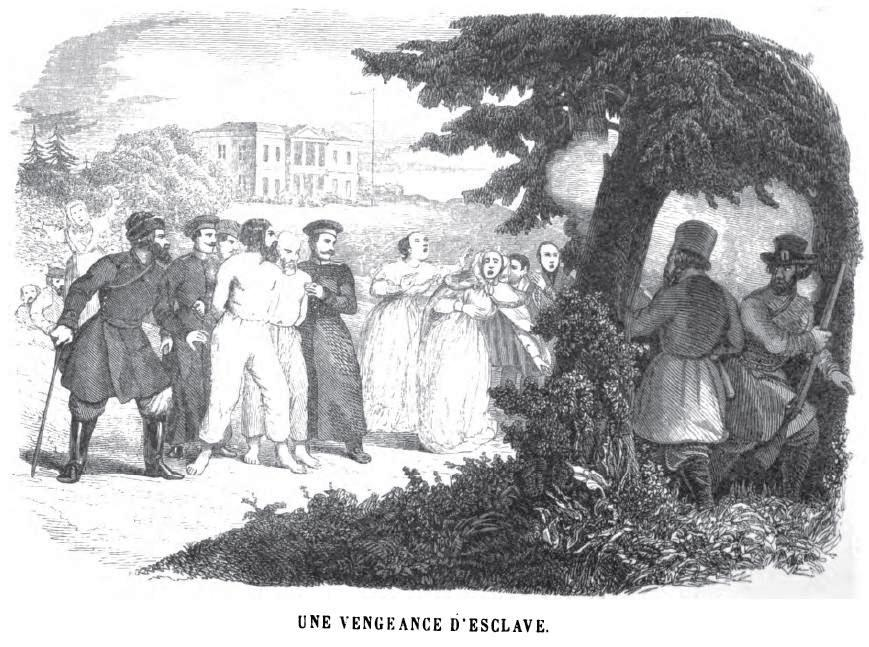
Vengeance of Serfs. Engraving by Charles Michel Geoffroy, 1845

There were numerous rebellions against this bondage, most often in conjunction with Cossack uprisings, such as the uprisings of Ivan Bolotnikov (1606–1607), Stenka Razin (1667–1671), Kondraty Bulavin (1707–1709) and Yemelyan Pugachev (1773–1775). While the Cossack uprisings benefited from disturbances among the peasants, and they in turn received an impetus from Cossack rebellion, none of the Cossack movements were directed against the institution of serfdom itself. Instead, peasants in Cossack-dominated areas became Cossacks during uprisings, thus escaping from the peasantry rather than directly organizing peasants against the institution. Rich Cossacks owned serfs themselves. Between the end of Pugachev's Rebellion and the beginning of the 19th century, there were hundreds of outbreaks across Russia, and there was never a time when the peasantry was completely quiescent.

==== Slaves and serfs ====
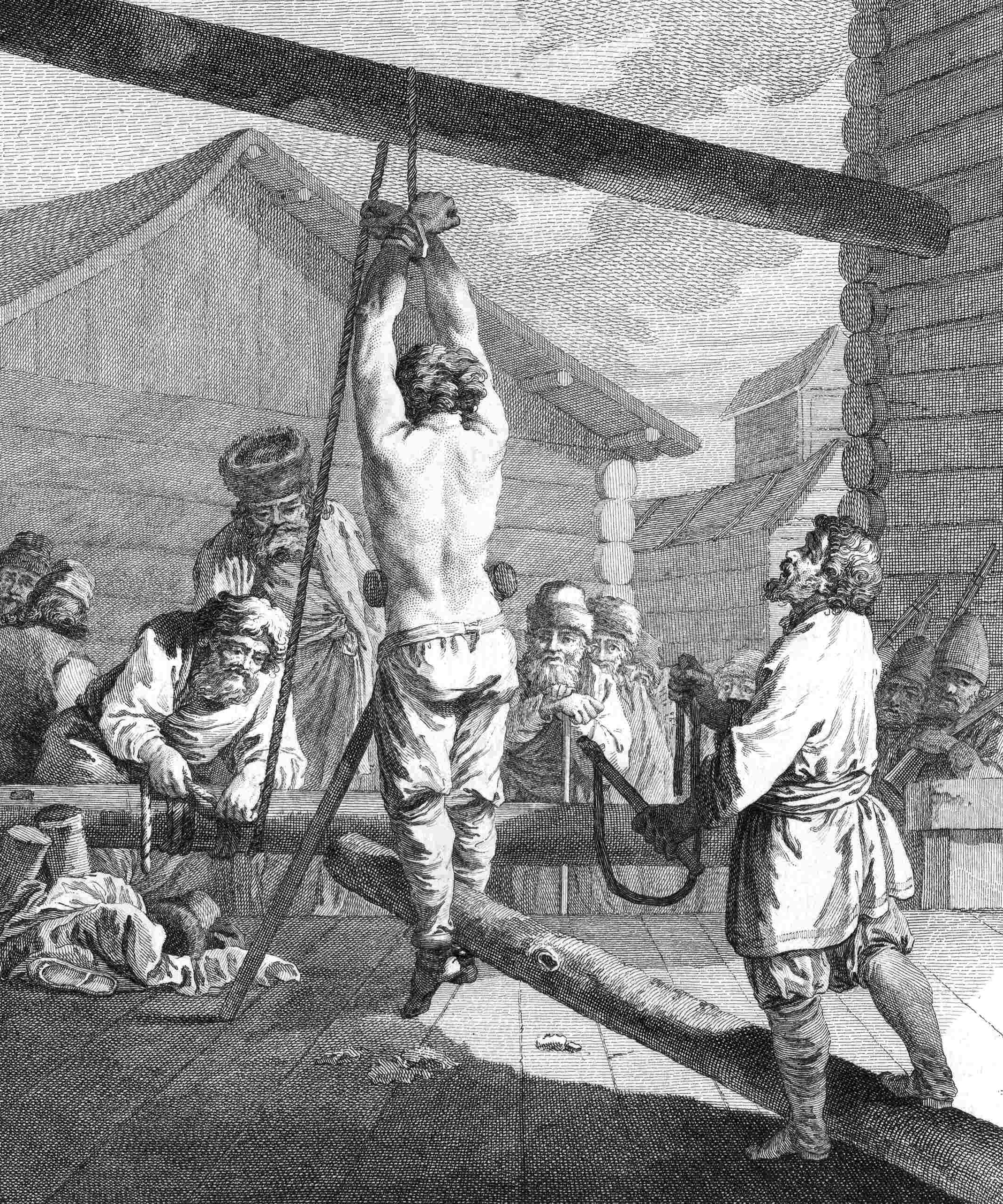
Punishment with a knout

As a whole, serfdom both came and remained in Russia much later than in other European countries. Slavery remained a legally recognized institution in Russia until 1723, when Peter the Great abolished slavery and converted the slaves into serfs. This was relevant more to household slaves because Russian agricultural slaves were formally converted into serfs earlier in 1679.

There was a separate class of peasants who could be sold without land, these were dvorovie lyudi. However, unlike slaves in the classical view, their movable property, religious rights and inviolability were officially protected by law. Such serfs could, like others, file a complaint with the local administration against their landowner and in the case of success gained almost complete freedom.

Some scholars present the institution of serfdom in the eighteenth century as almost analogous to American slavery, pointing out that the landlords had full power. This is a controversial position, since all legal norms regarding peasants, regardless of their status, point to the protection of their movable property, honor, and religion, while retaining the opportunity for them to personally represent their interests in court. However, landlords could actually personally punish their peasants and some abused this.

The official estimate is that 23 million Russians were privately owned, 23 million were considered personally free and another 3.5 million peasants were under the Tsar's patronage (udelnye krestiane) before the Great Emancipation of 1861. Unlike serfs, state peasants and peasants under tsar's patronage were considered personally free, nobody had the right to sell them, to interfere in their family life, by law they were considered as 'free agricultural inhabitants' (Russ 'свободные сельские обыватели') One particular source of indignation in Europe was Kolokol published in London, England (1857–65) and Geneva (1865–67). It collected many cases of horrendous physical, emotional and sexual abuse of the serfs by the landowners.

=== Eighteenth and nineteenth centuries ===
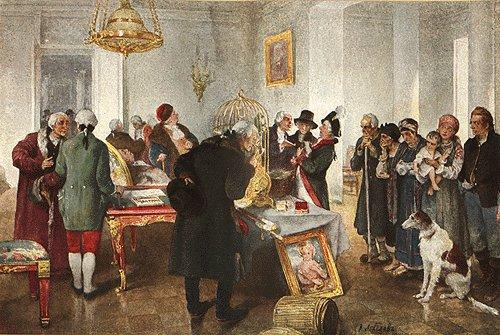
Selling serfs at an auction, Klavdy Lebedev

Edicts of 1718, 1734, 1750, 1761, and 1767 obliged landlords to feed their peasants in times of crop failure and famine and to prevent their impoverishment. Since 1722 landlords were responsible for the correct payment of the per capita tax by their peasants (the tax was collected from the peasants and paid to the treasury by the landlord himself or his clerk). It was forbidden to put peasants on torture for their master's debts. In order to suppress fraudulent practices of landlords, who during audits recorded persons who did not belong to serfs, allegedly with their consent, decrees of 1775, 1781 and 1783 prohibited voluntary registration of serfs. The legislation stipulated conditions that allowed peasants to leave the serf state. Edicts of 1737, 1743, 1744, 1745, 1770, and 1773 declared free those who returned from captivity, as well as foreigners who accepted Eastern Orthodoxy. The children of foster homes and those who had graduated from the St. Petersburg Academy of Arts could not be enserfed. Freedom was granted to retired soldiers who were serfs. Peter III created two measures in 1762 that influenced the abolition of serfdom. He ended mandatory military service for nobles with the abolition of compulsory noble state service. This provided a rationale to end serfdom. Second, was the secularization of the church estates, which transferred its peasants and land to state jurisdiction. In 1775 measures were taken by Catherine II to prosecute estate owners for the cruel treatment of serfs. These measures were strengthened in 1817 and the late 1820s. There were even laws that required estate owners to help serfs in time of famine, which included grain to be kept in reserve. These policies failed to aid famines in the early nineteenth century due to estate owner negligence.

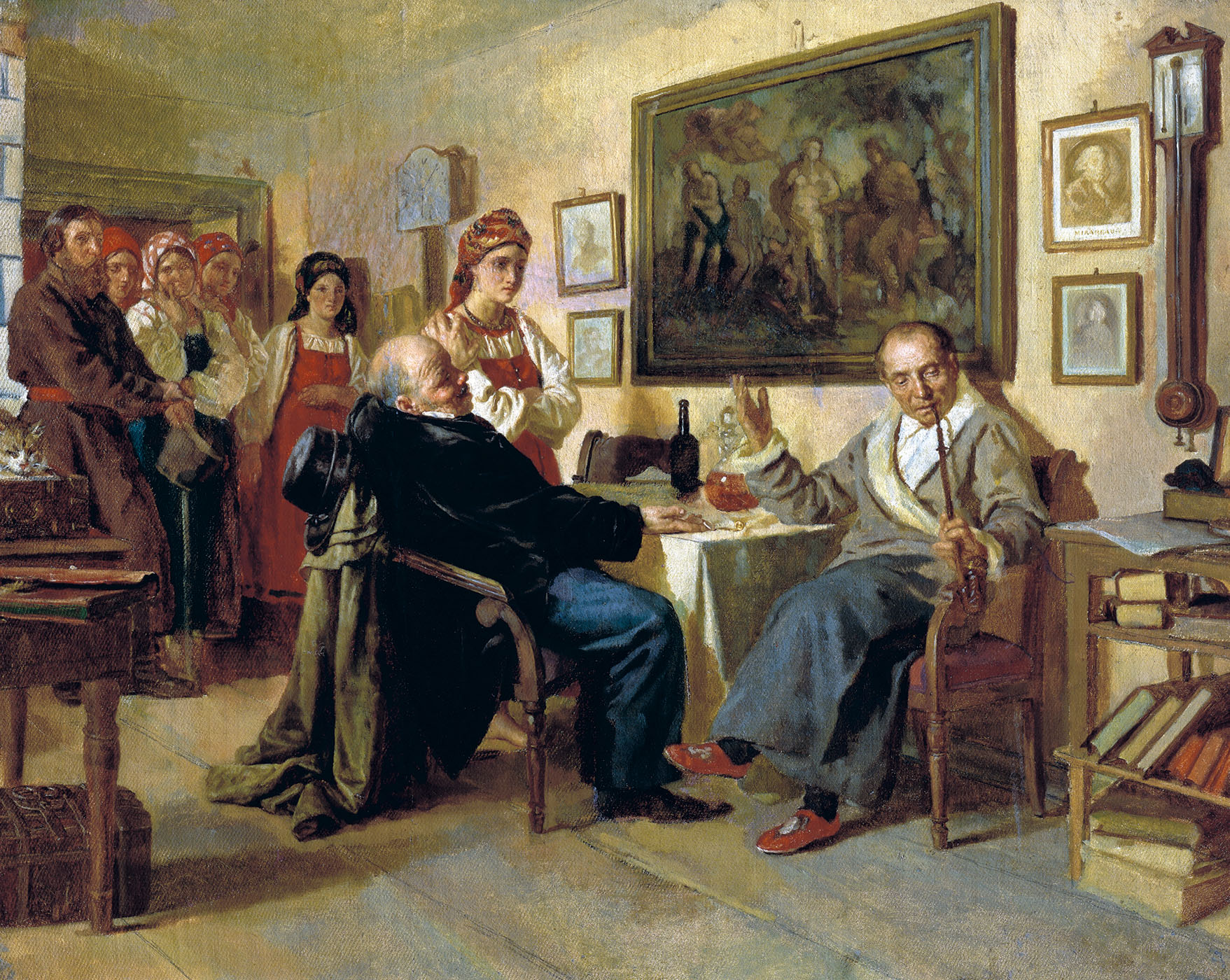
The Bargain by Nikolai Nevrev (Sale of a serf girl)

As the ideas of Enlightenment and humanism spread among the Russian nobility at the turn of the 18th and 19th centuries, a conviction developed that the system of serfdom was flawed and hindered economic development and urban growth. Tsar Alexander I and his advisors quietly discussed the options at length. Obstacles included the failure of abolition in Austria and the political reaction against the French Revolution. Cautiously, he freed peasants from Estonia and Latvia and extended the right to own land to most classes of subjects, including state-owned peasants, in 1801 and created a new social category of "free agriculturalist", for peasants voluntarily emancipated by their masters, in 1803. The great majority of serfs were not affected (under this decree by 1858 152,000 male souls, or 1.5 percent of serfs, had been bought out to freedom). Alexander I forbade to advertise the sale of serfs without land (1801), to sell peasants at fairs (1808), cancelled the right of landlords to exile peasants to katorga ('hard labour'); 1807) and to settle them in Siberia (1809). In 1818 Alexander I gave secret instructions to 12 dignitaries to develop projects to abolish serfdom (among the authors of the projects were A. A. Arakcheev, P. A. Vyazemsky, V. N. Karazin, P. D. Kiselyov, N. S. Mordvinov, N. G. Repnin). All these projects were united by the principle of gradual emancipation of peasants without infringement of economic interests of landlords. However, in 1822–23, due to changes in the domestic political course, Alexander I again forbade serfs to complain to the authorities about the cruelty of their masters, to bring lawsuits for emancipation, and also restored the right of landlords to exile peasants to Siberia at their discretion.

The Russian state also continued to support serfdom due to military conscription. The conscripted serfs dramatically increased the size of the Russian military during the war with Napoleon. With a larger military Russia achieved victory in the Napoleonic Wars and Russo-Persian Wars; this did not change the disparity between Russia and Western Europe, who were experiencing agricultural and industrial revolutions. Compared to Western Europe it was clear that Russia was at an economic disadvantage. European philosophers during the Age of Enlightenment criticized serfdom and compared it to medieval labor practices which were almost non-existent in the rest of the continent. Most Russian nobles were not interested in change toward western labor practices that Catherine the Great proposed. Instead they preferred to mortgage serfs for profit. In 1820, 20% of all serfs were mortgaged to state credit institutions by their owners. This was increased to 66% in 1859.

Although Napoleon had abolished serfdom in other conquered territories, he did not do so in Russia. Dutch general in French service Anthony Boldewijn Gijsbert van Dedem stated on this matter, namely, that Napoleon's lack of desire to abolish serfdom stemmed from his "loss of pro-populace views." Dedem emphasized that Napoleon was "no longer General Bonaparte; strengthening monarchism in France was too important to him, and it was difficult for him to preach revolution in Russia." The French General Comte de Ségur wrote similar: "Napoleon's nature drew him more to the interests of kings than to the people." Napoleon even helped the Vitebsk Russian landowners (in occupied White Ruthenia) suppress the civil unrest and provided them with his soldiers for protection, in order to prevent civil war. Quartermaster of occupied White Ruthenia Amédée-David de Pastoret wrote: "The country was in the most extreme disorder, spread by the uprising of peasants convinced that the freedom in question consisted precisely in unbridled arbitrariness." Ségur believed that Napoleon rejected proposals to abolish serfdom because "a barbarian people has barbaric freedom, unbridled freedom, terrible licentiousness!" Probably, the experience of the Peninsular War convinced Napoleon of the danger of a popular movement, when anti-feudal tasks were intertwined with national liberation ones. Statements from the campaign's participants indicate that Napoleon was repelled by the idea of liberating the peasants precisely because of the "lawlessness of a peasant revolt," which possessed only mindless destructive power (including mass robberies) and was incapable of anything constructive. Napoleon understood that any war must end in peace, but he would not have been able to make one with anyone if chaos and anarchy reigned in Russia. He needed to negotiate with Russia to enforce the Continental System again (Russia "began to forget" about the Treaties of Tilsit), which Alexander I violated, which was the reason for the war. The system worked poorly overall and had a negative impact on Russia's economy and the economies of other member countries of the system. In indigenous Russia (starting from the Smolensk Governorate and ending with Central Russia), the peasants did not accept (mainly) the "invader Napoleon" and supported their own Russian government. In Lithuania, White Ruthenia and Courland lands, the population was rather neutral. On both sides, propaganda also played a role in the mood of the named regions, inclusive of indigenous Russia: on the Russian side, it was religious–national, on the French side, it was anti-feudal; French propaganda was carried out at a local provocative level, but not at the highest, political scale. The Russian peasantry was traditionally very religious and strongly devoted to the Russian throne. According to the Soviet historian Troitsky, Napoleon correctly assessed the slave-like status of the peasantry, underestimated its spiritual and moral strength. It was not enough to free the peasants, they also needed to be educated; but peasants had to plow, so taking them away from their work any further was undesirable for the landowners. Having gained "enlightenment", the peasants could become a source of unrest, demanding their freedom. At the same time, Napoleon's emancipation attempt of poorly educated peasants led to chaos. Such was the dilemma facing Emperor of the French and Emperors of Russia. And so the 1861 reform was, in itself, cautious; it had no immediate effect.

To discuss the peasant question, Nicholas I successively created 9 secret committees, issued about 100 decrees aimed at mitigating serfdom, but did not affect its foundations. From 1833 it was not allowed to sell serfs at public auction "with the splitting of families", "to satisfy public and private debts", paying for them with serfs with their detachment from the land, as well as to transfer peasants into household serfs, taking away their plots. The right of landlords to exile peasants to Siberia at their discretion was restricted (1828). A decree on obliged peasants was issued (1842), according to which landlords could let their peasants go free, but peasants' plots were transferred not into ownership, but into the use of peasants, for which they had to perform duties in favour of the landlord. The landlords were given the right to let the peasants go free by mutual agreement with them (1844). The peasants of the landlord's estates sold at auction for the owner's debts were allowed to buy out at will (1847; in 1848–52 964 male peasants used the right). Emperor Nicholas I also banned the trade of African slaves in 1842, though there were almost no Russians who participated in it.

Bourgeois were allowed to own serfs 1721–62 and 1798–1816; this was to encourage industrialisation. In 1804, 48% of Russian factory workers were serfs, 52% in 1825. Landless serfs rose from 4.14% in 1835 to 6.79% in 1858. They received no land in the emancipation. Landlords deliberately increased the number of domestic serfs when they anticipated serfdom's demise. In 1798, Ukrainian landlords were banned from selling serfs apart from land. In 1841, landless nobles were banned also.

==== Poland–Lithuania ====
According to certain Polish sources, increasingly in the 18th century Russian peasants were escaping from Russia to the Polish–Lithuanian Commonwealth (where once harsh serfdom conditions were improving) in significant enough numbers to become a major concern for the Russian Government and sufficient to play a role in its decision to partition the Commonwealth (one of the reasons Catherine II gave for the partition of Poland was that thousands of peasants escaped from Russia to Poland to seek a better fate). Jerzy Czajewski and Piotr Kimla wrote that until the partitions solved this problem, Russian armies raided territories of the Commonwealth, officially to recover the escapees, but in fact kidnapping many locals.

==== Abolition ====
A 1907 painting by Boris Kustodiev depicting Russian serfs listening to the proclamation of the Emancipation Manifesto in 1861

In 1816, 1817, and 1819, serfdom was abolished in Estland, Courland, and Livonia respectively. However all the land stayed in noble hands and labor rent lasted until 1868. It was replaced with landless laborers and sharecropping (halbkörner). Landless workers had to ask permission to leave an estate.

The nobility was too weak to oppose the emancipation of the serfs. In 1820, a fifth of the serfs were mortgaged, half by 1842. By 1859, a third of noble's estates and two thirds of their serfs were mortgaged to noble banks or the state. The nobility was also weakened by the scattering of their estates, lack of primogeniture, and the high turnover and mobility from estate to estate.

The Tsar's aunt Grand Duchess Elena Pavlovna played a powerful role backstage in the years 1855 to 1861. Using her close relationship with her nephew Alexander II, she supported and guided his desire for emancipation, and helped mobilize the support of key advisors.

In 1861, Alexander II freed all serfs (except in Georgia and Kalmykia) in a major agrarian reform, stimulated in part by his view that "it is better to liberate the peasants from above" than to wait until they won their freedom by rising "from below". Between 1864 and 1871 serfdom was abolished in Georgia. In Kalmykia, serfdom was not abolished until 1892.

Serfdom was abolished, but not always on favorable terms to the peasants. Even after emancipation, feudal agriculture practices continued. Most former serfs had to pay a land redemption fee (redemption payments were not abolished until 1907), and could only purchase less fertile, less profitable plots of land that weren't necessarily contiguous. Peasants often had to pay more than the market price for land, with the percentage varying by location. 90% of the serfs who got larger plots were in Congress Poland, where the Tsar wanted to weaken the szlachta. Many peasants remained indebted and bound to landowners. Nobility didn't lose their privileges.

=== Impact ===
A 2018 study in the American Economic Review found "substantial increases in agricultural productivity, industrial output, and peasants' nutrition in Imperial Russia as a result of the abolition of serfdom in 1861".

== Serf society ==
=== Labour and obligations ===
In Russian, the terms barshchina (барщина) or boyarshchina (боярщина) refer to the obligatory work that the serfs performed for the landowner on his portion of the land (the other part of the land, usually of a poorer quality, the peasants could use for themselves). Sometimes the terms are loosely translated by the term corvée. While no official government regulation to the extent of barshchina existed, a 1797 ukase by Paul I of Russia described a barshchina of three days a week as normal and sufficient for the landowner's needs.

In the black-earth region, 70% to 77% of the serfs performed barshchina; the rest paid a quit-rent (obrok (Russian: оброк)).

=== Marriage and family life ===
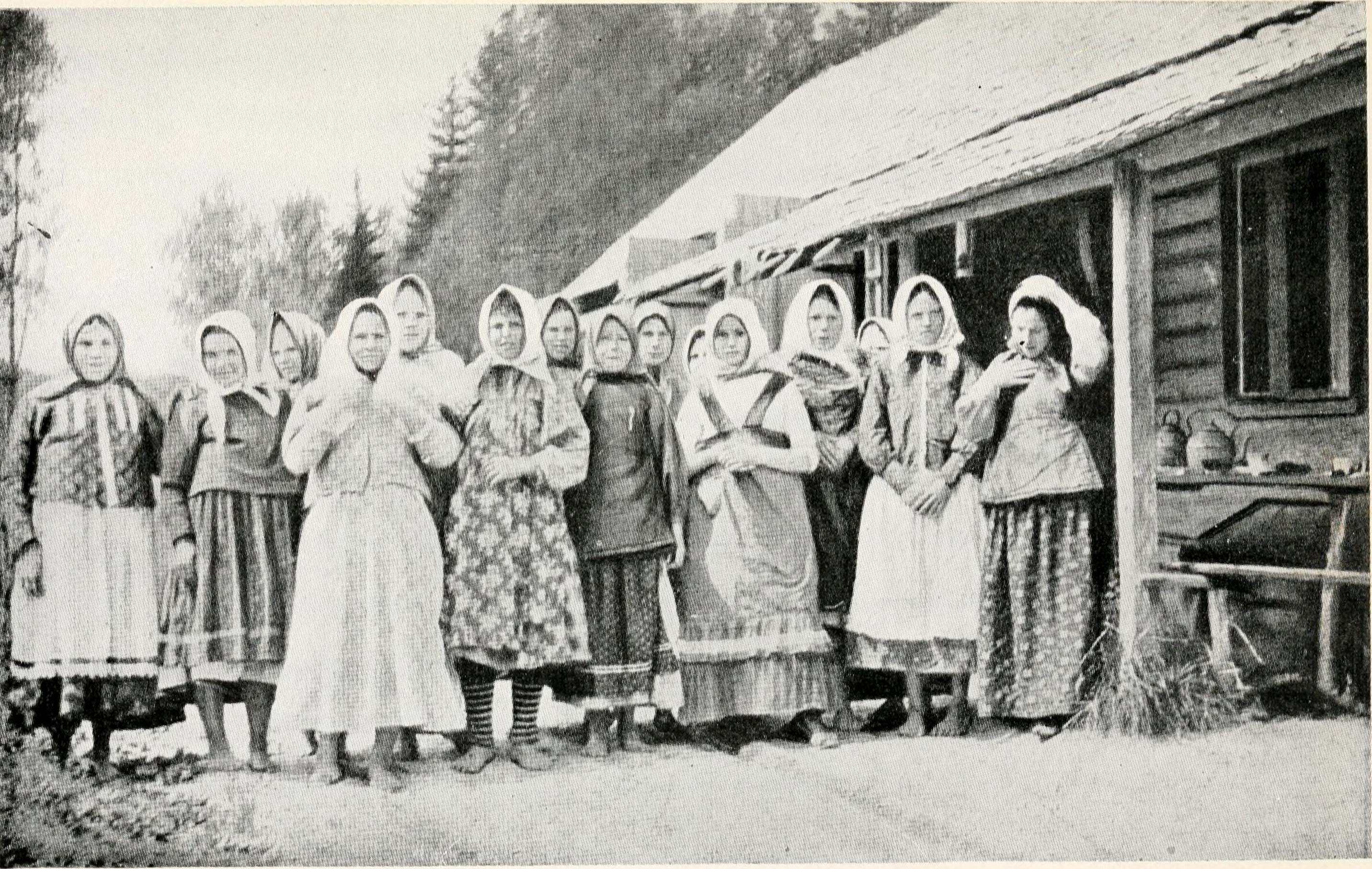
Group of Russian peasant women

The Russian Orthodox Church had many rules regarding marriage that were strictly observed by the population. For example, marriage was not allowed to take place during times of fasting, the eve or day of a holiday, during the entire week of Easter, or for two weeks after Christmas. Before the abolition of serfdom in 1861, marriage was strictly prohibited on Tuesdays, Thursdays, and Saturdays. Because of these firm rules most marriages occurred in the months of January, February, October, and November. After the emancipation the most popular marrying months were July, October, and November.

Imperial laws were very particular with the age in which serfs could marry. The minimum age to marry was 13 years old for women, and 15 for men. After 1830 the female and male ages were raised to 16 and 18 respectively. To marry over the age of 60, the serf had to receive permission, but marriage over the age of 80 was forbidden. The Church also did not approve marriages with large age differences.

Landowners were interested in keeping all of their serfs and not losing workers to marriages on other estates. Prior to 1812 serfs were not allowed to marry serfs from other estates. After 1812 the rules relaxed slightly, but in order for a family to give their daughter to a husband in another estate they had to apply and present information to their landowner ahead of time. If a serf wanted to marry a widow, then emancipation and death certificates were to be handed over and investigated for authenticity by their owner before a marriage could take place.

Before and after the abolition of serfdom, Russian peasant families were patriarchal. Marriage was important for families economically and socially. Parents were in charge of finding suitable spouses for their children in order to help the family. The bride's parents were concerned with the social and material benefits they would gain in the alliance between the two families. Some also took into consideration their daughter's future quality of life and how much work would be required of her. The groom's parents would be concerned about economical factors such as the size of the dowry as well as the bride's decency, modesty, obedience, ability to do work, and family background. Upon marriage, the bride came to live with her new husband and his family, so she needed to be ready to assimilate and work hard.

Serfs looked highly upon early marriage because of increased parental control. At a younger age there is less chance of the individual falling in love with someone other than whom his or her parents chose. There is also increased assurance of chastity, which was more important for women than men. The average age of marriage for women was around 19 years old.

During serfdom, when the head of the house was being disobeyed by their children they could have the master or landowner step in. After the emancipation of serfs in 1861, the household patriarch lost some of his power, and could no longer receive the landowner's help. The younger generations now had the freedom to work off their estates; some even went to work in factories. These younger peasants had access to newspapers and books, which introduced them to more radical ways of thinking. The ability to work outside of the household gave the younger peasants independence as well as a wage to do with what they wanted. Agricultural and domestic jobs were a group effort, so the wage went to the family. The children who worked industrial jobs gave their earnings to their family as well, but some used it as a way to gain a say in their own marriages. In this case some families allowed their sons to marry whom they chose as long as the family was in similar economic standing as their own. No matter what, parental approval was required in order to make a marriage legal.

=== Distribution of property and duties between the spouses ===
According to a study completed in the late 1890s by the ethnographer Olga Petrovna Semyonova-Tian-Shanskaia, husband and wife had different duties in the household. In regards to ownership, the husband assumed the property plus any funds required to make additions to the property. Additions included fence, barns, and wagons. While primary purchasing power belonged to the husband, the wife was expected to buy certain items. She was also expected to buy household items such as bowls, plates, pots, barrels and various utensils. Wives were also required to purchase cloth and make clothes for the family by spinning and using a dontse. Footwear was the husband's responsibility—he made bast shoes and felt boots for the family. As for crops, it was expected for men to sow and women to harvest. A common crop harvested by serfs in the Black Earth Region was flax. Husbands owned most of the livestock, such as pigs and horses. Cows were the property of the husband, but were usually in the wife's possession. Chickens were considered to be the wife's property, while sheep was common property for the family. The exception was when the wife owned sheep through a dowry (sobinki).

=== Material culture ===
Typical Russian serf clothing included the zipun (Russian: зипун, a collarless kaftan) and the smock.

A 19th-century report noted: "Every Russian peasant, male and female, wears cotton clothes. The men wear printed shirts and trousers, and the women are dressed from head to foot in printed cotton also."

== The extent of serfdom in Russia ==
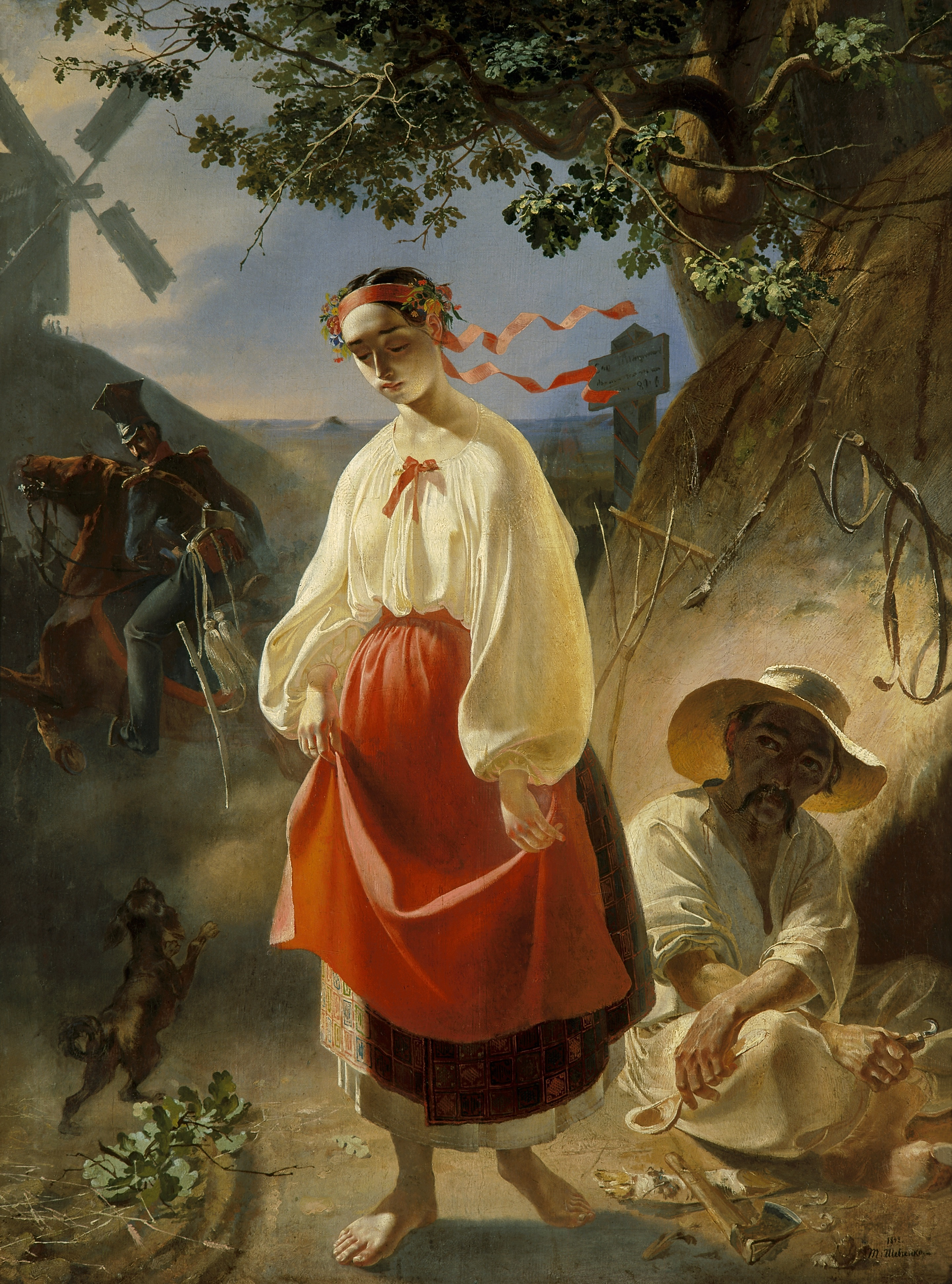
Kateryna, painting of a Ukrainian serf girl by Taras Shevchenko, who was himself born a serf

By the mid-19th century, peasants composed a plurality of the population, and according to the census of 1857, the number of private serfs was 23.1 million out of 62.5 million citizens of the Russian empire, 37.7% of the population.

The exact numbers, according to official data, were: entire population 60909309; peasantry of all classes 49486665; state peasants 23138191; peasants on the lands of proprietors 23022390; peasants of the appanages and other departments 3326084. State peasants were considered personally free, but their freedom of movement was restricted.

% serfs on estates
Estate of	1700	1861
>500 serfs	26	42
100–500	33	38
1–100	41	20

% masters with <100 serfs
1777	1834	1858
83	84	78

Russian serfdom depended entirely on the traditional and extensive technology of the peasantry. Yields remained low and stationary throughout most of the 19th century. Any increase in income drawn from agriculture was largely through increasing land area and extensive grain raising by means of exploitation of the peasant labor, that is, by burdening the peasant household still further.

Serfs owned by European Russian landlords
No. of serfs	in 1777 (%)	in 1859 (%)
>1000		1.1
501–1000		2
101–500	16 (>100)	18
21–100	25	35.1
0–20	59	43.8

% peasants enserfed in each province, 1860

>55%: Kaluga Kyiv Kostroma Kutais Minsk Mogilev Nizhny Novgorod Podolia Ryazan Smolensk Tula Vitebsk Vladimir Volhynia Yaroslavl

36–55%: Chernigov Grodno Kovno Kursk Moscow Novgorod Oryol Penza Poltava Pskov Saratov Simbirsk Tambov Tver Vilna

16–35%: Don Ekaterinoslav Kharkov Kherson Kuban Perm Tiflis Vologda Voronezh

In the Central Black Earth Region 70–77% of the serfs performed labour services (barshchina), the rest paid quit rent (obrok). Owing to the high fertility, 70% of Russian cereal production in the 1850s was here. In the seven central provinces, 1860, 67.7% of the serfs were on obrok.

In literature, Russian serfdom provided both a backdrop and a source of dramatic tension for the works of prominent authors like Leo Tolstoy and Fyodor Dostoevsky. Characters drawn from the serf population were portrayed with profound emotional depth, their stories shedding light on the harsh realities of serfdom. These narratives served to amplify calls for social reform and underscored the deep inequalities of the Russian societal structure.

The influence of serfdom was also notable in Russian music and art. Folk songs and dances, often performed by serfs, contributed significantly to Russia's unique cultural tradition. At the same time, works of art often depicted serfs and their lives, either romanticizing their existence or highlighting the cruelty of the serf system.

== See also ==
- Slavery in Russia
- Anna Orlova-Tshesmenskaja
- Darya Nikolayevna Saltykova
- Dead Souls, a novel which focuses on late serfdom
- Fugitive peasants
- Government reforms of Alexander II of Russia
- History of serfdom
- Kholop
- Lord and Peasant in Russia from the Ninth to the Nineteenth Century
- Manifesto of three-day corvee (1797)
- Obshchina
- Smerd
