= Otto Chan =

British radiologist and whistleblower

Dr. Otto Chan is a consultant radiologist, married and a father of 7 children. He is known as the whistleblower on several issues that related to patient safety, training issues in radiology. He also blew the whistle on terms of employment for flexible trainees. He is also the editor of a book, ABC of Emergency Radiology and co-editor of Ultrasound in Emergency Care.

He was sacked for alleged gross misconduct on 7 June 2006 by The Barts and The London NHS Trust who run the Royal London Hospital.

One of the main issues that led to him blowing the whistle was the thousands of X-ray films and scans that were left lying around, lined up in a London hospital's dirty corridor and stayed that way unchecked for years. They belonged to more than 100,000 patients. As a result of this being brought to attention the senior doctor who revealed the scandal, namely Dr Otto Chan had been sacked.

Some of the 15,000 packets of films and scans were kept in the corridors because the hospital lacked the money and means to analyse them all. It is estimated that only half of the films and scans were ever seen by a specialist. This meant that thousands of patients and their doctors will never know whether or not their images showed any signs of disease.

In 2002, the packages of films were locked away in a storeroom shortly before an official inspection visit. On other occasions, patients' x-ray films were hidden or rather locked in the car boots of consultants because they were so worried they would go missing.

== Reaction to Dr Chan's claims ==
It was reported in the East London Advertiser on 28 November 2009 that the Barts & London trust former Head of Training and Clinical Director of Radiology Professor Peter Armstrong said that Dr Chan claiming trainees were unhappy was "pure fantasy". Angus Moon QC, who was representing the trust, said that Dr Chan's disclosure wasn't bonafide but he was stirring up trouble and it was a campaign to stir up as much trouble as possible for the trust.

== Home burgled ==
In 2007 Dr Chan's home was burgled and due to what he believed to be lack of assistance from the police, he attempted to recover his own property and was threatened by the police for attempting to buy stolen goods even though he believed the goods to be his own.

The police said that he had breached the Theft Act by promising in the posters that there would be no questions asked if the property was returned.

== Publications ==
- ABC of Emergency Radiology - Otto Chan - ISBN 978-0-7279-1528-3 - (Paperback - Jul 2007)
- Ultrasound in Emergency Care - 2004 - Adam Brooks, Jim Connolly, Otto Chan - Print ISBN 978-0-7279-1731-7

== Links & Further reading ==
- NHS Behind the headlines Dr Otto Chan the whistleblower
- British Chinese Online Discussion Board Dr Otto Chan
- Rising star becomes embroiled in protracted whistleblower dispute
- Dr Rant, Dr Otto Chan (with comments)
- NHS whistleblower 'sacked for revealing dumped x-ray scans'
