= History of serfdom =

Serfdom is a social class in a feudal system, by which an agricultural laborer is bound to work under their lord's estate, and may not leave. This practice, while most prevalent in Medieval Europe has a long history that dates back to the beginnings of human civilization, with helots in the ancient Greek city-state of Sparta, and coloni in the Roman Empire. It persisted and grew through the 13th Century, before beginning to decline during the 14th-16th centuries, due to a growing economy, powerful monarchs, changes in population, and growing numbers of rebellions.

== Origins ==
Social institutions similar to serfdom occurred in the ancient world. The status of the helots in the ancient Greek city-state of Sparta resembled that of medieval serfs. By the 3rd century AD, the Roman Empire faced a labour shortage. Large Roman landowners increasingly relied on Roman freemen, acting as tenant farmers, (instead of on slaves) to provide labour. The status of these tenant farmers, eventually known as coloni, steadily eroded. Because the tax system implemented by Diocletian (reigned 284–305) assessed taxes based both on land and on the inhabitants of that land, it became administratively inconvenient for peasants to leave the land where the census counted them. In 332 AD Emperor Constantine issued legislation that greatly restricted the rights of the coloni and tied them to the land. Some see these laws as the beginning of medieval serfdom in Europe.

However, medieval serfdom really began with the breakup of the Carolingian Empire around the 10th century. The demise of this empire, which had ruled much of western Europe for more than 200 years, ushered in a long period during which no strong central government existed in most of Europe. During this period, powerful feudal lords encouraged the establishment of serfdom as a source of agricultural labor. Serfdom, indeed, was an institution that reflected a fairly common practice whereby great landlords ensured that others worked to feed them and were held down, legally and economically, while doing so.

== Prevalence ==
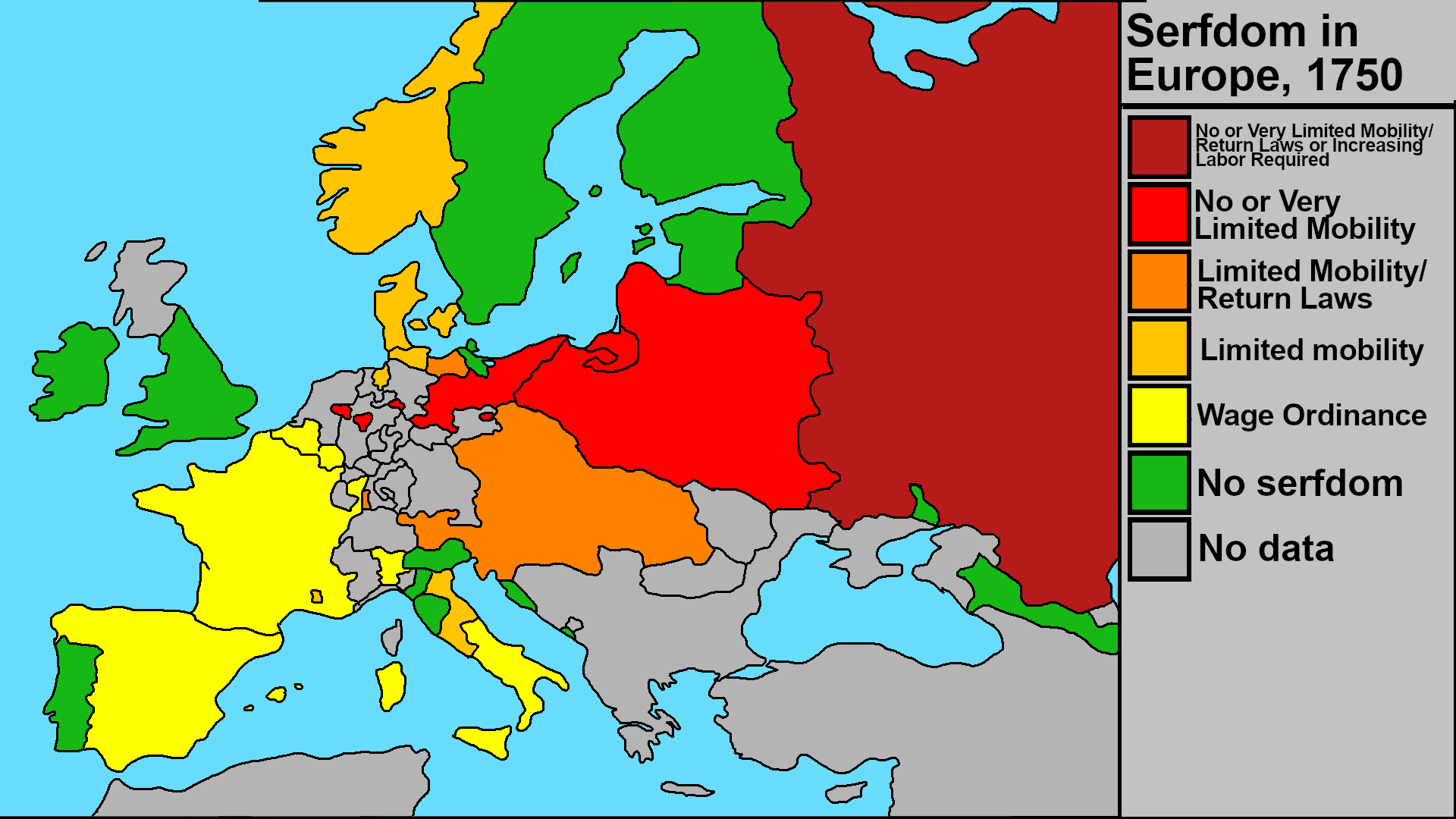
Serfdom in Europe, 1750

Serfdom as a system provided most of the agricultural labour throughout the Middle Ages. Slavery persisted right through the Middle Ages, but it was rare, diminishing and largely confined to the use of household slaves, as well as galley slaves. Parts of Europe, including much of Scandinavia, never adopted serfdom.

In the later Middle Ages serfdom began to disappear west of the Rhine even as it spread through much of the rest of Europe. The rise of powerful monarchs, towns, and an improving economy weakened the manorial system through the 13th and 14th centuries; serfdom had become rare by 1400.

Serfdom in Western Europe declined in the 14th and 15th centuries, partially because of a drop in population. Landowners were forced to improve conditions in order to attract workers. It further declined into the 16th century because of changes in the economy, population, and laws governing lord-tenant relations in Western European nations. The enclosure of manor fields for livestock grazing and for larger arable plots made the economy of serfs' small strips of land in open fields less attractive to landowners. Furthermore, the increasing use of money made tenant farming by serfs less profitable; for much less than it cost to support a serf, a lord could now hire workers who were more skilled and pay them in cash. Paid labour was also more flexible, since workers could be hired only when they were needed.

At the same time, increasing unrest and uprisings by serfs and peasants, like Tyler's Rebellion in England in 1381, put pressure on the nobility and the clergy to reform the system. As a result, the gradual establishment of new forms of land leases and increased personal liberties accommodated serf and peasant demands to some extent.

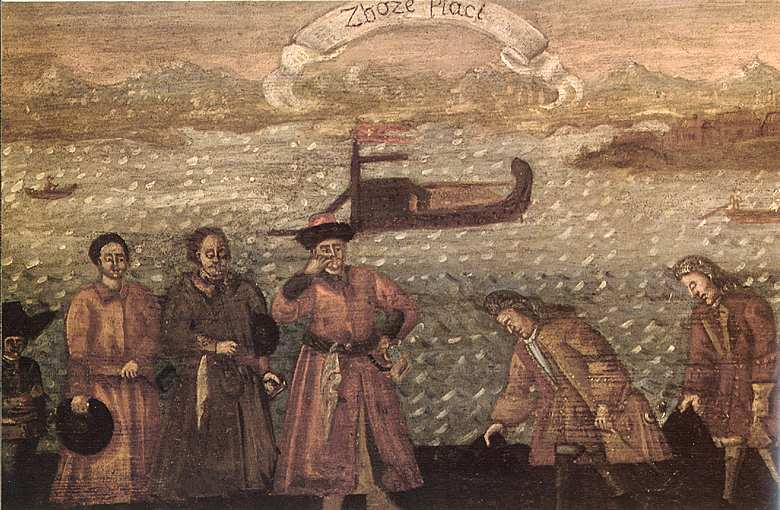
Grain pays

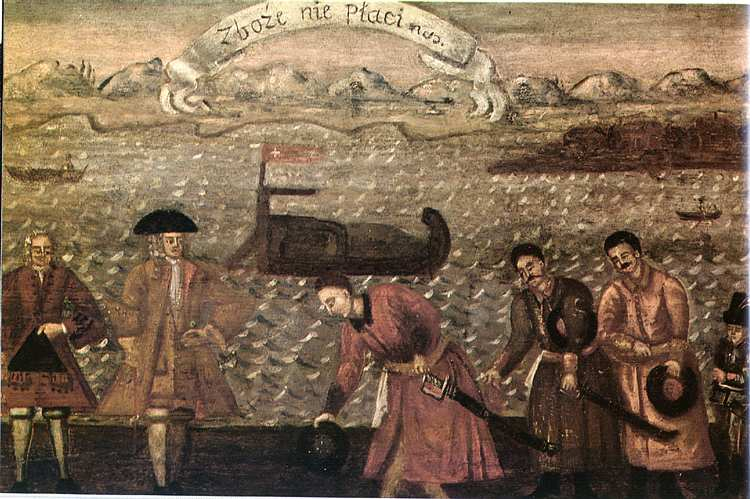
Grain doesn't pay.

Those two pictures illustrate the notion that agriculture, once extremely profitable to the nobles (szlachta) in the Polish–Lithuanian Commonwealth, became much less profitable from the second half of seventeenth century onwards

Serfdom reached Eastern Europe centuries later than Western Europe—it became dominant around the 15th century. Before that time, Eastern Europe had been much more sparsely populated than Western Europe, and the lords of Eastern Europe created a peasantry-friendly environment to encourage migration east. Serfdom developed in Eastern Europe after the Black Death epidemics of the mid-14th century, which stopped the eastward migration. The resulting high land-to-labour ratio - combined with Eastern Europe's vast, sparsely populated areas - gave the lords an incentive to bind the remaining peasantry to their land. Whereas in Western Europe, where landlords hoped to keep peasants in one area by improving conditions, lords in Eastern Europe did this by increasing obligations such as labor dues. Throughout the course of the 15th century, Eastern European peasants' ability to move at will decreased dramatically. With increased demand for agricultural produce in Western Europe during the later era when Western Europe limited and eventually abolished serfdom, serfdom remained in force throughout Eastern Europe during the 17th century so that nobility-owned estates could produce more agricultural products (especially grain) for the profitable export market.

According to Jerome Blum, the rise of serfdom in Eastern Europe in the 15th century, just as serfdom disappeared in Western Europe, is due to the increasing political influence and economic privileges of the nobles in the government, and reduced competition for labour from cities. The increase in the political and economic power of the nobility was caused by the need for noble support from monarchs. In order to gain noble support, monarchs increased nobles' freedom over their peasants, allowing them to increase obligations at will. The cities declined due to the collapse of the Hanseatic League's and Teutonic Order's trade networks and trade disruptions from war. Eastern European nobles started trading directly with the English and Dutch merchants, bypassing the trading cities.

This pattern applied in Central and Eastern European countries, including Prussia (Prussian Ordinances of 1525), Austria, Hungary (laws of the late 15th and early 16th centuries), the Polish–Lithuanian Commonwealth (szlachta privileges of the early 16th century) and the Russian Tsardom (laws of the late 16th and first half of the 17th century). This also led to the slower industrial development and urbanisation of those regions. Generally, this process, referred to as "second serfdom" or "export-led serfdom", persisted until the mid-19th century and became very repressive and substantially limited serfs' rights. Before the 1861 abolition of serfdom in Russia, a landowner's estate was often measured by the number of "souls" he owned, a practice made famous by Gogol's 1842 novel Dead Souls.

Many of these countries abolished serfdom during the Napoleonic invasions of the early 19th century. Serfdom remained in force in most of Russia until the Emancipation reform of 1861, enacted on 19 February 1861, though in the Russian-controlled Baltic provinces it had been abolished at the beginning of the 19th century. According to the Russian census of 1857, Russia had 23.1 million private serfs. Russian serfdom was perhaps the most notable Eastern European institution, as it was never influenced by German law and migrations, and serfdom and the manorial system were enforced by the crown (Tsar), not by the nobility.

== Decline ==
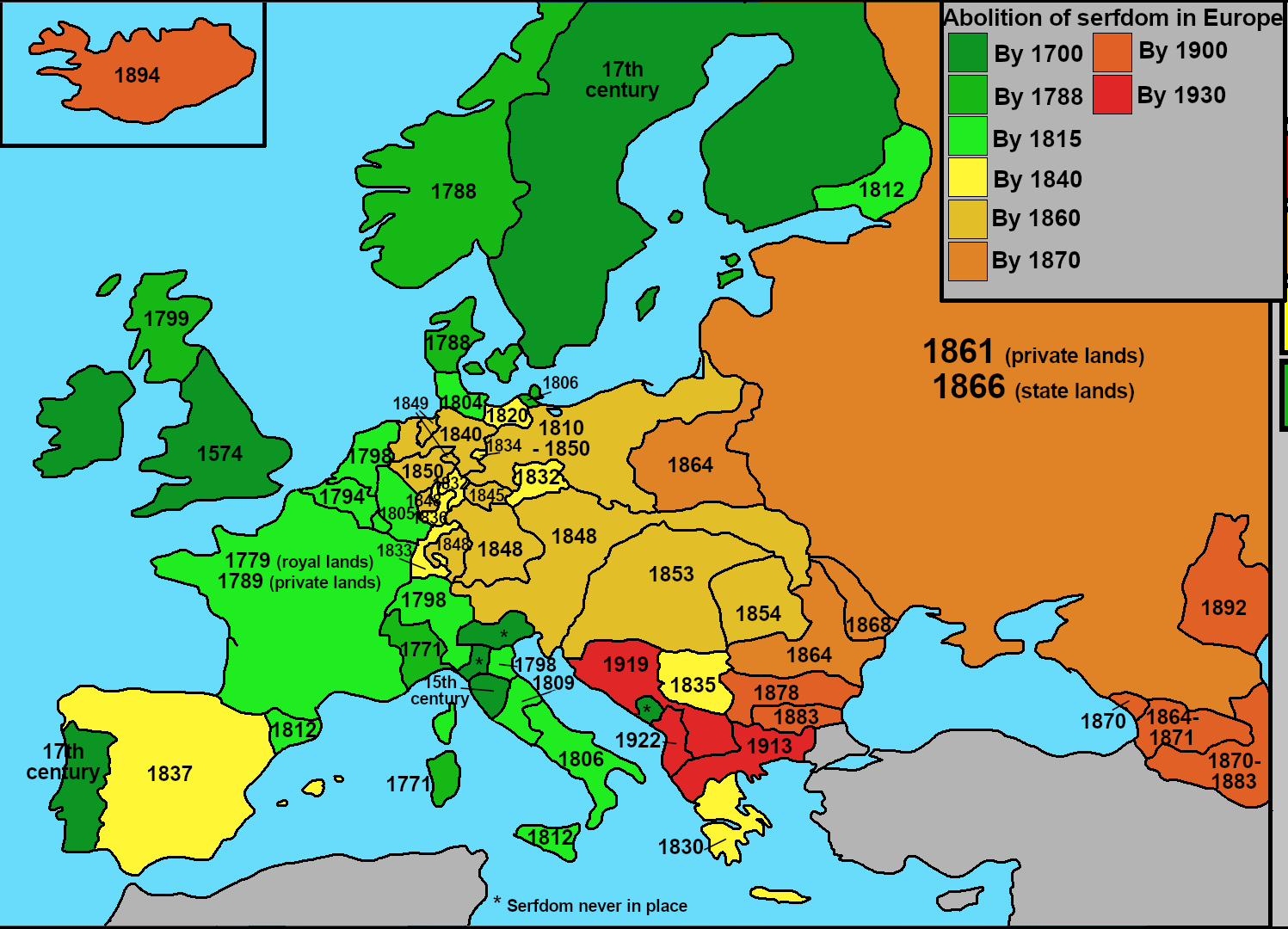
Map of abolition of serfdom in Europe

In Western Europe serfdom became progressively less common through the Middle Ages, particularly after the Black Death reduced the rural population and increased the bargaining power of workers. Furthermore, the lords of many manors were willing (for payment) to manumit ("release") their serfs.

=== Normandy ===
In Normandy, serfdom had disappeared by 1100. Two possible causes of the disappearance of serfdom in Normandy have been proposed: (1) it might have been implemented to attract peasants to a Normandy depopulated by the Viking invasions or (2) it might be a result of the peasants' revolt of 996 in Normandy.

=== Great Britain ===
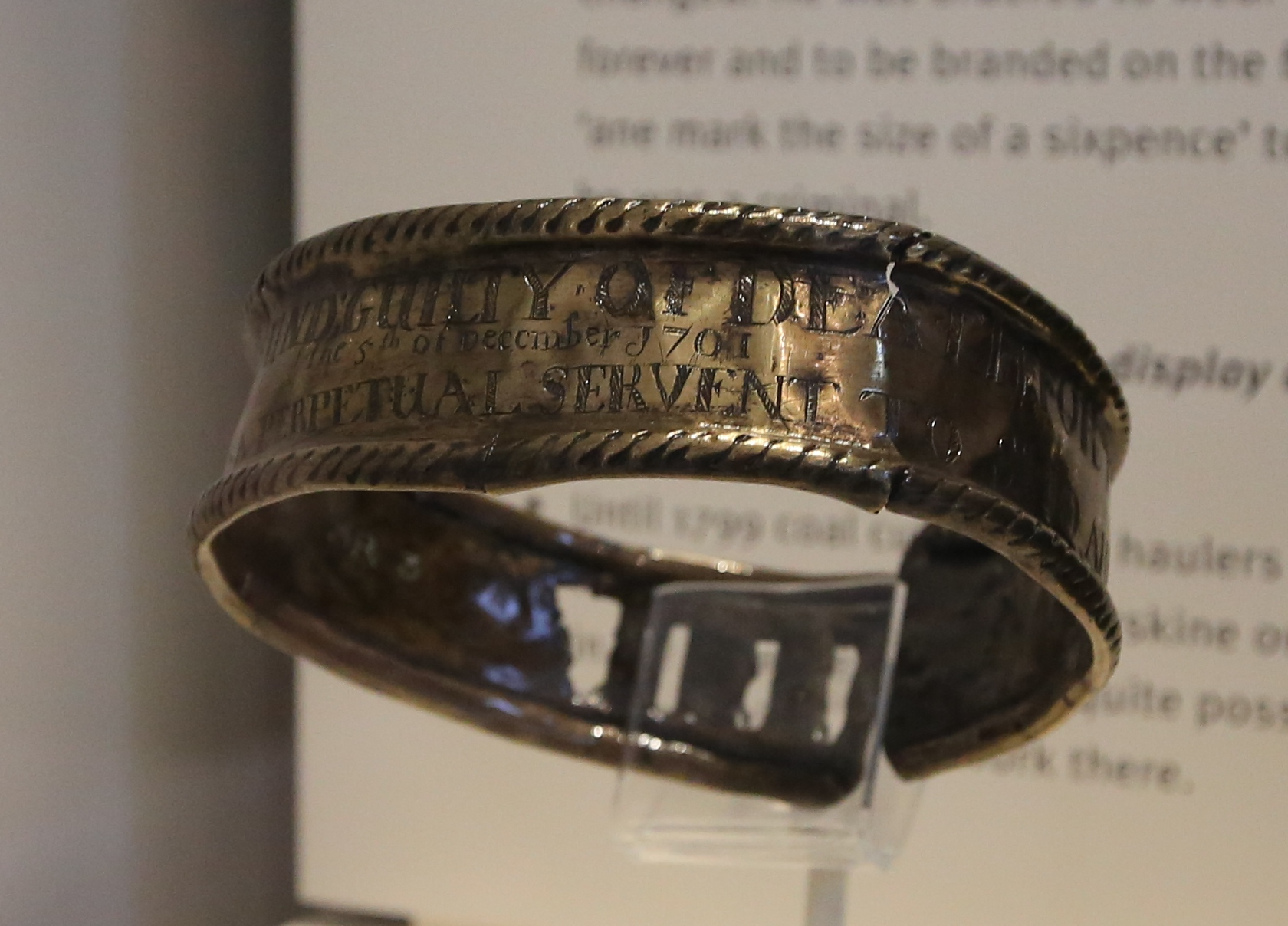
Scottish serf collar from 1701

In England, the end of serfdom began with the Peasants' Revolt in 1381. It had largely died out in England by 1500 as a personal status and was never officially abolished. Land held by serf tenure (unless enfranchised) continued to be held by what was thenceforth known as a copyhold tenancy, which was not completely abolished until 1925 (although it was whittled away during the 19th and early 20th centuries). There were Scottish born serfs until the Colliers and Salters (Scotland) Act 1775 prevented the creation of the status, and 1799, when coal miners who had already been kept in serfdom prior to the 1775 Act gained emancipation. However, most Scottish serfs had already been freed.

=== France ===
Serfdom was de facto ended in France by Philip IV, Louis X (1315), and Philip V (1318). With the exception of a few isolated cases, serfdom had ceased to exist in France by the 15th century. In Early Modern France, French nobles nevertheless maintained a great number of seigneurial privileges over the free peasants that worked lands under their control. Serfdom was formally abolished in France in 1789.

=== Era of the French Revolution ===
The era of the French Revolution (1790s to 1820s) saw serfdom abolished in most of Western and Central Europe, while its practice remained common in Eastern Europe until the middle of the 19th century (1861 in Russia). In France, serfdom had been in decline for at least three centuries by the start of the Revolution, replaced by various forms of freehold tenancy. The last vestiges of serfdom were officially ended on 4 August 1789, with a decree abolishing the feudal rights of the nobility.

It removed the authority of the manorial courts, eliminated tithes and manorial dues, and freed those who still remained bound to the land. However, the decree was mostly symbolic, as widespread peasant revolts had effectively ended the feudal system beforehand; and ownership of the land still remained in the hands of the landlords, who could continue collecting rents and enforcing tenant contracts.

=== Germany ===
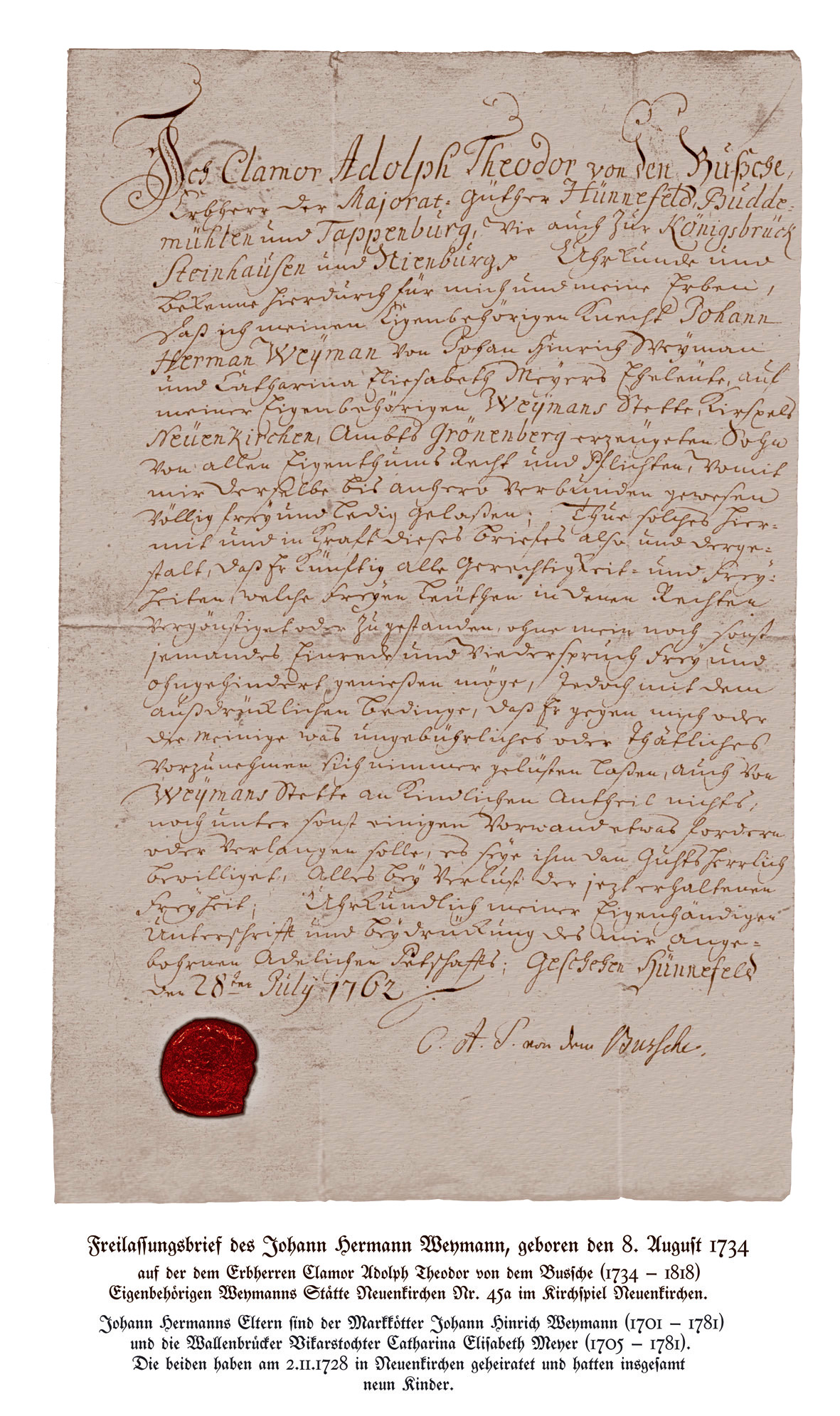
End of serfdom: a German „Freilassungsbrief“ (Letter for the End of a serfdom) from 1762.

In German history the emancipation of the serfs came between 1770 and 1830, with the nobility in Schleswig being the first to agree to do so in 1797, followed by the signing of the royal and political leaders of Denmark and Germany in 1804. Prussia abolished serfdom with the "October Edict" of 1807, which upgraded the personal legal status of the peasantry and gave them ownership of half or two-thirds of the lands they were working. The edict applied to all peasants whose holdings were above a certain size, and included both Crown lands and noble estates. The peasants were freed from the obligation of personal services to the lord and annual dues; in return landowners were given ownership of 1/3 to 1/2 of the land. The peasant owned and rented the lands that were deeded to the old owners. The other German states imitated Prussia after 1815.

In sharp contrast to the violence that characterized land reform in the French Revolution, Germany handled it peacefully. In Schleswig the peasants, who had been influenced by the Enlightenment, played an active role; elsewhere they were largely passive. Indeed, for most peasants, customs and traditions continued largely unchanged, including the old habits of deference to the nobles whose legal authority remained quite strong over the villagers. The old paternalistic relationship in East Prussia lasted into the 20th century. What was new was that the peasant could now sell his land, enabling him to move to the city, or buy up the land of his neighbors.

The land reforms in northwestern Germany were driven by progressive governments and local elites. They abolished feudal obligations and divided collectively owned common land into private parcels and thus created a more efficient market-oriented rural economy. It produced increased productivity and population growth. It strengthened the traditional social order because wealthy peasants obtained most of the former common land, while the rural proletariat was left without land; many left for the cities or America. Meanwhile, the division of the common land served as a buffer preserving social peace between nobles and peasants. East of the Elbe River, the Junker class maintained large estates and monopolized political power.

=== Habsburg monarchy ===
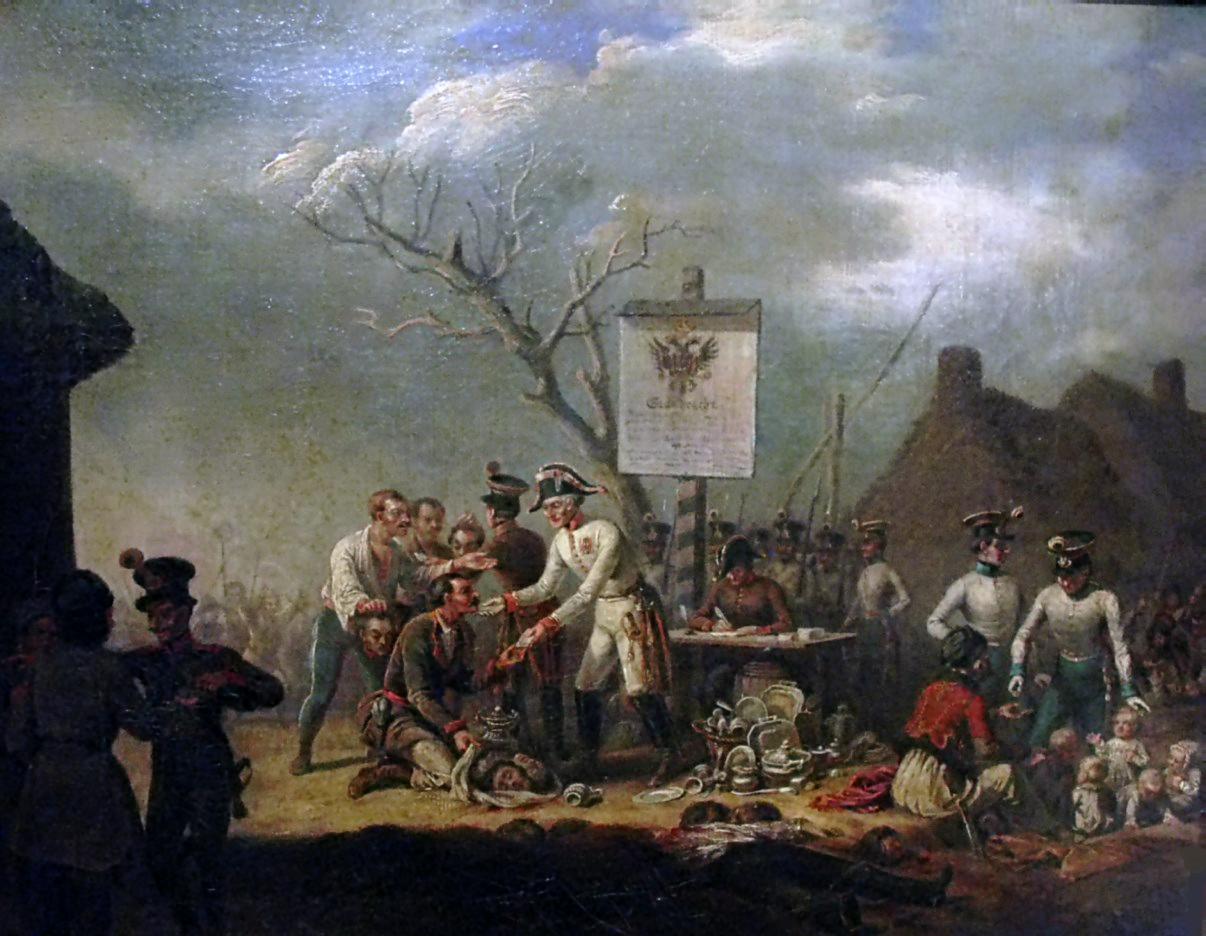
"Galician slaughter" 1846, by Jan Lewicki (1795–1871); "directed against manorial property (for example, the manorial prisons) and rising against serfdom; Galician, mainly Polish, peasants killed over 1000 noblemen and destroyed 500 manors in 1846."

In the Habsburg monarchy, Emperor Joseph II issued the Serfdom Patent that abolished serfdom in the German speaking areas in 1781. In the Kingdom of Hungary, where he was known as Jozef II, he issued a similar decree in 1785 after the Revolt of Horea in Transylvania. These patents converted the legal standings of all serfs into those of free-holders. All feudal restrictions were abolished in 1848 when all the land property were converted to non-feudal, transferable properties, and feudalism was legally abolished.

The eradication of the feudal system marks the beginning of an era of rapid change in Europe. The change in status following the enclosure movements beginning in the later 18th century, in which various lords abandoned the open field farming of previous centuries and, essentially, took all the best land for themselves in exchange for "freeing" their serfs, may well have made serfdom seem more desirable to many peasant families.

=== Views of Marx ===
In his book Das Kapital, in Chapter 26 entitled "The Secret of Primitive Accumulation" and Chapter 27, "Expropriation of the Agricultural Population from the Land", Marx claimed that the feudal relationships of serfdom were violently transformed into private property and free labour: free of possession and free to sell their labour force on the market. Being liberated from serfdom meant being able to sell one's land and work wherever one desired. "The so-called primitive accumulation, therefore, is nothing else than the historical process of divorcing the producer from the means of production. It appears as primitive, because it forms the pre-historic stage of capital and of the mode of production corresponding with it."

In a case history of England, Marx described how the serfs became free peasant proprietors and small farmers, who were, over time, forcibly expropriated and driven off the land, forming a property-less proletariat. He also claimed that more and more legislation was enacted by the state to control and regiment this new class of wage workers. In the meantime, the remaining farmers became capitalist farmers operating more and more on a commercial basis; and gradually, legal monopolies preventing trade and investment by entrepreneurs were broken up.

Taxes levied by the state took the place of labour dues levied by the lord. Although serfdom began its decline in Europe in the Middle Ages, it took many hundreds of years to disappear completely. In addition, the struggles of the working class during the Industrial Revolution can often be compared with the struggles of the serfs during the Middle Ages. In parts of the world today, forced labour is still used.

=== Russia ===
A 1907 painting by Boris Kustodiev depicting Russian serfs listening to the proclamation of the Emancipation Manifesto in 1861

Serfdom became the dominant form of relation between Russian peasants and nobility in the 17th century. Serfdom only existed in central and southern areas of the Russian Empire. It was never established in the North, in the Urals, nor in Siberia. Historian David Moon argues that serfdom was a response to military and economic factors in Russia. It was socially stable and adaptable to changing demographic and economic conditions; revolts were uncommon. Moon says it was not the cause of Russia's backwardness; instead, backwardness blocked alternative methods that were developed in Western Europe. Moon identifies some benefits for serfs, such as assurances of land and some assistance after bad harvests. Moon argues that Russia's defeat in the Crimean War was a catalyst leading to the abolition of serfdom.

Finally, serfdom was abolished by a decree issued by Tsar Alexander II in 1861. Scholars have proposed multiple overlapping reasons to account for the abolition, including fear of a large-scale revolt by the serfs, the financial needs of the government, evolving cultural sensibilities, the military need for soldiers, and, among Marxists, the unprofitability of serfdom.

== See also ==
- Timeline of abolition of slavery and serfdom
