= Ben Moon =

Ben Moon may refer to:

- Ben Moon (rock climber) (born 1966), British rock climber and business man
- Ben Moon (rugby union) (born 1989), English prop

== See also ==
- Moon (disambiguation)
