= Ji-woong =

- Hangul: 지웅
- RR: Jiung
- MR: Chiung

Ji-woong, also spelled Ji-ung, is a Korean given name.

People with this name include:

- Hwang Ji-woong (born 1989), South Korean football player
- Kim Ji-woong (born 1998), South Korean actor and singer, member of Zerobaseone
- Kim Ji-woong (footballer) (born 1989), South Korean football player
- Park Hyun-bin (born Park Ji-ung, 1982), South Korean trot singer
- Yoon Ji-woong (born 1982), South Korean baseball pitcher

== See also ==
- List of Korean given names
