= Slavery in Russia =

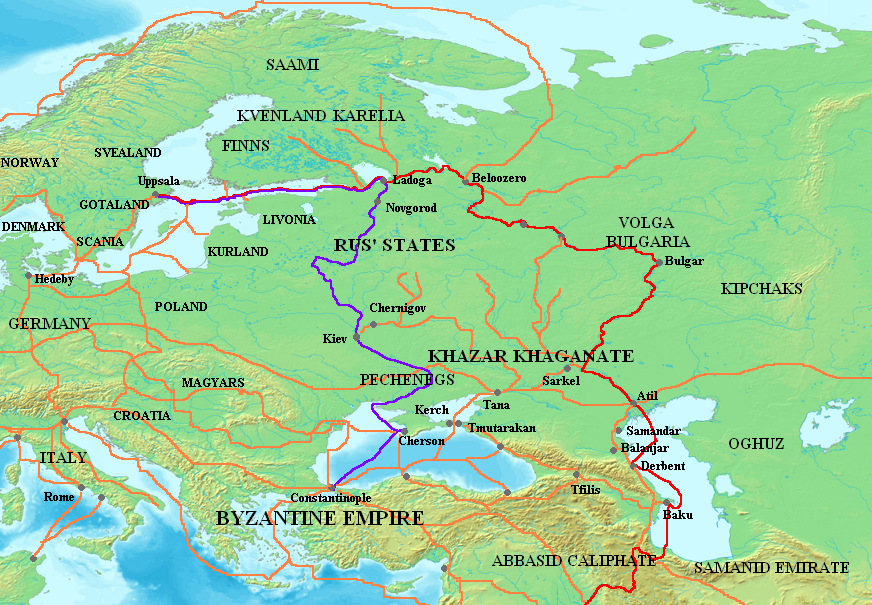
Routes through Slavic territories used for the slave trade: Volga trade route from the Vikings (Varangians) to the Muslim Middle East (red), trade route from the Varangians to the Greeks (Byzantines) (blue) – and other trade routes of the 8th–11th centuries (orange)

While slavery has not been widespread on the territory of what is now Russia since the introduction of Christianity in the 10th century, serfdom in Russia, which was in many ways similar to landless peasantry in Catholic Europe, only ended in February 19th, 1861 when Emperor Alexander II ordered the emancipation of the serfs in 1861. The emancipation of state-owned serfs occurred in 1866.

The Russian term krepostnoi krestyanin (крепостной крестьянин) is usually translated as "serf": an unfree person (to varying degrees according to existing laws) who unlike a slave cannot be owned individually as property, but cannot freely live on or move to any other land than the one they are "attached" to without acquiescence of the land owner, whose land they inhabits mostly as share cropping farmers and labourers. This land can then be bought and sold similarly to peasants on land belonging to European nobility like Lords, Earls, Dukes etc.

The 2023 Global Slavery Index estimates that there are 1,899,000 people – approximately 1.26% of the population, currently living in illegal slavery-like conditions in Russia according to Russian law. This includes forced labour, forced prostitution, debt bondage, forced servile marriage, exploitation of children, and forced prison labour most belonging to marginalised groups like undocumented immigrants from the Caucasus and former Soviet states.

== History ==
=== Kievan Rus' ===
In Kievan Rus' and the Russian principalities, including later the Grand Principality of Moscow, legal systems usually referred to a special type of serfs known as kholopy. Individuals could become a kholop as a result of capture, selling themselves, being sold for debts, committing crimes, or marriage to a kholop. Until the late 10th century, the kholopy represented a majority among the servants who worked lords' lands. The power a master had over the life of a kholop varied over the centuries. Generally, this power increased over time, culminating in the late 16th century when the movement of serfs on George's Day in Autumn—a specially designed day of the year when serfs could freely switch the land they were living on and therefore switch their masters—was forbidden. This power then slowly began to degrade during the next centuries with reforms of Alexei Mikhailovich and Peter the Great.

=== Crimean slave trade ===
Russians themselves were enslaved later. For example, in 1382, the Golden Horde under Khan Tokhtamysh sacked Moscow, burning the city and carrying off thousands of inhabitants as slaves; similar raids occurred routinely until well into the 16th century. In 1521, the combined forces of Crimean Khan Mehmed I Giray and his Kazan allies attacked Moscow and captured thousands of slaves. In 1571, the Crimean Tatars attacked and sacked Moscow, burning everything but the Kremlin and taking thousands of captives as slaves for the Crimean slave trade. In Crimea, about 75% of the population consisted of slaves. The Crimean–Nogai raids into East Slavic lands continued into the 18th century.

An anonymous Lithuanian author wrote in De moribus tartarorum, lituanorum et moscorum:

Among these unfortunates there are many strong ones; if they [the Tatars] have not castrated them yet, they cut off their ears and nostrils, burned cheeks and foreheads with the burning iron and forced them to work with their chains and shackles during the daylight, and sit in the prisons during the night; they are sustained by the meager food consisting of the dead animals' meat, rotten, full of worms, which even a dog would not eat. The youngest women are kept for wanton pleasures ...

=== Tsardom of Russia ===
By the 16th century, the serf population consisted mostly of those who had had become serfs owing to poverty. They worked predominantly as household servants, among the richest families, and indeed generally produced less than they consumed. Laws forbade slave owners to free slaves in times of famine in order to avoid feeding them, and slaves generally remained with their owning family for a long time; the Domostroy, an advice book, speaks of the need to choose slaves of good character and to provide for them properly. Slavery remained a major institution in Russia until 1723, when Peter the Great converted the household slaves into house serfs. The government of Tsar Feodor III had formally converted Russian agricultural slaves into serfs earlier, in 1679.

According to Marshall Poe: "In the mid-seventeenth century, Paul of Aleppo noted that in Muscovy "every rich man" kept numerous Tatar slaves in his house. Olearius agreed: "The slaves and servants of the magnates and other lords are countless.""

=== Russian Siberia ===
Indigenous peoples of Siberia – notably the Yakuts and the Buryats of Eastern Siberia – practised slavery on a smaller scale. With the conquest of Siberia in the 16th and 17th centuries, the Russians enslaved natives in military operations and in Cossack raids. Cases involving native women were frequent, held as concubines, sometimes mortgaged to other men and traded for commercial profit. The Russian government generally opposed the conversion of natives to Christianity because it would free them from paying the yasak, the fur tribute. The government decreed that the non-Christian slaves were to be freed. This in turn led local Russian owners of slaves to petition the government for conversion and even involved forced conversions of their slaves. The rules stipulated that the native convert became a serf of the converter. As an indication of the extent of the slavery system, one voyevoda reported in 1712 that "there is hardly a Cossack in Yakutsk who does not have natives as slaves".

=== Sweden, Finland, and the Baltics ===
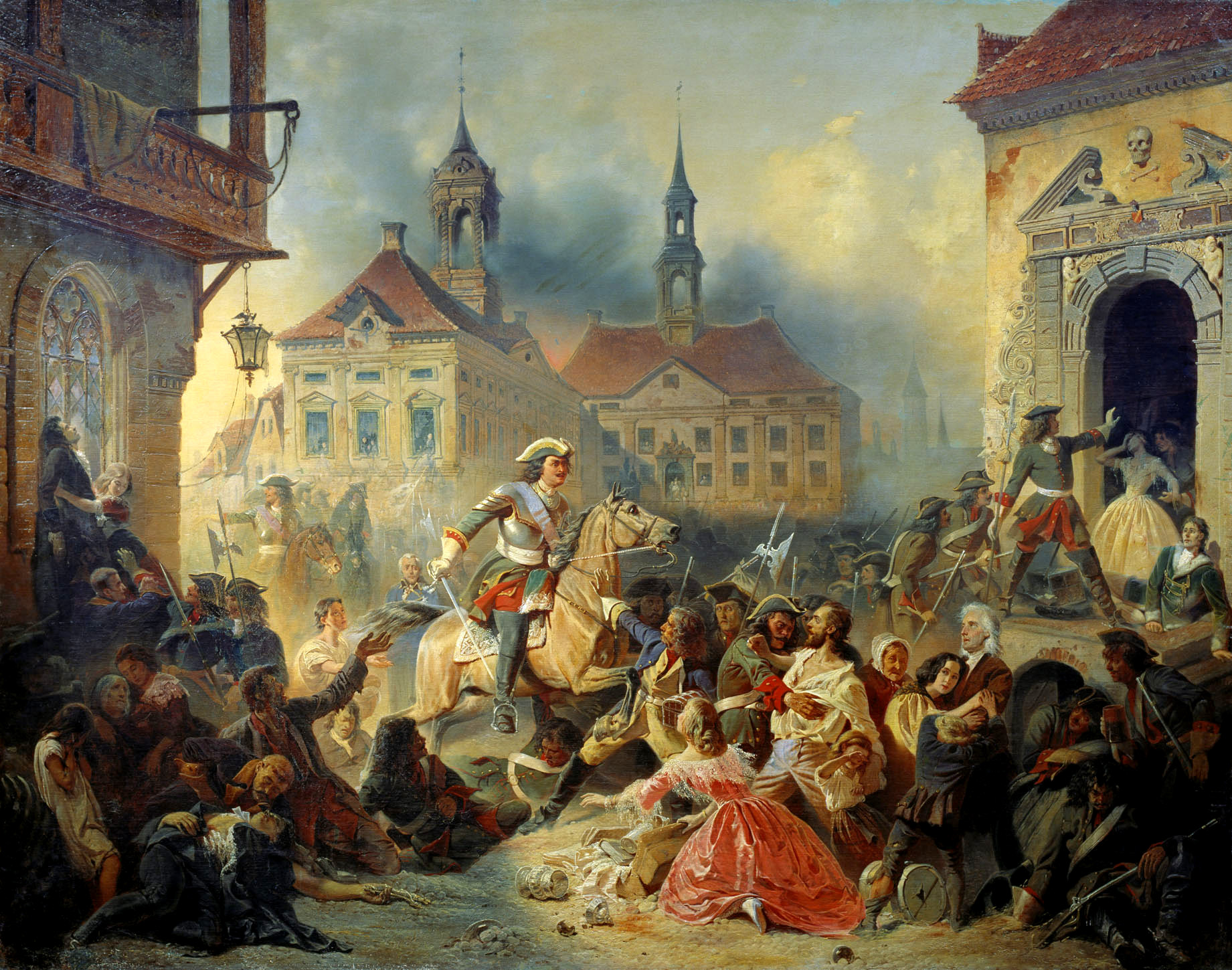
Peter I of Russia pacifies his marauding troops after taking Narva in 1704 by Nikolay Sauerweid, 1859. Many Swedish citizens were captured by Russian soldiers during this occasion, who sold them to the Crimea.

Between the 16th century and the end of the Great Northern War (1700–1721), the Baltics was a part of the Swedish Empire, as was Finland.

The slave raids conducted by private Russian slave traders over the border into Eastern Finland, capturing Finns and trafficking them south to the Black Sea, had been conducted since the Middle Ages and are estimated to have continued throughout the 17th century.

During the Great Northern war between 1700 and 1721, Russia invaded the Eastern provinces of the Swedish Empire in Finland, Estonia and Livonia in the Baltics. Since the 15th century, the Russian Army had allowed private soldiers to capture and sell war captives, and during the Great Northern War many Russian soldiers captured Livonians, Finns, and Baltic civilians (particularly children) from the Swedish provinces and sold them, some of which ended up in the Black Sea slave trade and Persia. One of these occasions was the fall of Narva, where Lovisa von Burghausen was a famous victim of those captured to Russian soldiers with intent to sell. Another case was that of Annika Svahn and Afrosinya. Lovisa, together with two other female slaves, one from Finland and one from Narva, were sold on the Russian slave market in Moscow; the Finnish woman was sold to an Armenian, the woman from Narva to a Russian clerk, and Lovisa to a Turkish-Ottoman merchant.

The Swedish province of Finland was subjected to severe oppression during the Russian invasion and occupation known as the Great Wrath (1714–1721). Among the atrocities were the abductions and enslavement of people by Russian military, some of whom were trafficked via Russia and the Crimean slave trade to Persia and the Middle East, where blonde people were exotic; between 20,000 and 30,000 people are estimated to have been abducted and about a quarter of the Finnish farm houses were reportedly empty at the end of the occupation. Between 10,000 and 20,000 people were taken to serve as slave laborers during the building of Saint Petersburg, about 2,000 men were forcibly enlisted to the Russian army, but many women and children were also abducted as serfs or sex slaves by Russian officers, who in some cases sold them on to the Crimean slave trade; about 4,600 people, the majority of whom were children, were abducted from Österbotten and Eastern Finland.

Many of the Swedish Empire citizens captured and sold by Russian soldiers ended up via the Crimean slave trade in the slave market in Constantiople, where the Swedish ambassador to Constantinople managed to buy some of them free, many of whom were women.

From June 1710, the Swedish ambassador Thomas Funck made trips to the slave market in Constantiople to buy Swedish Empire citizens, tours which were noted by his legation priest Sven Agrell. Agrell noted, for example, the purchase of a "carpenter's daughter from Narva" for §82, a "Captain's wife" for §240, Catharina Pereswetoff-Morath, age 18, for §275, and an entire Livonian family, Anders Jonsson with his wife and children. Those bought free with Swedish funds were probably escorted to the war camp of King Charles XII of Sweden in Bender and returned to Sweden with him. It was noted however, that though many Swedish Empire citizens were bought free by the Swedish ambassador, it was impossible to buy everyone on sale for the limited financial funds during wartime, many young women and children being far too expensive, and that many were therefore purchased on market by actual buyers and left in the Ottoman Empire.

=== Caucasus ===
The Russian conquest of the Caucasus led to the abolition of slavery by the 1860s, as well as following the conquest of the Central Asian khanates of Bukhara, Samarkand, and Khiva by the 1870s. A notorious slave market for captured Russian and Persian slaves was centred in the Khanate of Khiva from the 17th to the 19th century. In 1989, a Russian man who had gone to the Caucasus in search of work ended up in slavery after group of Chechens and Ingush stole his documents. He was only able to gain his freedom after 13 years of life in slave-like conditions in the mountains of the Northern Caucasus.

== Current situation ==
Internal migrants from Russia's poorer regions and foreign migrants are reportedly trafficked (sometimes involving drugging and kidnapping) and then forced to work against their will in brick factories and small farms in Dagestan. Many of Russia's migrant workers are irregular migrants, a status that makes them particularly vulnerable to modern slavery.

Recent (2009–2012) reports have identified human trafficking and slavery of Uzbek nationals in contemporary Russian society.

== See also ==
- That Most Precious Merchandise: The Mediterranean Trade in Black Sea Slaves, 1260-1500
- Forced labor in the Soviet Union
- Black Sea slave trade
- History of slavery in Europe
- History of slavery in Asia
