= Yoon Ji-woong =

South Korean baseball player (born 1988)

NC Dinos – No. 38
- Relief pitcher
- Born: March 11, 1988 (age 37)
- Bats: Left Throws: Left

KBO debut
- May 13, 2011, for the Nexen Heroes

KBO statistics (through July 6, 2019)
- Win–loss record: 12–6
- Holds: 41
- Strikeouts: 179
- Earned run average: 4.53

Teams
- Nexen Heroes (2011); LG Twins (2012–2018); NC Dinos (2019–present)

- Yoon Ji-woong
- Hangul: 윤지웅
- Hanja: 尹智雄
- RR: Yun Jiung
- MR: Yun Chiung

Yoon Ji-woong (Korean: 윤지웅; born March 11, 1988, in Busan) is a South Korean relief pitcher who plays for the NC Dinos of the KBO League. He bats and throws left-handed.

== Amateur career ==
Yoon played college baseball at Dong-eui University. As a sophomore in 2008 he earned MVP honors at the National Amateur Baseball Championship, racking up 3 wins with a 0.00 ERA in 5 games. In the 2008 season, he posted a 0.11 ERA, allowing only one earned run in 85 innings.

In April 2009, Yoon won another MVP at the Spring Collegiate National Baseball Championship, posting 4-0 with a 0.27 ERA and 46 strikeouts in 33 innings. In May 2009, he led his team to its second national championship alongside Moon Kwang-eun at the Summer Collegiate National Baseball Championship, voted for the competition's best pitcher. Yoon finished the 2009 collegiate season with a record of 7-1 and an ERA of 0.15 in 61.1 innings pitched, and was named the best Korean amateur pitcher of the year. After the season, Yoon was selected for the South Korean collegiate national baseball team to compete in the 2009 Asian Baseball Championship held in Sapporo, Japan. At the championship, he was named to the All-Star team as the best left-handed pitcher, hurling a 2.16 ERA with 9 strikeouts in 8.1 innings pitched.

Yoon slumped in the beginning of his last collegiate season, allowing 13 runs with a 7.90 ERA at the Spring Collegiate National Baseball Championship. However, he was called up to the South Korean collegiate national team again to compete in the friendly baseball series against the USA national baseball team. In the series, he posted the lowest ERA (1.80) amongst the eight pitchers on the Korean roster, striking out 14 batters in 10 innings pitched.

=== Notable international careers ===
| Year | Venue | Competition | Team | Individual note |
|---|---|---|---|---|
| 2009 | Japan | Asian Baseball Championship | Bronze medal | 0-1; 2.16 ERA (2 G, 8.1 IP, 2 ER, 9 K) |
| 2009 | Europe | Baseball World Cup | 9th | 1-1, 1 SV; 2.18 ERA (6 G, 17.0 IP, 4 ER, 16 K) |
| 2010 | United States | South Korea vs USA Baseball Series | 0W-5L | 0-0; 1.80 ERA (5 G, 10.0 IP, 2 ER, 14 K) |

== Professional career ==
Yoon was drafted with the third overall pick of the 2011 KBO Draft by the Nexen Heroes. On May 10, 2011, Yoon was called up to the first team for the first time. On March 13, he made his pro league debut against the LG Twins and pitched 1/3 of a scoreless inning. Yoon earned his first career win, tossing 2/3 inning, on July 19 against the LG Twins, coming on in relief in the tenth inning and inducing Lee Jin-young to hit into a double play. In the 2011 season, in which Yoon posted a 2–0 record and a 4.08 ERA, his primary role was as a left-handed relief specialist against left-handed hitters, appearing in 53 games. As a reliever he accumulated 9 holds which was ranked 15th in the KBO league. After the 2011 KBO season, Yoon competed in the 2011 Baseball World Cup as a member of the South Korean national baseball team. In the bottom of the ninth inning of the second round game against Panama, Yoon entered with a 5-4 lead, two out and runners at first and third, and racked up a save, inducing a flyout to center from César Quintero.

=== Notable international careers ===
| Year | Venue | Competition | Team | Individual Note |
|---|---|---|---|---|
| 2011 | Panama | Baseball World Cup | 6th | 0-1, 1 SV; 5.40 ERA (7 G, 6.2 IP, 4 ER, 6 K) |
