= List of people with the Korean family name Moon =

Koreans with the surname Moon

Moon (Korean: 문; Hanja: 文), also spelled Mun, is a Korean family name. The 2000 South Korean census found a total of 426,927 people and 132,881 households with this family name. This is a list of notable people with the family name Moon, sorted by area of notability and year of birth.

== Culture and the arts ==
- Moon Deoksu (1928–2020), South Korean poet
- Moon Hee-jung, South Korean television screenwriter
- Moon Hyung-in, South Korean biotechnology professor
- Mun Ikchŏm (1329–1398), politician of the Goryeo Dynasty and a Neo-Confucian scholar
- Mun Il-pyeong (1888–1939), Joseon Dynasty historian
- Moon In-soo (1945–2021), South Korean poet
- Mun Jeonghui (born 1947), South Korean poet
- Jiha Moon (born 1973), South Korean contemporary artist
- Mun Kyong-jin (born 1981), possibly deceased North Korean violinist
- Moon Kyungwon (born 1969), South Korean artist
- Nami Mun (born 1968), Korean American novelist and short story writer
- Moon Shin (1923–1995), South Korean painter and sculptor
- Mun Tae-jun (born 1970), South Korean poet
- Moon Young-nam (born 1960), South Korean television screenwriter

== Entertainers ==
- Moon Bin (1998–2023), South Korean singer, member of boy band Astro
- Moon Byul-yi (born 1992), South Korean singer and rapper, member of girl group Mamamoo
- Moon Chae-won (born 1986), South Korean actress
- Eric Mun (born 1979), South Korean rapper, member of boy band Shinhwa
- Moon Ga-young (born 1996), German-born South Korean actress
- Moon Geun-young (born 1987), South Korean actress
- Moon Hee (born 1947), South Korean actress
- Moon Hee-joon (born 1978), South Korean singer-songwriter, member of boy band H.O.T.
- Moon Hee-kyung (born 1965), South Korean actress
- Moon Jeong-hee (born 1976), South Korean actress
- Moon Ji-hoo (born 1991), South Korean singer and actor, former member of boy band A-Jax
- Moon Ji-hoon (born 1986), South Korean rapper
- Moon Ji-in (born 1986), South Korean actress
- Moon Ji-yoon (1984–2020), South Korean actor
- Moon Jong-up (born 1995), South Korean dancer and singer, member of boy band B.A.P
- Moon Joon-young (born 1989), South Korean singer and actor, member of boy band ZE:A
- Moon Jun-won (born 1987), South Korean actor
- Moon Nam-sook, South Korean voice actress
- Moon Sang-min (born 2000), South Korean actor and model
- Moon Se-yoon (born 1982), South Korean comedian and television personality
- Moon Seong-hyun (born 2006), South Korean actor
- Moon Sua (born 1999), South Korean Singer, member of girl group Billlie
- Moon So-ri (born 1974), South Korean actress, film director and screenwriter
- Moon Sung-keun (born 1953), South Korean actor and politician
- Moon Won-joo (born 1980), South Korean actor
- Moon Woo-jin (born 2009), South Korean actor
- Moon Ye-bong (1917–1999), North Korean actress
- Moon Ye-won (born 1991), South Korean actress

== Political figures ==
- Moon Chung-in (born 1951), South Korean politician
- Moon Hyung-bae (born 1966), South Korean judge
- Moon Jae-in (born 1953), South Korean politician, civil servant and lawyer, 12th president of South Korea
- Moon Kook-hyun (born 1949), South Korean politician, leader of the Creative Korea Party
- Moon Myung-soon (born 1962), South Korean politician
- Ronald Moon (1940–2022), American judge, former Chief Justice of the Hawaii State Supreme Court
- Mun Se-gwang (1951–1974), Japanese-born North Korean sympathizer who attempted to assassinate South Korean president Park Chung-Hee
- Moon Sung-keun (born 1953), South Korean actor and politician

== Religious figures ==
- Moon Ik-hwan (1918–1994), South Korean theologian
- Sun Myung Moon (1920–2012), South Korean religious leader, founder of the Unification Church, and his children
  - Heung Jin Moon (1966–1984)
  - Un Jin Moon (born 1967)
  - Moon Kook-jin (born 1970)
- Mun Jeong-hyeon (born c. 1941), South Korean Catholic priest

== Sports figures ==
=== Football ===
- Moon Dae-seong (born 1986), South Korean footballer
- Moon Chang-jin (born 1993), South Korean professional footballer
- Mun In-guk (born 1978), North Korean former professional footballer
- Moon Je-chun (born 1987), South Korean footballer
- Moon Jeong-joo (born 1990), South Korean footballer
- Moon Joo-won (born 1983), South Korean footballer
- Moon Jung-sik (1930–2006), South Korean football player and manager
- Moon Ki-han (born 1989), South Korean footballer
- Moon Min-kui (born 1981), South Korean footballer
- Moon Sang-yun (born 1991), South Korean footballer
- Moon Seon-min (born 1992), South Korean footballer
- Moon Soon-ho (born 1981), South Korean former footballer

=== Others ===
- Moon Dae-sung (born 1976), South Korean retired taekwondo athlete, Olympic gold medalist
- Moon Dong-ju (born 2003), South Korean professional baseball player
- Moon Eui-jae (born 1975), South Korean retired wrestler, Olympic silver medalist
- Moon Ho-joon (born 1997), South Korean professional esports player
- Moon Hyang-ja (born 1972), South Korean team handball player, Olympic gold medalist
- Mun Ji-hee (born 1988), South Korean biathlete
- Moon Jin-ju, South Korean wrestler
- Mun Jun (born 1982), South Korean speed skater
- Moon Kwang-eun (born 1987), South Korean baseball player
- Moon Kyeong-ha (born 1980), South Korean handball player, Olympic athlete
- Moon Kyung-eun (born 1971), South Korean former professional basketball player and coach
- Moon Kyung-ja (born 1965), South Korean former basketball player, Olympic silver medalist
- Moon Pil-hee (born 1982), South Korean handball player, Olympic athlete
- Mun Sung-hak (born 1990), South Korean racing driver
- Moon Sung-hyun (born 1991), South Korean baseball player
- Moon Sung-kil (born 1963), South Korean former professional boxer
- Moon Sung-min (born 1986), South Korean volleyball player
- Moon Tae-jong (born 1975), Korean American former professional basketball player
- Moon Young-hui (born 1983), South Korean field hockey player, Olympic athlete
- Mun Yu-ra (born 1990), South Korean weightlifter

== See also ==
- List of Korean family names
