= Forbidden years =

The Forbidden Years (Note: Russian: Заповедные лета, romanized: Zepovednyye leta, pre-reform spelling: заповѣдныя лѣта.) were part of a tightening of the service obligations of serfs in Russia leading to full-scale serfdom in the 17th through 19th centuries. They were first instituted by Tsar Ivan IV (r. 1533–1584) in 1581 as a temporary measure, but eventually became permanent.

== History ==
Under the provisions of Article 57 of the Sudebnik of 1497 promulgated by Grand Prince Ivan III, serfs were permitted to transfer from one estate to another "once a year, during the week before and a week after St. George's Day in the autumn" (November 26, the Feast of the Dedication of the Church of St. George in Kiev) provided they had fulfilled all corvée (barshchina, барщина in Russian) and/or quitrent (obrok, оброк in Russian) obligations and had paid a fee, the pozhiloe (пожилое), to the landlord they were leaving. In Ivan IV's Sudebnik of 1550, this right of transfer remained (Article 88), but the pozhiloe was increased and a tax (the transition fee or za povoz – за повоз) was added.

Due to the hardships brought about by Ivan IV's Livonian War (1558–1582), the excesses of the oprichnina (1565–1572), Tatar raids (such as the one on Moscow in 1571) and a series of crop failures and other natural disasters, the tsar temporarily suspended this right of movement or transfer in an ukaz (decree) issued in 1581. This move, in fact, proved permanent, as it was never lifted. His son's government made this limitation permanent in an ukaz of September 1, 1597 (thought on November 24 of that year, it made the statute of limitations (called "fixed years" – urochniye leta, урочные лета) on the return of run-away serfs five years). The Ulozhenie of 1649 did away with this statute of limitations, and this is often seen as the final element of full-blown serfdom in Russia.
