= ABC of Emergency Radiology =

Non-fiction work by Otto Chan

- Author: Dr Otto Chan (Editor)
- Language: English
- Genre: Nonfiction
- Publication date: 2007
- Publication place: England
- Media type: Paperback
- ISBN: 978-0-7279-1528-3
- Dewey Decimal: 305.42 21

ABC of Emergency Radiology is a book edited by British radiologist Otto Chan. It is meant to be useful in emergencies by providing examples to refer to. The book addresses the difficulties in evaluating a radiograph during emergency situations. It also highlights comparisons between normal and abnormal radiographs. One of the main themes of the book is how to avoid the mistakes that can occur. It is aimed at trainee radiologists and medical students. It presents radiology from a British perspective and emphasizes plain radiography and sonography.
