= Flower moon (disambiguation) =

The flower moon is a full moon occurring in May in the Farmers' Almanac.

Flower moon may also refer to:

- "Flower Moon", a song by Vampire Weekend from the 2019 album Father of the Bride
- Killers of the Flower Moon (film), a 2023 American film by Martin Scorsese

== See also ==
- Moonflower (disambiguation)
