= Moon River (disambiguation) =

"Moon River" is a 1961 song by Johnny Mercer and Henry Mancini.

Moon River may also refer to:

== Rivers ==
- Moon River (Ontario), a river in west central Ontario, Canada
- Moon River, near Savannah, Georgia, in the United States; see Herb River
- Moon River, better known as the Mun River, a tributary of the Mekong in Thailand
- Moon River, better known as the Yue River, a river in Shaanxi, China

== Entertainment ==
- Moon River (radio program), a long-running radio program
- Moon River (TV series), a 2025 South Korean television series
- Moon River: The Very Best of Andy Williams, a 2009 album by Andy Williams
- Moon River and Other Great Movie Themes, a 1962 album by Andy Williams

== Other uses ==
- Moon River (gin cocktail), a cocktail prepared with gin
- Moon River, Ontario, Canada
- Moon River Brewing Company, Savannah, Georgia
- MV Moon River, a Singaporean coaster

== See also ==
- Halfmoon River, in the U.S. state of Georgia
- Loon River
- Moon (disambiguation)
