= Moone (disambiguation) =

Moone is a village in County Kildare, Ireland.

Moone may also refer to:

- Dr. June Moone, "the Enchantress", comic book supervillain; see Enchantress (DC Comics)
- Maggie Moone, British singer
- Thomas Moone (1908–1986), American ice hockey player

== See also ==
- Moone Boy, Irish sitcom by Chris O'Dowd
