= Peter Moon =

Peter Moon may refer to:

- Sir Peter Moon (diplomat) (1928–1991), British high commissioner and ambassador
- Peter Moon (comedian) (born 1953), Australian comedian
- Peter Moon, author of books relating to the postulated Montauk Project
- Peter Moon (musician) (1944–2018), Hawaiian musician
- Sir Peter Moon (1942–2023), 5th Baronet of Portman Square
