= Mick Moon =

Australian Victoria Cross recipient

Rupert "Mick" Moon VC
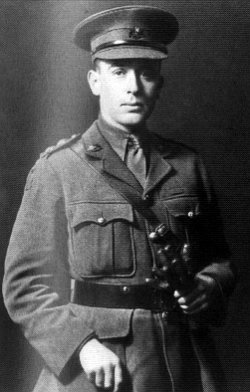
- Born: 14 August 1892; Bacchus Marsh, Victoria
- Died: 28 February 1986 (aged 93); Barwon Heads, Victoria
- Burial place: Mount Duneed Cemetery
- Spouse: Susan Alison May Vincent
- Military career
- Allegiance: Australia
- Branch: Australian Army
- Service years: 1914–1919; 1942–1945
- Rank: Captain
- Nickname: "Mick"
- Units: 58th Battalion
- Conflicts: First World War; Second World War
- Awards: Victoria Cross

Rupert Theo Vance "Mick" Moon (14 August 1892 – 28 February 1986) was an Australian recipient of the Victoria Cross, the highest award for gallantry in the face of the enemy that can be awarded to British and Commonwealth forces.

== Early life and First World War ==
Moon was born at Bacchus Marsh, Victoria, on 14 August 1892. He was the son of Mr and Mrs Arthur Moon of Kinaird, Toorak, Victoria. When he left school he worked for the National Bank of Australasia and was at the Maffra branch when World War I began in the summer of 1914. He was 24 years old, and a lieutenant in the 58th Battalion, Australian Imperial Force, during the First World War when the following deed took place for which he was awarded the VC.

At 2.30pm on 11 May 1917 Major C. Denehy, acting OC 58th Battalion (58/Bn), called his officers to a headquarters conference to discuss the three Bullecourt, France, objectives given to them by Brig-Gen. Harold Elliott: "A" Coy - a concrete machine gun nest; "B" Coy - the German trench and dugouts; and "C" Coy - securing the crossroads and beyond.

Lieutenant R. V. Moon was a 24-year-old bank clerk who, as a 4th Light Horse NCO had transferred to 58/Bn after Fromelles. His "A" Coy platoon, of 28 men and two Lewis guns, were given the difficult task of taking the concrete machine-gun nest facing the Australians.

On 12 May 1917, during the hours leading-up to zero the Germans unleashed a terrific bombardment, which Elliot described as the worst he had ever been under. Prospects for success diminished particularly when only one of the three section of Stokes guns was left in action.

With Moon flinging bombs, he led his platoon towards their objectives in the face of fierce resistance. Despite a severe facial wound, Moon kept rallying his dwindling numbers. Inspired by his leadership, his platoon took control of the strongpoint. Moon then led his men towards "B" Coy's objective, who were struggling against German reinforcements emerging from a nearby dugout system. When some of his platoon wavered, Moon, despite a second wound that left him dazed and deafened, waved his swagger stick and called encouragement.

Moon's decisive leadership tipped the balance. He positioned one of his Lewis Gun to enfilade the German trench and the superior number of retreating defenders. Those that retreated to their dugout were trapped by Moon rushing to the dugout entrance and firing inside.

Though the Australians were successful the British advance on Moon's left, had been less so, making the 58/Bn's third objective impossible in daylight. Moon was hit again, but because of the situation on the left, refused to leave the field. After sitting down for a brief rest he convened a conference with two other 58/Bn lieutenants. In the process of reorganising the remaining troops, Moon was hit again – his jaw was broken and twelve teeth were shattered. It was not until the new position was secure that Moon was assisted to the rear. After nightfall, the Australians took control of the vital crossroads to complete the difficult assignment. Three hundred yards of the Hindenburg Line and its strongpoints had been taken: five machine-guns, three flame-throwers, two bomb-throwing machines, and 186 prisoners, mostly trapped by Moon and fifteen or so of his platoon, had been captured.

In Elliott's account of the battle, "Mickey" Moon monopolised the superlatives. Once he had doubted if Moon had the makings of an officer, but carrying on with his jaw broken and three other wounds as well was exceptional gallantry, and Elliott submitted his name for the VC. Moon was the only member of the 15th Brigade to be awarded the VC. The citation for his VC appeared in The London Gazette in June 1917 and reads as follows:

For most conspicuous bravery during an attack on an enemy strong point.

His own immediate objective was a position in advance of the hostile trench, and thence against the hostile trench itself, after the capture of which it was intended that his men should co-operate in a further assault on a strong point further in rear.

Although wounded in the initial advance, he reached his first objective.

Leading his men against the trench itself, he was again badly wounded and incapacitated for the moment.

He nevertheless inspired and encouraged his men and captured the trench. Lt. Moon continued to lead his much diminished command in the general attack with the utmost valour, being again wounded, and the attack was successfully pressed home.

During the consolidation of the position, this officer was again badly wounded, and it was only after this fourth and severe wound through the face that he consented to retire from the fight.

His bravery was magnificent, and was largely instrumental in the successful issue against superior numbers, the safe-guarding of the flank of the attack and the capture of many prisoners and machine guns.

Moon, who later reached the rank of captain, received his VC from King George V at an investiture at Buckingham Palace in August, having by then recovered from his wounds. The medal is now displayed at the Hall of Valour at the Australian War Memorial.

== Post-war and later life ==
During the Federal elections of 1919, Brigadier-General "Pompey" Elliott engaged Moon as his election campaign "secretary". At the time Moon, who was unemployed and finding it difficult to adjust to civilian life, appreciated the offer of employment. Elliott calculated that his fame, together with a VC winner, would do his campaign in country Victoria, no harm. Together they were enthusiastically received, particularly by the returned AIF.

After working for Elliott, Moon, being unsettled and fighting nervous reactions to his war experiences, left Australia to settle in Malaya as a rubber planter.

After he returned from the war he resumed working for the National Bank in Geelong, a position he held until he took up a senior position with Dennys Lascelles Ltd. On 17 December 1931 he married Sammy Vincent at St George's Church Geelong.

He lived at Calder Park, Mount Duneed, from 1954 to 1978. He died at his home at Barwon Heads on 28 February 1986 and was buried in the Anglican section of Mount Duneed Cemetery.

== Legacy ==
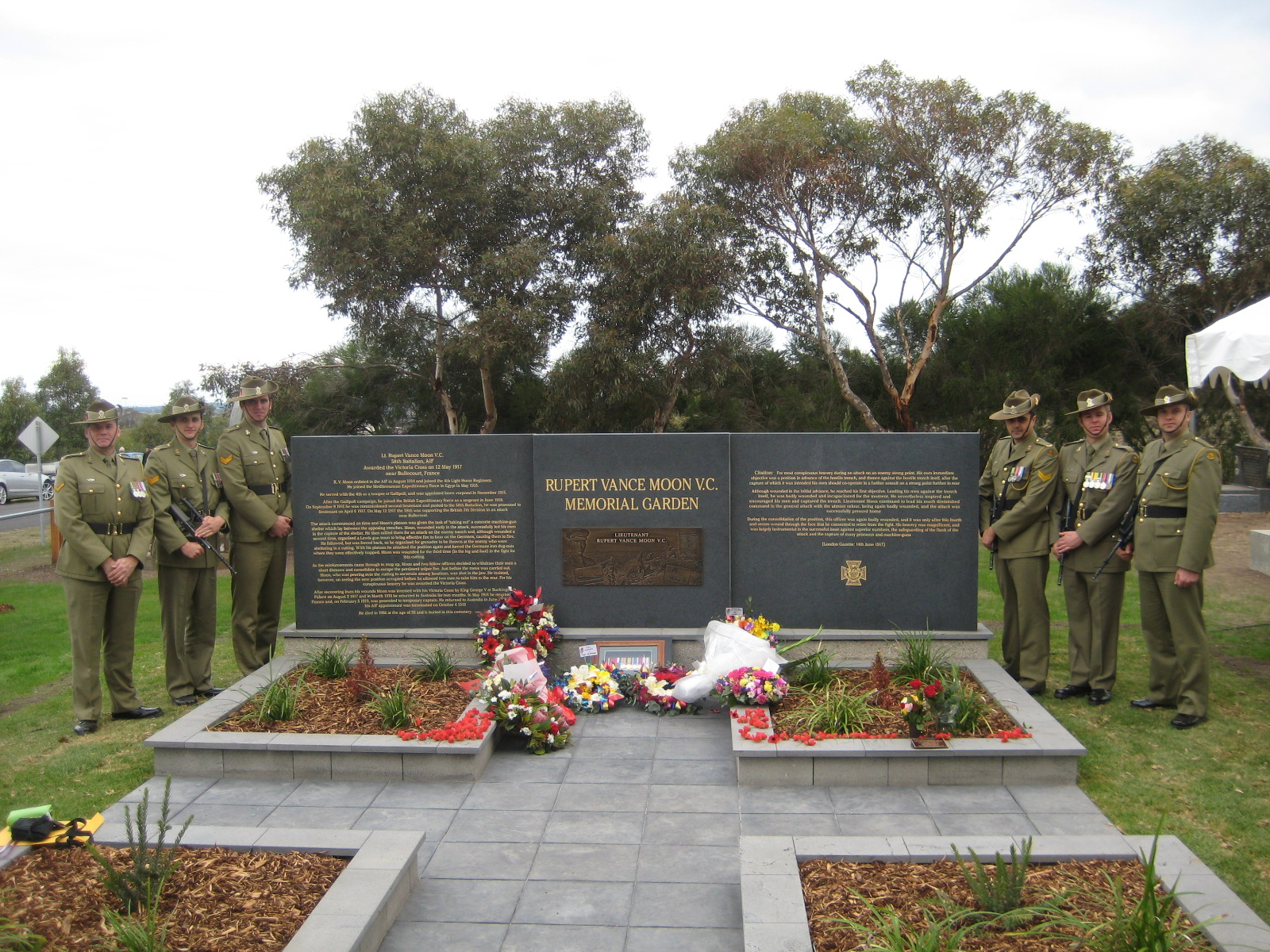
Memorial Garden with Army Reservists of 5th/6th Battalion, Royal Victoria Regiment

In 1918 an avenue of honour was created linking Bacchus Marsh to the Western Highway. Constructed from elm trees, the avenue was planted to commemorate soldiers from Bacchus Marsh who served in the First World War. The 164th tree in the avenue was planted and dedicated to Moon. In recent years, Moon Reserve was unveiled at the beginning of the Avenue of Honour in honour of Rupert Vance Moon. In 2010, the Avenue of Honour was nominated to be placed on the National Heritage list.

On 12 May 2008, the Rupert Vance Moon V.C. Memorial Garden was unveiled at the Mount Duneed Cemetery, with a large crowd in attendance, including Moon's descendants, representatives from the Returned and Services League of Australia, and past and present soldiers.
