= David Mooney =

David Mooney may refer to:

- Dave Mooney (born 1984), Irish footballer
- David J. Mooney, professor of bioengineering
