= Moonflower =

Moonflower may refer to:

== Plants ==
A common name for several night-blooming plants, some with white flowers, including:

- Several night-blooming cereus species
  - Selenicereus (moonlight cactus) and its species, including those formerly placed in Hylocereus
  - Strophocactus wittii (Amazon moonflower)
- Datura species
  - Datura innoxia
- Ipomoea species previously separated in Calonyction
  - Ipomoea alba
- Mentzelia species
  - Mentzelia decapetala
  - Mentzelia pumila
- Oenothera (evening primrose)
- Brugmansia x candida (Datura x candida, angel's trumpet)

== Books ==
- The Moon Flower, a science fiction serial aired in 1953 G K Saunders
- Moon-Flower, by Zoë Akins, adapted from a Hungarian play by Lajos Bíró.

== Music ==
- Moonflowers (band)
- Moonflower (album), a 1977 album by Carlos Santana
  - "Flor d'Luna (Moonflower)", the track from the album
- Moon Flower (album), a 2008 album by The Underneath
- Moonflowers (album), a 2021 album by Swallow the Sun
- "Moonflower", a song from Mark Heard's 1983 album Eye of the Storm
- "Moonflower", a song by Schiller from the 2008 single "Time for Dreams"
- "Moonflowers", a song sung by Dorothy Lamour in the 1952 film Road to Bali
- "Moon Flower", a song by Kitaro from Spiritual Garden
- "Tsukihana" (Japanese: moonflower), a Japanese song by Nana Kitade
- "月の花 Tsuki no hana" ("Moon Flower"), a Japanese song by Jinn from Qualia

== Other ==
- The callsign of Italian airline Neos
- Fictional characters from the Hasbro animated series Hanazuki: Full of Treasures

== See also ==
- Flower moon (disambiguation)
