= Moon Kwang-eun =

South Korean baseball player

LG Twins – No. 61
- Pitcher
- Born: November 9, 1987 (age 38)
- Bats: Right Throws: Right

KBO debut
- July 31, 2010, for the SK Wyverns

KBO statistics (through July 31, 2019)
- Win–loss record: 6–13
- Earned run average: 6.64
- Strikeouts: 176
- Stats at Baseball Reference

Teams
- SK Wyverns (2010–2018); LG Twins (2018–present)

- Moon Kwang-eun
- Hangul: 문광은
- Hanja: 文光垠
- RR: Mun Gwangeun
- MR: Mun Kwangŭn

Moon Kwang-eun (Korean: 문광은; born November 9, 1987, in Gwangju, South Korea) is a South Korean pitcher who plays for the LG Twins of the KBO League.
