= Angus Moon =

British barrister

Philip Charles Angus Moon KC (normally known as "Angus Moon") (born 17 September 1962) is a barrister and joint head of Serjeant's Inn chambers, London. He was called to Bar 1986 and was appointed as a Queen's Counsel in 2006. He works in a wide range of fields including medical negligence, employment, Court of Protection, inquests, police and public and regulatory law. He is married to Florence and they have 4 children. He has 5 brothers and a sister.

His brother Perran Moon has been the Labour MP for Cambourne and Redruth since 2024
