= David Moon (rugby league) =

Australian rugby league footballer

Personal information
- Full name: David Moon
- Born: 28 May 1964 (age 62)

Playing information
- Position: Wing, Centre
Club
Years	Team	Pld	T	G	FG	P
1984–85	Illawarra Steelers	34	3	9	0	30
1986–88	South Sydney	24	3	0	0	12
1988–89	Hull FC	20	8	0	0	32
1989–91	Illawarra Steelers	31	13	0	0	42
	Total	109	27	9	0	116
- Source: As of 27 February 2019

David Moon (born 28 May 1964) is an Australian former professional rugby league footballer who played in the 1980s and 1990s. Moon played for Illawarra twice, South Sydney and Hull FC. He is the brother of Jason Moon who played for South Sydney and Illawarra.

== Playing career ==
Moon made his first grade debut for Illawarra in Round 1 1984 against Balmain at Leichhardt Oval. Moon played with Illawarra up until the end of 1985 as the club finished last on the table claiming the wooden spoon.

In 1986, Moon joined South Sydney and played a total of 20 games in his first season there as Souths finished 2nd on the table. Souths then went on to lose both finals games with Moon featuring in both those matches.

Injuries restricted Moon to only 4 appearances over the next 2 seasons until he was released by Souths and joined English side Hull F.C. Moon spent 1988 and 1989 playing for Hull before returning to Australia and signing with former club Illawarra.

In Moon's second spell with Illawarra, the club finished last in his first season back winning only 2 matches all year. In 1990, Illawarra improved on the field with Moon finishing as the top try scorer with 11 tries. Moon retired at the end of 1991, 1 year before Illawarra were to go within 1 game of reaching their first grand final.
