= Moon (given name) =

Moon is a given name. Notable people with the name include:

- Moon Bloodgood, actress and model
- Moon Landrieu, politician and former Mayor of New Orleans
- Moon Martin, singer and songwriter
- Moon Moon Sen, Indian actress
- Moon Zappa, actress and writer
- Moon Butterfly, supporting character in Star vs. the Forces of Evil and is Queen of the planet Mewni
