= Fixed years =

Fixed years (Russian: Урочные лета, romanized: urochniye leta) was the term used in Russian documents for the statute of limitations during which a run-away serf could be sought out and returned to his landlord. They were fixed at five years by an ukaz (decree) of Tsar Fedor Ivanovich issued on November 24, 1597. They were done away with as part of the Ulozhenie of 1649, where there was no limit on the time a serf could be sought out and returned to his estate.

== See also ==
- George's Day in Autumn
