= David Moon (historian) =

British environmental historian

David Moon is anniversary professor in history at the University of York. He is a specialist in the rural life of the Russian Empire from the seventeenth to the twentieth centuries. Moon also has an interest in environmental history and has received an International Network Grant for £123,000 from the Leverhulme Trust for research in that area.

Moon earned his BA at the University of Newcastle and PhD at the University of Birmingham. He is a fellow of the Royal Historical Society.

Moon's The Plough that Broke the Steppes: Agriculture and Environment on Russia's Grasslands, 1700-1914 (2013) was selected as one of the Financial Times' history books of the year for 2013.

== Selected publications ==
- Russian Peasants and Tsarist Legislation on the Eve of Reform: Interaction between Peasants and Officialdom 1825-1855. Basingstoke and London: Macmillan, 1992.
- The Russian Peasantry 1600-1930: The World the Peasants Made. London and New York: Addison Wesley Longman, 1999.
- The Abolition of Serfdom in Russia 1762-1907. Harlow and London: Longman, 2001.
- The Plough that Broke the Steppes: Agriculture and Environment on Russia's Grasslands, 1700-1914. Oxford: Oxford University Press, 2013.
