= Excerpta Latina Barbari =

Latin translation of a 5th or 6th century Greek chronicle

A historiated initial P at the start of the Excerpta, showing the temptation of Eve

The Excerpta Latina Barbari, (Note: 'Latin extracts of the barbarian' (Garstad 2018a) or 'The Barbarian's Latin Excerpts' (Burgess 2013, p. 2).) also called the Chronographia Scaligeriana, (Note: 'Scaligerian chronograph') is a late antique historical compilation, originally composed in Greek in AD 527–539 but surviving only in a Latin translation from the late 8th century. The identities of the author/compiler of the original and of the translator unknown.

== Naming and genre ==
The name Excerpta Latina Barbari, by which the work is now conventionally known, is derived from the description of its first editor, Joseph Justus Scaliger (1540–1609). He described it as "quite useful excerpts from the first chronological volume of Eusebius, Africanus, and others, translated into Latin by a senseless ignoramus who had no skill at Greek or Latin." (Note: Burgess 2013, p. 2: Excerpta utilissima ex priore libro chronologico Eusebii, et Africano, et aliis Latine conuersa ab homine barbaro, inepto, Hellenismi et Latinitatis imperitissimo.) The unflattering epithet Barbarus Scaligeri ('Scaliger's barbarian') may be given to the unidentified author or translator, but is also used as a name of the chronicle.

The conventional name is misleading in that the work does not consist of excerpts. In 1579, the earliest reference to it in print referred to it as an "Alexandrine chronicle". (Note: Burgess 2013, p. 3: chronica Alexandrina.) Benjamin Garstad still identifies it as a world chronicle. Richard Burgess, however, argues that it is not a true chronicle but rather a chronograph, which he defines as "a collection of genealogies and regnal lists, usually in the form of a chronological outline of human history, to which or into which can be added any other sorts of texts that relate to chronology, such as lists of important historical events, episcopal lists, calendars, and consular lists, as well as analyses and discussions of that chronology."

== Date and place ==
=== Greek original ===
There are many internal indications that the surviving Latin text is a translation of a Greek original. These include its broadly Egyptian and more narrowly Alexandrian focus, its use of Greek sources and Greek holdovers in its grammar and lexicon. This fact was immediately recognized by the early humanists who examined the text.

The scholarly consensus is that the earliest stage in the composition of the Excerpta took place in Alexandria and that it attained its final form during the reign of Justinian I (r. 527–565). Burgess dates it to between 527 and 539, the date of the last entry in the related Consularia Vindobonensia posteriora. There is some disagreement, however, about the date of the first stage and about the location of the final stage. Garstad places the original composition in the early 5th century. (Note: Garstad 2012, p. xx, describes this early "chronicle" as "a chronology with brief, mostly biblical elaborations and a series of king lists".) Burgess allows that it may have been completed in the late 5th century, but argues that the work which was expanded into its final form under Justinian must have been updated already during the reign of Justin I (r. 518–527). (Note: The original work corresponds to the first and second parts in Burgess's division. See Burgess 2010 and Burgess 2013, pp. 18–19.) Garstad believes that the expansion of the original work under Justinian may have taken place in Constantinople.

=== Latin translation ===
It is generally agreed that the Latin translation was made in Francia. (Note: This is agreed by Garstad 2018a and Burgess & Bell 2018, although earlier Burgess 2010 had allowed for the possibility of a translation made in Italy.) Traditionally, it was dated to the late 7th or early 8th century, the later Merovingian period. This date was based on the addition, in the translation, of the Trojan legend of Frankish origins. The historian Carl Frick also argued that Latin contained characteristics typical of Merovingian Francia.

The traditional dating went hand-in-hand with the dating of the surviving Latin manuscript. Richard Schöne dated the manuscript to the late 7th or early 8th century. E. A. Lowe in the 1950s and Jean Porcher in 1967 revised this dating on paleographic and artistic grounds, narrowing its location to the abbey of Corbie and pushing forward its time period to the late 8th century. The most likely decade for the translation and the manuscript is the 780s, the early Carolingian period.

The quality of the Latin translation is universally regarded as poor. Comparing it with classical Latin led Scaliger to attack the translator's competence. While the translation is poor even by 8th-century standards, it is much closer to the standard vulgar Latin of the day than Scaliger realized. Earlier scholarship was uncertain whether the translator's first language was Latin or Greek, but it was probably neither. The translator's first language was either a very early form of Old French or a Germanic language. He was probably a student at Corbie without complete mastery of proper Latin and Greek. It has been suggested that he may have had an association with the monastery of Cimiez. (Note: This is based on the addition to the list of kings of Sparta of a certain Cemenelaus, which appears to be a variation of Cemeneleus, the Latin name of Cimiez. See Burgess 2013, p. 38.)

== Content and sources ==
The Excerpta is composed of three sections. (Note: This is the division as found in Baldwin, Kazhdan & Cutler 1991; Burgess 2013; and Burgess & Bell 2018. Earlier, Burgess 2010 divided the middle section into two parts based on Julius Africanus and Eusebius. Garstad 2012 divides the text into two books (Liber I and Liber II), combining the consularia and other lists in the second.)

- The first part is a recension of the Liber generationis from AD 235. It covers the period from Adam to the death of Cleopatra VII. The version used by the compiler was heavily interpolated and has been called the Chronicon mundi Alexandrinum ('Alexandrian world chronicle') or Chronographia Alexandrina ('Alexandrian chronograph'). In this part, in §86, there is the earliest written reference to the names of the Biblical Magi, which are spelled Bithisarea, Melchior and Gathaspa.
- The second part is a collection of regnal lists mainly derived from the Chronographiae of Sextus Julius Africanus from AD 211. These include lists of Egyptian, Assyrian, Persian and Greek rulers. Not from Africanus are the list of High Priests of Israel and the list of Roman emperors. Attached to the Egyptian and high priestly lists are a series of literary notices, including the only surviving mention of the "Jewish Homer", Sosates.
- The third part is a consularia, that is, "a chronicle that has been created from a consular list". It has been called the Consularia Scaligeriana. It is a version of the Consularia Vindobonensia posteriora that was augmented with other material at Alexandria. In its surviving form, it is therefore "a Latin translation of a Greek translation of a Latin original". It begins with Julius Caesar's victory in the civil war of 46 BC and ends with the year AD 387. This is not the original scope, however, since the manuscript is defective and the very end is missing.

== Manuscripts ==
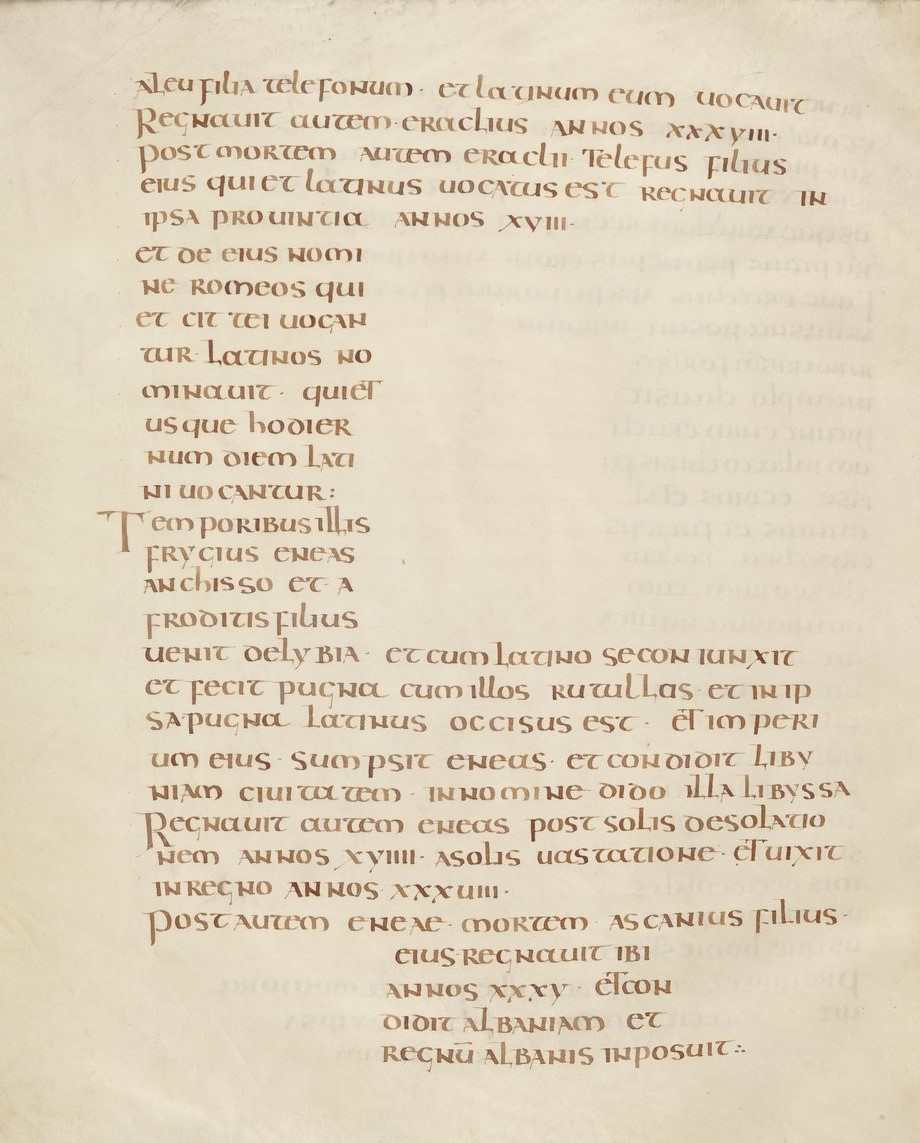
A page from the Excerpta showing a space left for an illustration that was never completed

Only the Latin translation of the Excerpta survives and in a single manuscript. It is not the autograph of the translator, but the original good copy made from his drafts and thus dates to the 770s or 780s and was made at Corbie. Its shelfmark today is Paris, Bibliothèque nationale de France, Lat. 4884 (or Parisinus latinus 4884). It is a codex composed of seven quires. It is written in a distinct variety of Caroline minuscule pioneererd by Abbot Maurdramnus, who governed Corbie in 772–781. It has high clarity and is easy to read.

The Greek exemplar from which the translation was made was apparently riddled with errors. It was probably a mass-produced copy, one of several written by a group of scribes taking dictation. It was probably produced in the 6th century and written in uncial script. By the 8th century, it had also suffered damage. Originally consisting of nine quires, the eighth quire was lost and when the codex was rebound the back cover was not replaced, allowing the last page to be defaced over time. For this reason, the translation is missing the consuls for the period from around AD 100 to 296.

In every way, the Latin copy is an exact replica of the exemplar. It was probably intended as a "crib" for those trying to read the Greek. There are spaces left for marginal and interlinear illustrations, but these were never filled in. In thirteen cases the captions were added, although they correspond to no images. It is possible that the illustrations went unfinished because the illustrator died. The artist can be identified by the historiated initial P at the start of the text and Lat. 4884 is his last known project. It may also be that the illustrations were never finished because the owner of the exemplar took it back. The owner of the Greek exemplar is identified on the first page as Bishop George of Amiens (r. 767–798), who was probably a Greek speaker from Italy and acquired his copy there before he gave, loaned or sold the manuscript to Corbie.

At the top of the first page of the Latin copy, there are competing attributions of authorship added by 9th-century scribes, one attributing the "chronicle" to George (now understood as the owner of the exemplar) and the other to Victor of Tunnuna. The latter attribution was an educated guess based on a monk's erroneous interpretation of the description of Victor's actual chronicle in Isidore of Seville's De viris illustribus. Nevertheless, the attribution was accepted. Two library catalogues from 11th- and 12th-century Corbie list "Victor's chronicle" among its holdings. By 1575, the manuscript had been acquired by Claude Dupuy.

== Related texts ==
Garstad sees the Excerpta as a transitional work between the bare Chronici canones of Eusebius and the fuller Chronographia of John Malalas.

The works most similar to the Excerpta are the Chronographia Golenischevensis and the Consularia Berolinensia. (Note: Burgess & Bell 2018 treat the fragmentary Consularia as a witness to the Greek text of the Excerpta, so great is the textual similarity, which Garstad 2012, p. xxiii, calls "a remarkable consistency". The name, Consularia Berolinensia, is proposed by Burgess & Dijkstra 2012, pp. 275–276.) While the Excerpta survives basically complete (if only in translation), the Chronographia and Consularia are fragmentary. Their illustrations, however, were completed. Structurally, the Chronographia contains the same three parts (based on the same sources) as the Excerpta, but it also includes additional texts. Both compilations probably drew on the same earlier compilation.

The Chronicon mundi Alexandrinum, the expanded version of the Liber generationis used by the compiler of the Excerpta, was also used by the authors of the 7th-century Chronicon Paschale, the 9th-century Anonymus Matritensis and the 10th-century Annales of Eutychius of Alexandria.

Walter Goffart, discussing the flow of Greek works to Italy or Merovingian Francia, where many were translated in the 6th or 7th century, includes the Excerpta alongside the Frankish Table of Nations, the Book of Synods, the Codex Encyclius, the ruler lists used in the Chronicle of Fredegar and the original model for the ioca monachorum collections. The appearance of a Greek text from the east and its translation into Latin in the west in what is traditionally considered the "Dark Ages" is not unprecedented.

== Bibliography ==
- Baldwin, Barry; Kazhdan, Alexander; Cutler, Anthony (1991). "Barbarus Scaligeri". In Kazhdan, Alexander (ed.). The Oxford Dictionary of Byzantium. Vol. 1. Oxford and New York: Oxford University Press. p. 253. ISBN 0-19-504652-8.
- Beatrice, Pier Franco, ed. (2001). Anonymi Monophysitae Theosophia: An Attempt at Reconstruction. Brill.
- Burgess, Richard W. (2000). "'Non duo Antonini sed duo Augusti': The Consuls of 161 and the Origins and Traditions of the Latin Consular Fasti of the Roman Empire". Zeitschrift für Papyrologie und Epigraphik. 132: 259–290. JSTOR 20190726.
- Burgess, Richard W. (2010). "Excerpta Latina Barbari [Barbarus Scaligeri]". In Graeme Dunphy (ed.). Encyclopedia of the Medieval Chronicle. Vol. 1. Brill. pp. 601–602.
- Burgess, Richard W. (2013). "The Date, Purpose, and Historical Context of the Original Greek and the Latin Translation of the so-called Excerpta Latina Barbari". Traditio. 68: 1–56. doi:10.1017/S0362152900001616.
- Burgess, Richard W. (2021). "The Origin and Evolution of Early Christian and Byzantine Universal Historiography". Millennium. 18 (1): 53–154. doi:10.1515/mill-2021-0004.
- Burgess, Richard W.; Bell, Peter (2018). "Chronographia Scaligeriana". In Nicholson, Oliver (ed.). The Oxford Dictionary of Late Antiquity, Volume 1: A–I. Oxford: Oxford University Press. p. 340. ISBN 978-0-19-881624-9.
- Burgess, Richard W.; Dijkstra, Jitse H. F. (2012). "The Berlin 'Chronicle' (P.Berol. inv. 13296): A New Edition of the Earliest Extant Late Antique Consularia". Archiv für Papyrusforschung. 58 (2): 273–301. doi:10.1515/apf.2013.58.2.273.
- Burgess, Richard W.; Dijkstra, Jitse H. F. (2013). "The 'Alexandrian World Chronicle', its Consularia and the Date of the Destruction of the Serapeum (with an Appendix on the List of Praefecti Augustales)". Millennium. 10 (1): 39–114. doi:10.1515/mjb.2013.10.1.39.
- Burgess, Richard W.; Kulikowski, Michael (2013). Mosaics of Time: The Latin Chronicle Traditions from the First Century BC to the Sixth Century AD. Vol. 1. Brepols.
- Cohen, Shaye J. D. (1981). "Sosates the Jewish Homer". Harvard Theological Review. 74 (4): 391–396. doi:10.1017/S0017816000030145.
- Dass, Nirmal (2013). "Review of Garstad 2012". The Medieval Review.
- Ganz, David (1990). Corbie in the Carolingian Renaissance. Jan Thorbecke Verlag.
- Garstad, Benjamin (2002). "The Excerpta Latina Barbari and the 'Picus-Zeus narrative'". Jahrbuch für Internationale Germanistik. 34 (1): 259–313.
- Garstad, Benjamin (2011). "Barbarian Interest in the Excerpta Latina Barbari". Early Medieval Europe. 19 (1): 3–42. doi:10.1111/j.1468-0254.2010.00310.x.
- Garstad, Benjamin, ed. (2012). Apocalypse of Pseudo-Methodius. An Alexandrian World Chronicle. Harvard University Press.
- Garstad, Benjamin (2016). "Nebuchadnezzar and Alexander in the Excerpta Latina Barbari". Iraq. 78: 25–48. doi:10.1017/irq.2015.8.
- Garstad, Benjamin (2018a). "Excerpta Latina Barbari". In David G. Hunter; Paul J. J. van Geest; Bert Jan Lietaert Peerbolte (eds.). Brill Encyclopedia of Early Christianity Online. Brill. doi:10.1163/2589-7993_EECO_SIM_036341.
- Garstad, Benjamin (2018b). "Alexander the Great's Liberation of Rome and an Idiosyncratic Model of World History in the Chronicle of John Malalas, the Excerpta Latina Barbari, and Fulgentius' De aetatibus". Wiener Studien. 131: 179–205. JSTOR 44841996.
- Goffart, Walter (1983). "The Supposedly 'Frankish' Table of Nations: An Edition and Study". Frühmittelalterliche Studien. 17 (1): 98–130. doi:10.1515/9783110242164.98.
- Metzger, Bruce M. (1970). "Names for the Nameless in the New Testament: A Study in the Growth of Christian Tradition". In Patrick Granfield; Joseph A. Jungmann (eds.). Kyriakon: Festschrift Johannes Quasten. Vol. 1. Aschendorff. pp. 79–99.
- Pollard, Richard Matthew (2013). "Review of Garstad 2012". Speculum. 88 (2): 515–517. JSTOR 23488871.
- Reimitz, Helmut (2019). "Pax Inter Utramque Gentem: The Merovingians, Byzantium and the History of Frankish Identity". In Stefan Esders; Yaniv Fox; Yitzhak Hen; Laury Sarti (eds.). East and West in the Early Middle Ages: The Merovingian Kingdoms in Mediterranean Perspective. Cambridge University Press. pp. 45–63. doi:10.1017/9781316941072.004.
