= Sex aetates mundi =

Sex aetates mundi may refer to

- Six Ages of the World, a medieval theory of historiography
- The Reckoning of Time, work by Bede containing a chronicle called De sex aetatibus
- Sex aetates mundi (Irish), a medieval Irish chronicle
