= Les sept âges du monde =

Illustrated manuscript

This image from the book depicts Adam and Eve in paradise; In heaven, God, seated on a throne, is surrounded by the choirs of angels and the circles of Creation. The different stages of Genesis are thus embraced in a single panorama, suggesting an instantaneousness of Creation according to the interpretation of Philo and Origen.

Les sept âges du monde (c. 1460) is an illustrated manuscript on the theme of the Seven ages of the world from the workshop of Jacques Pilavaine of Mons, now Brussels (Bibl. Roy., Ms. 9047). It was in the nineteenth century incorrectly attributed to Simon Marmion of Amiens.
