= Wilhelm von Bode =

German art historian (1845–1929)

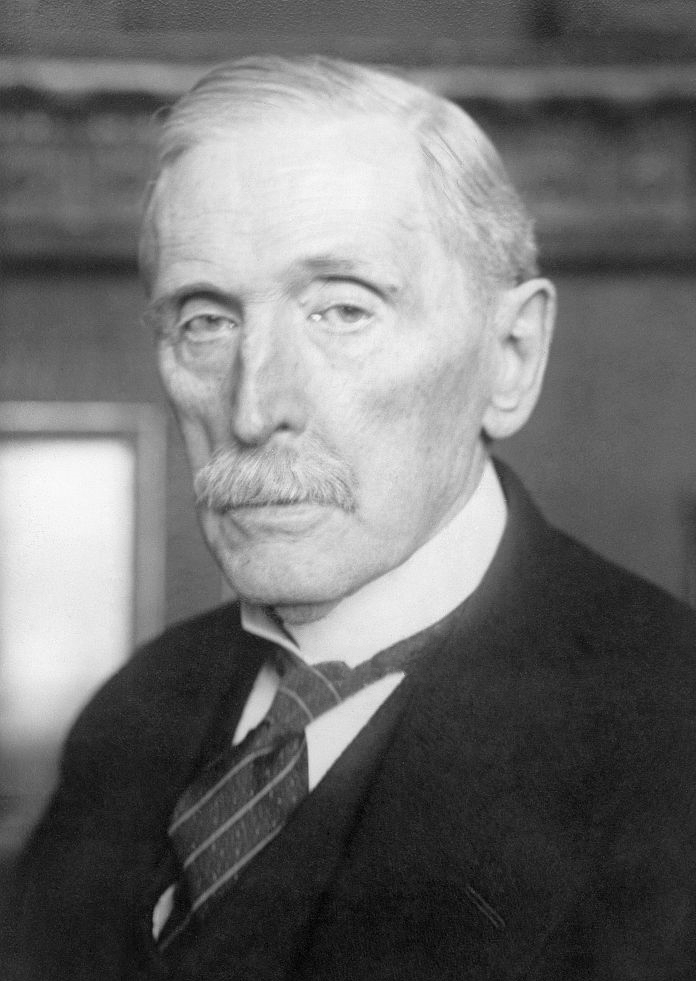
- Wilhelm von Bode c. 1920
- Born: 10 December 1845; Calvörde, Duchy of Brunswick
- Died: 1 March 1929 (aged 83); Berlin, Germany

Wilhelm von Bode (10 December 1845 – 1 March 1929) was a German art historian and museum curator. Born Arnold Wilhelm Bode in Calvörde, and known as Wilhelm Bode for most of his career, he was ennobled in 1913, and thereafter adopted the aristocratic "von". He was the creator and first curator of the Kaiser Friedrich Museum, now called the Bode Museum in his honor, in 1904.

He wrote a number of books, many large and authoritative studies of the art of the Italian Renaissance and the Dutch and Flemish Baroque, but also other subjects.

== Career ==
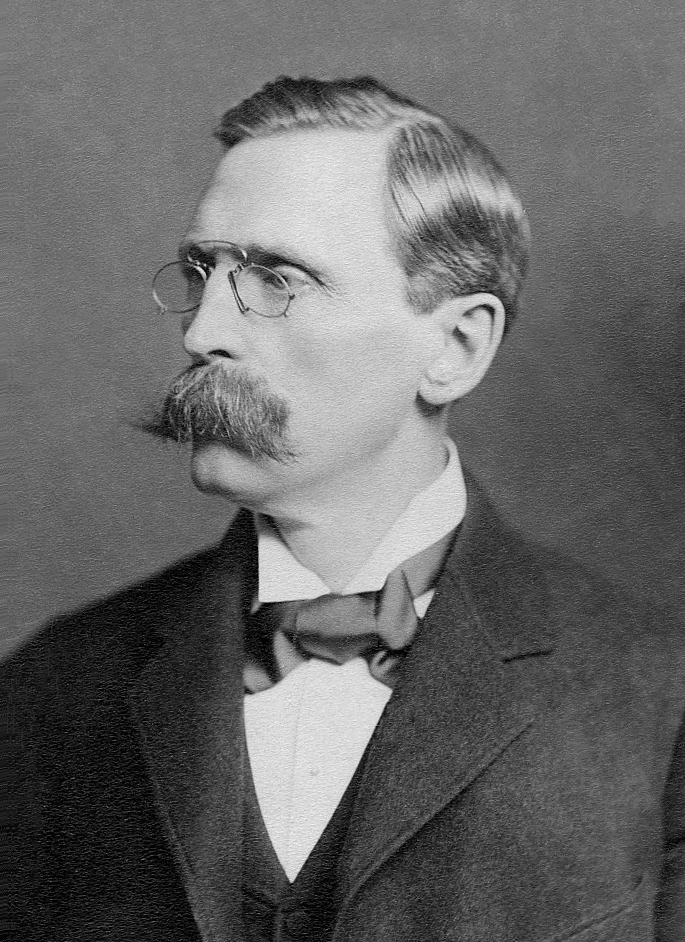
Wilhelm Bode in 1901

Bode studied law at the Universities of Göttingen and Berlin, but took an interest in art during his university years. While practicing law in Braunschweig he systematically rearranged the ducal art collections, and visited a number of museums and private collections in Belgium, the Netherlands, and Italy. After studies in art history in Berlin and Vienna, he received his doctorate from the University of Leipzig in 1870 based on his dissertation Frans Hals und seine Schule.

In 1871 Bode participated in the so-called "Holbein convention" in Dresden, at which a number of prominent art historians convened to determine which of two versions of Hans Holbein the Younger's Meyer Madonna was the original work.

In 1872 he took a position as an assistant curator of sculpture in the royal museums in Berlin, and became director of the department in 1883. He took over the Gemäldegalerie in 1890, and became general director of what is now the Berlin State Museums in 1905, succeeding Richard Schöne. Many of his efforts were devoted to the new Kaiser Friedrich Museum on Museum Island; his close relationship with the imperial family, his political astuteness, and his relationships with artists and collectors throughout Europe enabled to amass a major collection for the museum. In the 1890s Berlin was far behind Munich and Dresden in its art collections, but with the enthusiastic participation of Wilhelm II, Bode was able to shift the center of the German art world to the capital. He was also in charge of rebuilding the museums of Strasbourg, whose collections had been entirely destroyed in 1870 by Prussian bombardments during the Franco-Prussian War. Bode occupied this post from 1889 to 1914, establishing the Musée des Beaux-Arts and the Cabinet des estampes et des dessins as well as setting the grounds of part of the current Musée de l’Œuvre Notre-Dame's collections.

Bode's writings on a wide variety of topics in art history, particularly Italian Renaissance art, were widely influential, and remain key texts in the field. His autobiography, Mein Leben, was published posthumously in 1930.

== The "Flora" bust ==
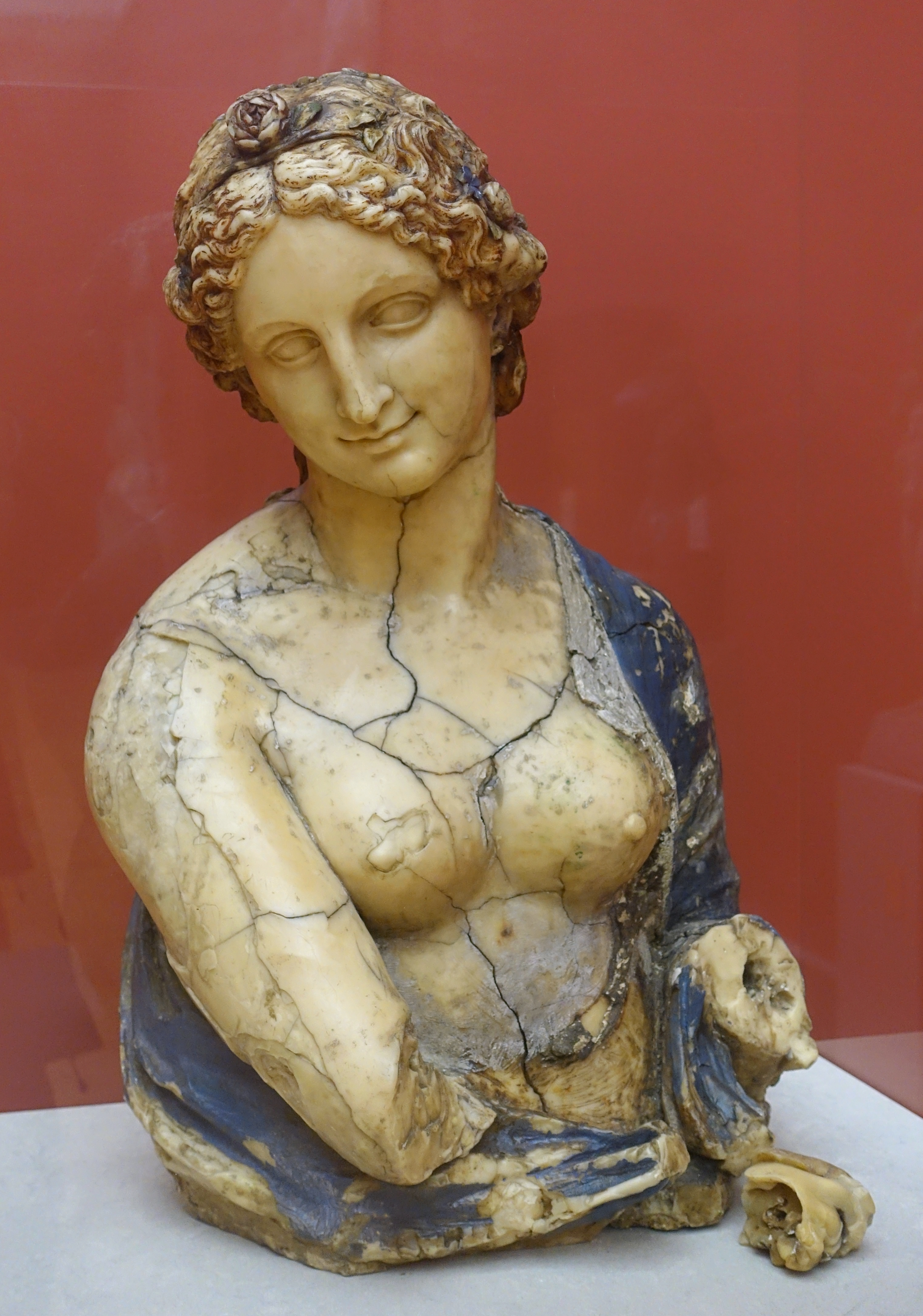
Bust of Flora by Richard Cockle Lucas

In 1910, it was revealed that a bust of Flora, which had been purchased by the Kaiser Friedrich Museum, Berlin, under the belief that it was by Leonardo da Vinci, may have actually been created by the English sculptor, Richard Cockle Lucas. Bode, the general manager of the Prussian Art Collections for the Berlin Museum, had spotted the bust in a London gallery and purchased it for a few pounds. Bode was convinced that the bust was by Leonardo and the Berlin Museum authorities, and the German public, were delighted to have "snatched a great art treasure from under the very noses" of the British art world.

Shortly afterwards, The Times ran an article claiming that the bust was the work of Lucas, having been commissioned to produce it from a painting. Lucas's son, Albert, then came forward and swore under oath that the story was correct and that he had helped his father to make it. Albert was able to explain how the layers of wax had been built up from old candle ends; he also described how his father would stuff various debris, including newspapers, inside the bust. When the Berlin museum staff removed the base they found the debris, just as Albert had described it, including a letter dated in the 1840s.

Despite this evidence, Bode continued to claim that his original attribution was correct. To support this, he displayed the Flora bust among a selection of Lucas's lesser work – this exhibition rather backfired, however, as it showed that Lucas had been regularly making wax sculptures inspired by the great works of previous times. Various claims and counter-claims have been put forward about the bust, from its being an outright forgery to being a genuine 16th-century piece (albeit not by Leonardo). In April 2021, the bust was dated using carbon-14, which confirmed that it was sculpted in the 19th century. The bust remains on display in what is now the Bode Museum labelled "England", "19th century" with a question mark.

== Major works ==
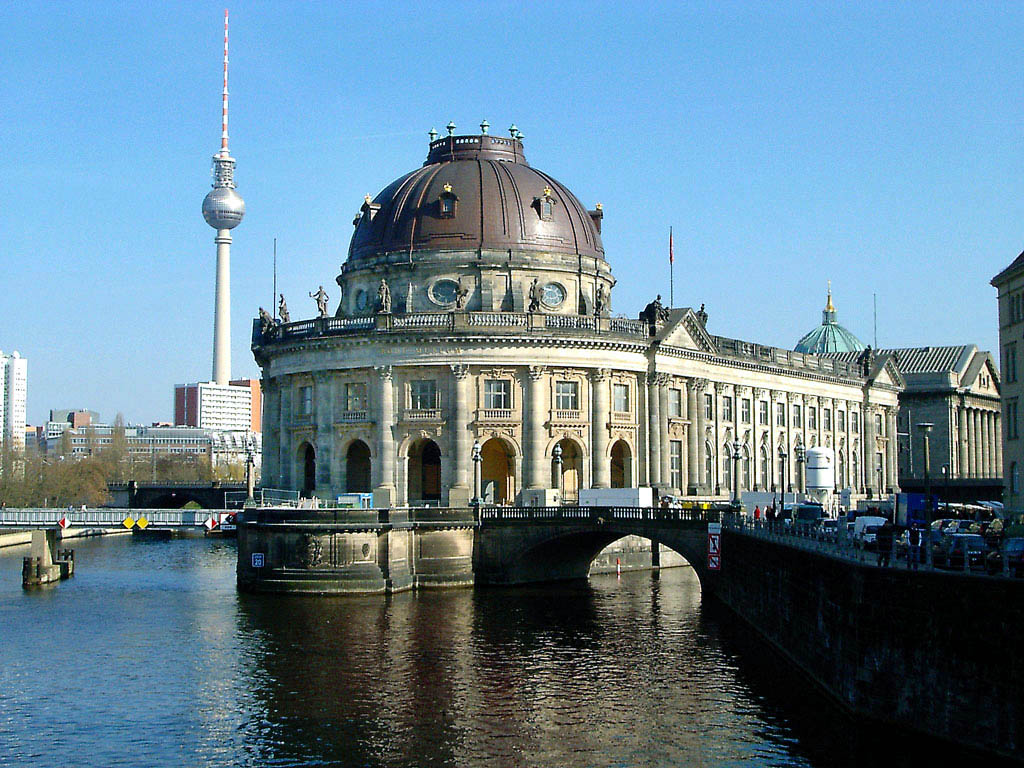
Bode Museum, Museum Island, Berlin.

- Vorderasiatische Knüpfteppiche aus älterer Zeit. Leipzig
- Studien zur Geschichte der hollandischen Malerei, Braunschweig, 1883
- Geschichte der deutschen Plastik, 1887
- Rembrandt, 8 volumes, with C. Hofstede de Groot, 1897–1905
- Der Cicerone: Eine Anleitung zum Genuss der Kunstwerke Italiens von Jacob Burckhardt. 1900– 1901
- Kunst und Kunstgewerbe am Ende des neunzehnten Jahrhunderts. Berlin, 1901.
- Florentiner Bildhauer der Renaissance, 1902.
- Die Meister der holländischen und vlämischen Malerschulen, 1917.
- Florentiner Bildhauer der Renaissance, 1921.
- Sandro Botticelli, 1921.
- Die italienischen Bronzestatuetten der Renaissance, 1922.
- Die italienische Plastik, 1922.
- Mein Leben, 2 volumes, 1930.

== Works in English translation ==
- Catalogue of the Collection of Pictures and Bronzes in the Possession of Mr. Otto Beit: Introduction and Descriptions by Dr. Wilhelm Bode, 1913.
- The Collection of Pictures of the Late Herr A. de Ridder in his Villa at Schönberg near Cronberg in the Taunus: Catalogued and Described by Wilhelm Bode, translated by Harry Virgin, 1913.
- Antique Rugs from the Near East, translated by R. M. Riefstahl, 1922.
- Sandro Botticelli, translated by F. Renfield and F. L. Rudston Brown, 1925.
- Florentine sculptors of the Renaissance, translated by Jessie Haynes, 1928.
