= Lebor Bretnach =

Lebor Bretnach, in modern orthography Leabhar Breathnach and sometimes known as the Irish Nennius, is an 11th-century historical work in Middle Irish, largely consisting of a translation of the Historia Brittonum. It may have originated in Scotland, although it has traditionally been attributed to the Irish poet Gilla Cóemáin.

== Manuscripts ==
Lebor Bretnach exists in five manuscripts:

- U. Dublin, Royal Irish Academy, MS 23 E 25 (1229). A 12th-century fragment in the Lebor na hUidre.
- B. Dublin, Royal Irish Academy, MS 23 P 12 (536). A 14th-century manuscript known as the Book of Ballymote.
- H. Dublin, Trinity College, MS H. 3. 17. Probably written in the 14th or early 15th century.
- M. Dublin, Royal Irish Academy, MS Stowe D ii 1. Known as the Book of Uí Maine, written before 1423.
- L. Dublin, Royal Irish Academy, MS 23 P 2 (535) and Dublin, Trinity College, MS H. 2. 17, Vol. 2 (1319). Known as the Book of Lecan, written c. 1417.

== Sources ==
Lebor Bretnach is a translation of a 9th-century historical collection purportedly written by Nennius, the Historia Brittonum, but not an entirely literal one. It only summarises the Historia Brittonum where that work deals with specifically Gaelic matters already familiar to scholars in Ireland and Scotland, and in some other passages it includes additional material taken from, for example, the Sex Aetates Mundi, Bede's Historia Ecclesiastica Gentis Anglorum, and a Pictish king-list.

== Authorship and date ==
In two manuscripts of Lebor Bretnach, H and M, the translation is ascribed to the poet Gilla Cóemáin (fl. 1071/2). This ascription is now in doubt, and the historian Thomas Owen Clancy has suggested that Lebor Bretnach was instead only intended to be dedicated to Gilla Cóemáin. Traditionally there had been an assumption that the translation had been an Irish work, but Clancy has argued for a Scottish provenance, suggesting an origin at Abernethy, though probably intended for an Irish readership that had perhaps become interested in Scottish literature and history as a result of the military success and prestige of the Kingdom of Alba. It is generally agreed that Lebor Bretnach dates to the mid or late 11th century.

== Editions ==
- Todd, James Henthorn, ed. (1848). Leabhar Breathnach Annso Sis: The Irish Version of the Historia Britonum of Nennius. Dublin: Irish Archaeological Society., HTML e-text at CELT : gaelic, english
- van Hamel, A. G., ed. (1937). Lebor Bretnach: The Irish Version of the Historia Britonum Ascribed to Nennius. Irish Manuscripts Commission, Volume 5. Dublin: Stationery Office.

== See also ==
- Nennius — a Welsh monk of the 9th century
- Frankish Table of Nations — a Latin source for the genealogies
