= Excerpta =

Excerpta (Latin for "excerpts") may refer to:

- Excerpta Barocciana, extracts from Late Antique church historians found in Codex Baroccianus 142
- Excerpta Constantiniana, 53-volume Greek anthology of excerpts from historians
- Excerpta Latina Barbari, 8th-century Latin translation of a 5th- or early 6th-century Greek chronicle
- Excerpta Sangallensia, extracts from a Late Antique fasti made by Walafrid Strabo in the 830s
- Excerpta Valesiana, compilation of two fragmentary Latin chronicles
