= Francio (disambiguation) =

Francio may be:

- Francus, eponymous founder of the Franks according to the Liber Historiae Francorum
- The Italian name of Francium
- The Esperanto name of France
