= Sosates =

Ancient Jewish poet from Alexandria

The singular notice of Sosates in the Excerpta manuscript in the middle two lines, using long s and insular g

Sosates was an Alexandrian Jew who wrote epic poetry in Greek and flourished during the 2nd or 1st century BC.

== Dating ==
Sosates is known from a single line in the Excerpta Latina Barbari, an 8th-century AD Latin translation of a lost Greek chronograph of the 6th century. It is preserved in a single manuscript also of the 8th century. It reads, "At this same time Sosates, the Jewish Homer, flourished in Alexandria" (Hisdem temporibus Sosates cognoscebatur ille Ebraicus Omirus in Alexandria). It is one of five literary historical notices placed within a list of pharaohs that is correlated with a list of Jewish high priests. The correlation, however, is erroneous, the dates of the pharaohs not lining up with those of the priests. Sosates thus lived either during the time of the high priests Simon Thassi (142–135 BC) and John Hyrcanus (135–104) or during the reign of the Pharaoh Ptolemy XII (80–51). Shaye Cohen leans towards the former. Richard Burgess, on the other hand, argues that the literary notices were originally added to the list of pharaohs and places Sosates in the reign of Ptolemy XII.

== Writings ==
No identifiable fragment of Sosates' poetry is preserved. The works of his near contemporaries, the 2nd-century BC Jewish poets Philo, Theodotus and Ezekiel, are only slightly better preserved. Fragments of their works are known only through quotation in the Praeparatio evangelica of Eusebius, which cites a lost work of Alexander Polyhistor. The dating of Sosates to the reign of Ptolemy XII precludes his mention by Polyhistor and thus explains his extreme obscurity. There is evidence that Bishop Athanasius of Alexandria (r. 328–373 AD) may have read Sosates. He cites the work of the European Sotades in critiquing the Thalia of Arius, but erroneously calls him "the Egyptian Sosates", which may indicate a confusion with the similarly named Jewish poet, whose works may still have been read in 4th-century Alexandria.

The only clue to the nature of Sosates' writings is his nickname, the "Jewish Homer". It implies that he wrote about Jewish history in Homeric Greek, in epic style and dactylic hexameters. He probably reworked some of the historical books of the Hebrew Bible, such as the Pentateuch, Heptateuch or Octateuch. There was a long tradition in both Greek and Latin, active down to the 6th century AD, of adapting biblical content to epic and tragic verse. Possibly, he wrote about the more recent Maccabean Revolt. The suggestion of Alfred Schöne that he wrote the Pseudo-Phocylidea can be dismissed, because the work is not Homeric.

== Bibliography ==
- Burgess, R. W. (2013). "Another Look at Sosates, The 'Jewish Homer'". Journal for the Study of Judaism. 44 (2): 195–217. doi:10.1163/15700631-12340371.
- Cohen, Shaye J. D. (1981). "Sosates the Jewish Homer". Harvard Theological Review. 74 (4): 391–396. doi:10.1017/S0017816000030145. S2CID 162405178.
- Garstad, Benjamin, ed. (2012). Apocalypse of Pseudo-Methodius: An Alexandrian World Chronicle. Harvard University Press.
- Fraser, Peter M. (1972). Ptolemaic Alexandria, II: Notes. Clarendon Press. ISBN 978-0-19-814278-2.
