= Frankish Table of Nations =

Early medieval genealogical text in Latin

Manuscript A: The St Gall copy with the text beginning Incipit generatio regum (in red) near the top of the left page.

The Frankish Table of Nations is a brief early medieval genealogical text in Latin giving the supposed relationship between thirteen nations descended from three brothers. The nations are the Ostrogoths, Visigoths, Vandals, Gepids, Saxons, Burgundians, Thuringians, Lombards, Bavarians, Romans, Bretons, Franks and Alamanni.

The Table is called "Frankish" after the origin of the surviving manuscript tradition, not the origin of the work itself. In structure it is similar to the "Table of Nations" in the Bible. Although it survives in over ten manuscripts, the only medieval work to make use of it was the 9th-century Historia Brittonum, which nonetheless assured it a wide diffusion. The Table itself is the oldest extant work to make use of the Germania, a 1st-century work of Tacitus. It is also the oldest work to mention the Bavarians.

The Table was probably composed in the Byzantine Empire, or possibly in the Ostrogothic Kingdom, around 520. It may have originally been written in Greek. Its author fit contemporary peoples, mostly Germanic, into a framework supplied by Tacitus. Later copyists frequently combined the text with lists of Roman and Frankish kings, which some modern editors have treated as integral parts of the text.

== Title ==
In 1851, Karl Müllenhoff assigned the text the name by which it is now generally known—Frankish Table of Nations, or fränkische Völkertafel—because he thought it was written from the perspective of a Frank of about the year 520. Georg Heinrich Pertz, in the first published notice of the text from 1824, called it Populorum Germanorum generatio ("generation of the peoples of the Germans"). Müllenhoff himself, in his edition of Tacitus' Germania, included it in an appendix as the Generatio regum et gentium ("generation of kings and peoples"). Bruno Krusch calls the addition to manuscript D containing the Table De gentilium et barbarorum generationibus ("on the generations of peoples and barbarians"). David Dumville, in an appendix to his edition of the Historia Brittonum, calls it the Genealogiae Gentium ("genealogies of nations"). Walter Goffart in his edition based on all surviving manuscripts places it under the title Generatio Gentium ("generation of peoples").

In three manuscripts the Table appears under a rubric (title). In manuscript A it is Incipit generatio regum ("[here] begins the generation of kings") and in B Item de regibus Romanorum ("furthermore on the kings of the Romans"). In M, it is Hieronymus in cronicis ("Jerome in chronicles"). This mystifying rubric suggests that the copyist saw a connection between the Table and the Chronicon of Jerome or something in that tradition. A chronicle falsely attributed to Jerome is found in manuscript F.

== Origins ==
=== Date ===
Müllenhoff dated the Table to around 520, while Krusch favoured the late 7th or early 8th century, since he believed that the list of Roman kings that accompanies the text in some manuscripts was an integral part of it and could not be earlier than the late Merovingian period. Modern scholarship accepts Müllenhoff's dating based on internal evidence. The Vandals and Gepids effectively ceased to exist after the conquest of their kingdoms in 534 and 567, respectively. The Thuringians and Burgundians were conquered by the Franks in 531 and 534, but are listed alongside the independent Lombards. The Lombards are an obscure people before their defeat of the Heruli in 510. The Bavarians likewise are not otherwise mentioned in any text before Jordanes' Getica in or shortly after 551. This suggests that the text was composed between 510 and 531. Krusch was correct, however, regarding the date of the Roman king list, which is a later addition.

=== Place ===
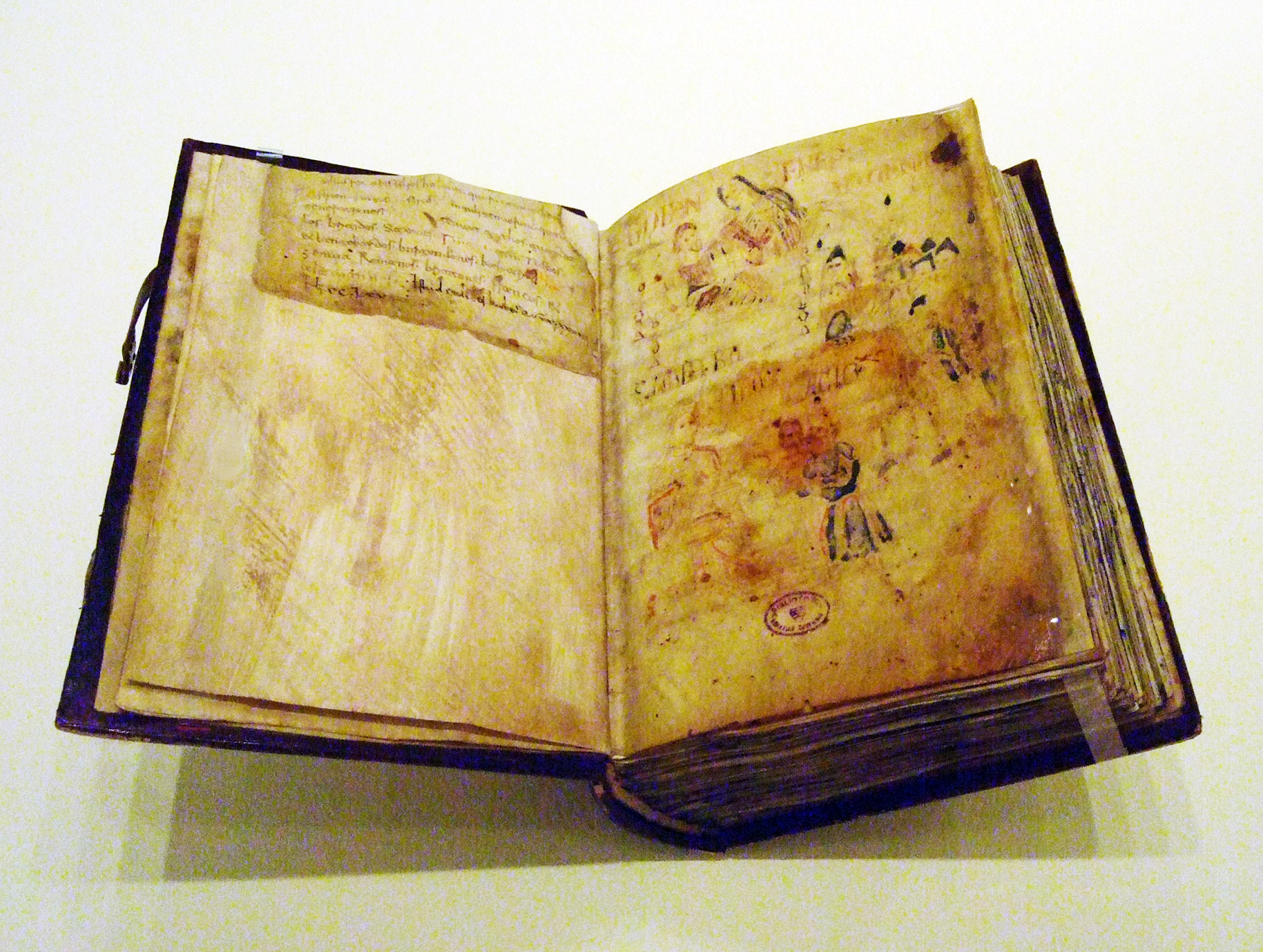
Manuscript E: the Table of Nations is on the short folio on the left. The first page of the Origo gentis Langobardorum is on the right.

The Frankish Table of Nations was composed either in Ostrogothic Italy or the Byzantine Empire. Goffart, its most recent editor, favours a Byzantine origin, as does Helmut Reimitz. Nicholas Evans favours an Italian origin.

The main argument in favour of an Italian origin is the use of the Germania of Tacitus. No surviving work earlier than this one made use of it, and the only other author to make use of it before the 9th century was Cassiodorus in Ostrogothic Italy. This is proof for the circulation of the Germania in Italy in the early 6th century. It is not known with certainty to have ever been available in the Byzantine Empire, although it may be quoted in the 7th-century Strategikon of Maurice.

The content of the text provides evidence of a Byzantine origin, and its purpose is readily related to the interest of the emperors Justin I and Justinian I in a restoration of Roman rule in the West in the 520s. It may even have been directly linked to the accession of either Justin in 518 or Justinian 527. For the time, a Byzantine origin is consistent with an original composition in either Latin or Greek.

=== Authorship ===
The author of the Table is unknown. Although there have been many past attempts to determine his ethnicity or nationality from internal evidence, the Table does not obviously glorify or denigrate any people in particular. Müllenhoff argued for the Frankish identity of the author and gave the Table its conventional name. Many arguments for a Frankish author would apply equally well to a Gothic one. Ferdinand Lot suggested that he was an Alan cleric.

Goffart argues that if the author was writing in Ostrogothic Italy he was probably a Roman and not a Goth (despite the fact that he does place the Goths first among the nations). Evans suggests he was an Ostrogoth. If writing in the Byzantine Empire, he was most likely a resident of Constantinople, the seat of power. In favour of the Byzantine hypothesis, Goffart argues that the Table represents "the ethnic panorama of the current West as seen from a metropolitan angle of vision".

== Manuscripts ==
=== Independent ===
Separate recensions of the Table are found in seven manuscripts. Six of these were assigned the sigla ABCDEF in the 19th century and the seventh is designated M:

- A. St Gall Stiftsbibliothek, 732 at folios 154–155.
  Written in Carolingian minuscule in the first third of the 9th century, not necessarily at the Abbey of Saint Gall. The codex also contains a copy of the Lex Alamannorum, a couple of religious tracts and several other chronological texts.
- B. Paris, Bibliothèque nationale de France, lat. 4628A at folio 5.
  Written in Carolingian minuscule in the 10th century at the Abbey of Saint Denis. It is a legal codex, including the Lex Salica and a Frankish king list. Two copies of this manuscript were made in the 15th century, Vaticanus Ottobonianus 3081 and Paris lat. 4631.
- C. Rome, Biblioteca Apostolica Vaticana, Vat. lat. 5001 at folio 140^{V}.
  Written in Gothic script around 1300, probably at Salerno. It was copied from an exemplar in Beneventan script, possibly one made under the direction of Abbot Desiderius of Monte Cassino (1058–1086), as argued by Ludwig Bethmann, or perhaps earlier (c. 974), still in southern Italy. There are several copies of Vat. lat. 5001, including Vat. lat. 5000. The manuscript's other contents have a south Italian focus and are historical and legal in nature, including the Chronicon Salernitanum and the chronicle of Erchempert.
- D. Paris, Bibliothèque nationale de France, lat. 609 at folio 28^{V}.
  This small and well-used manuscript was written in Visigothic script in the early 9th century, but the Table was added in a different but non-French hand to a blank folio in the 10th or 11th century. The original content is computus, but the Table was added as part of some joca monachorum. This manuscript was once held by the Abbey of Saint Martial, Limoges. Goffart provides an edition of the joca at the end of his edition of the Table.
- E. La Cava, Archivio della Badia della Santissima Trinità, 4 (22) at folio 1.
  Written in Beneventan script around 1005, probably in Benevento. This is the Codex legum Langobardorum, a famous illustrated manuscript of the Origo gentis Langobardorum and Edictum Rothari in which the Table was inserted after completion before the first folio, although probably by the original compilers. The hand of the insert appears to match that of the last quire.
- F. Karlsruhe, Badische Landesbibliothek, Reichenau CCXXIX (Codex Augiensis 229) at folio 184.
  Written in an Italian hand in the early 9th century. The manuscript seems to have been completed in Italy after 821, which date appears in it, and probably before 822, when it appears to have been catalogued in the library of the Abbey of Reichenau. It contains an apparent reference to the destruction of the town of Chieti in 801 and another town in 805 during the war between King Pippin of Italy and Prince Grimoald III of Benevento, which has been taken to indicate an origin in Abruzzo. Material in Carolingian minuscule was added later, probably at Reichenau. It contains computistic, chronological, theological and grammatical texts, including several works by Isidore of Seville, a chronicle falsely attributed to Jerome and a world map.
- M. Monte Cassino, Archivio della Badia, 384 at folio 136.
  Written in Beneventan script in the early 10th century with some slightly later additions. It is part of a florilegium of otherwise classical and patristic writings and Alcuin. The letter M comes from the first letter in its version of the Table, which begins Mulius rex...

The manuscripts can be grouped by origin, with ABCD originating north of the Alps and EMF originating in Italy. AB and EMF appear to derive from a common source. In their treatment of the Table of Nations, the manuscripts can be grouped in several other ways. ACDEF treat it as filler, unconnected to the rest of their contents, while only BM integrate it fully. It is found with historical texts in A, legal texts in BCE and sacred texts in DFM. The texts of the Table in E and M are identical, probably because M was the model for E. According to Walter Pohl, the manuscripts CEM are all the product of a strategy of identity-building at Monte Cassino.

=== Historia Brittonum ===
The Table as it appears in the Historia in Harley MS 3859 The red A begins Ab Hisitione autem orte sunt quattuor gentes..., "From Istio were sprung four peoples..."

The Table was incorporated into the Historia Brittonum (written c. 830), where it is fully integrated into a series of genealogical texts. It follows the generations of Noah from Genesis, of which the Table itself may be an imitation, and is followed by a genealogy tracing the three brothers' descent from Adam. As in EMF, in the Historia Brittonum the main genealogy is connected to a single royal Roman progenitor.

The version of the Table in the Historia is related to that in F and derives ultimately from an Italian version. The Table can be found in §§13–16 of the Harleian recension of the Historia, §7 of the Vatican recension, ch. 13 of the Sawley recension and §9 of the Chartres manuscript. In the manuscript Harley 3859 copied around 1100, which includes the Table, the Historia is interpolated by a 10th-century set of Welsh genealogies.

The Historia is the only work prior to the 19th century to make actual use of the Table. A widely copied text, it ensured the Table a wide diffusion. There are three Gaelic versions of the Table derived from the Harleian Historia: in the Lebor Bretnach, a mid-11th-century translation of the Historia; in one recension of the late 11th-century historical compilation Lebor Gabála Érenn; and in the 11th-century Middle Irish Sex aetates mundi. In the 12th century, Lambert of Saint-Omer incorporated the text of the Table from a copy of the Historia into his encyclopaedic Liber Floridus. Another 12th-century writer, Geoffrey of Monmouth, was also influenced by the genealogical material in the Historia, including the Frankish Table.

== Transmission ==
The Table was probably brought to the Frankish kingdom in the 6th or 7th century. If originally in Greek, it probably received its translation there. The Excerpta latina barbari is another originally Greek work that travelled west and survives only in a Latin translation made in the Merovingian kingdom. The reign of Theudebert I (533–548) and the later 6th century were both periods of intense Frankish–Byzantine diplomacy that may have resulted in the transmission of texts such as these.

All surviving copies of the Table derive from a Frankish copy made probably in the late 7th or 8th century. No surviving manuscript pre-dates the Carolingian period and two of the manuscripts (AB) originated in the Carolingian empire. Both place the Table between a list of Roman rulers and a list of Frankish rulers. Outside of the Frankish kingdom, the text circulated in Italy.

Two features common to all manuscripts are probably emendations by an early Frankish copyist: the introduction of the term Walagothi in place of an unknown original and the addition of the Saxons to the original list of twelve nations. The term Walagothi is a hapax legomenon, occurring nowhere else in literature. It consists of the prefix wala- (from proto-Germanic *walhaz), meaning foreign, and the name of the Goths. Such a construction implies the hand of a native Germanic speaker. The Saxons were far more prominent to an 8th-century Frank than a 6th-century Byzantine and they break the even division of twelve peoples into three groups. Nicholas Evans considers the hypothesis of later Frankish emendation unwarranted.

In every manuscript, the Frankish Table of Nations appears attached to other texts. In AB, the Table follows a list of Roman kings and precedes a list of Frankish kings; in C, it is followed by a list of Frankish and Bavarian lawgivers; in D, it comes as the answer to the last of eight questions in a joca monachorum; and in EMF, the main genealogy is connected to a single royal Roman progenitor. This demonstrates that the core text once circulated independently without any Roman kings or any father to the three brothers. Goffart's edition covers the Table itself and the additions.

== Text ==
=== Earliest attainable version ===
The Table circulated as what Léopold Genicot called a "living text" (texte vivant), a text in which every copy becomes a new edition and not merely a witness to the original. It is thus impossible to produce an Urtext (original version) from surviving witnesses. Goffart provides what he calls the "earliest attainable version", essentially a composite of what is common to all witnesses.

Tres fuerunt fratres, primus Erminus, secundus Inguo, tertius Istio. Inde adcreuerunt gentes XIII. Primus Erminus genuit Gothos, Walagothos, Wandalos, Gepedeos, et Saxones. Inguo genuit Burgundiones, Turingos, Langobardos, Baioarios. Istio genuit Romanes, Brittones, Francos, Alamannos.

Translation:

There were three brothers, first Erminus, second Inguo, third Istio. From them derive thirteen peoples. First Erminus brought forth the Goths, Foreign Goths, Vandals, Gepides and Saxons. Inguo brought forth the Burgundians, Thuringians, Lombards, Bavarians. Istio brought forth the Romans, British [or Bretons], Franks, Alamans.

=== Variations ===
The spelling in the manuscripts is erratic and follows no rule. Inguo may be spelled Tingus or Nigueo; Istio becomes Scius or Hostius; the Gepids are sometimes Brigidos or Cybedi; the Thuringians are Loringus or Taringi; in one the Goths and Walagoths become Butes and Gualangutos.

In manuscripts AB, the Table is preceded by a list of Roman kings that begins with a "first king of the Romans" (primus rex Romanorum) named Analeus (A) or Allanius (B). In F, Alaneus is the father of the three brothers, while in the Historia Alanus is the father and also the "first man who came to Europe" (primus homo uenit ad Europam) of the nation of Japheth, son of Noah. In EM, the father of the brothers is called King Mulius.

The Table contains what is probably the earliest reference to the Bavarians. The next reference to them is in the Getica from about 551. The spelling in the manuscripts can provide no evidence for the early spelling or pronunciation of the Bavarians' name. The spellings given are Baioarius (A), Baweros (B), Baioeros (C), Bawarios (D), Baioarios (EMF) and Boguarii or Bogari (in the Historia). Thomas Hodgkin took the Boguarii to be the Bulgarians.

Manuscript F departs most radically from the standard text. It changes the order of the brothers, placing Istio before Erminus and Inguo. The nations descended from Istio are the same, but Erminus' Vandals and Saxons are swapped with Inguo's Burgundians and Lombards. The same changes are found in the Historia. The other Italian versions, E and M, contain less drastic changes. The number of peoples is reduced to twelve by the elimination of the Vandals and the Thuringians are replaced by Tuscans to create a "more emphatically modernized catalogue of peoples".

Some copies of the Historia also change the Romans into Latins (Latini) and the Alamanni into Albani. The latter may be explained as the work of a Welsh copyist for whom m and b were interchangeable, but more probably reflects another modernization or updating of the Table to better reflect the reality known to a scribe working in northern Wales between 857 and 912, who would have been more familiar with the land and people of Alba (Scotland), a kingdom just forming at that time, than Alemannia. Patrich Wadden sets out tables displaying all the variations in the different recensions of the Historia and its Gaelic descendants.

== Analysis ==
The names of the three brothers are derived from the Germania of Tacitus. According to Tacitus, "the author of [the Germanic] race" was named Mannus and he had three sons who gave their names to the three major divisions of the Germani: the "people nearest Ocean" were called Ingaevones, "those of the centre" Herminones and "the remainder" Istvaeones. Mannus is not mentioned in the Table and the names given to the brothers are not found in Tacitus but are derived from the names he gives to the peoples. Müllenhoff once mooted that the Table was the work of a West Germanic compiler familiar with the same folk history—still thus a living tradition in the 6th century—which had informed Tacitus' account several hundred years earlier. He later abandoned this position and the Table is not now thought to have originated in such a milieu.

Thomas Hodgkin's presentation in tabular form of the Historia Brittonum's version of the Frankish Table of Nations

The thirteen nations selected for inclusion in the Table are contemporary with the author. The selection is not derived from Tacitus nor does it include any anachronistic names. If it is an attempt to list the Germanic peoples, then the author conceives of the Romans and Bretons as Germans. Possibly the author considered Germani to be synonymous with Westerners or Europeans, although the Vandals lived in Africa at the time.

The first two nations named—the Goths without any qualifier and the Walagoths, that is, foreign Goths—represent the Ostrogoths and the Visigoths. Most likely, the Ostrogoths are the first and the Visigoths the second. It is probable that a Germanic-speaking editor in the Frankish kingdom replaced the by then rare term Visigoths with a Germanic gloss. "Foreign" in this case means "Romance-speaking" and refers to the "romanized" Visigoths of Spain and southern Gaul. Herwig Wolfram glosses the term as "Roman Goths" and Wadden as "Welsh Goths".

The assignment of the contemporary nations to Tacitean categories was made on the basis of Tacitus' descriptions. The author of the Table took "those of the centre" to mean the most prominent and assigned the most prominent nations of his time to the first group, the Herminones. These, minus the Saxons, form a quartet common in Byzantine literature. Procopius in On the Wars defines the Goths, Vandals, Visigoths and Gepids as the "Gothic nations" that "all came originally from one tribe". The same quartet is also found in Cyril of Scythopolis' Life of Sabbas, written about 556. They were all Arian Christians and major enemies of the Byzantine Empire in the early 6th century. Besides the Table, Theophanes the Confessor (c. 800), Landolfus Sagax (c. 1000) and Nikephoros Kallistos (c. 1320) all preserve this quartet of nations from early Byzantine historiography. The Saxons are thought to be a later addition to the Table by a Frankish editor.

The second group, the Ingaevones, are those nearest the ocean, taken to be the nations north of Italy and east of Gaul. The remainder were the westernmost nations, a miscellany of Germanic and non-Germanic peoples that make up the third group. They represent the peoples of the Frankish kingdoms. It is possibly significant that the Table was composed shortly after the death of Clovis I (511), founder of the Merovingian Frankish kingdom when its continued cohesion was in question and its component peoples may have appeared more independent.

The use of the Table in the Carolingian Empire can be read as part of an effort to integrate Roman and Frankish history. There is a parallel between the placement of the Franks, Britons and Romans as brothers in the Table and the claims of each of those people to Trojan ancestry: the Romans through Aeneas, the Merovingians through Francus and the Britons through Brutus (Britto). The only copy of the Table that connects it directly with the Trojan claims, however, is that found in the Historia, which is also the only one that connects it with the generations of Noah.

The introduction of the Tuscans in place of the Thuringians first occurs in manuscript M from the early 10th century and was followed in E, written around 1005. The change has been linked to the creation of a distinct regional Tuscan identity after the fall of the Lombard Kingdom in 774. The copyist of E, who probably had both versions to choose from, chose the Tuscan version because enhanced contacts between the Lombard south of Italy and Tuscany in his day. Willa and Gemma, the daughters of Prince Landulf IV of Benevento and Capua (r. 981–982), married prominent members of the Tuscan families Aldobrandeschi and Cadolingi. E also includes the Capua Chronicle, which gives a starring role to Marquis Hugh of Tuscany for his intervention in Capua in 993 following the murder of Prince Landenulf II.

All versions of the Historia Brittonum interpose between the brothers and the nations invented names for the founding fathers of the nations, mimicking the decision of the original author of the Table to create names for the brothers based on the names of their peoples. The intervening layer reads:

Hessitio autem habuit filios quattuor: hi sunt Francus, Romanus, Britto, Albanus. Armenon autem habuit quinque filios: Gothus, Valagothus, Gebidus, Burgundus, Longobardus. Negue autem habuit tres filios: Wandalus, Saxo, Boguarus.

Translation:

Hessitio had four sons, Francus, Romanus, Britto and Albanus; Armenon had five sons, Gothus, Walagothus, Gepidus, Burgundus, Langobardus; Negue had three sons, Vandalus, Saxo, Bavarus.

Some versions have Alemannus instead of Albanus. The Gaelic versions of the Table derived from the Historia drop the nations entirely, retaining only the brothers and their sons. They also have Albanus. Scholars are divided on the intended referent of the Albani, the descendants of Albanus. A connection with the "Scythian" Albani of Asia, mentioned in the 7th-century Etymologies of Isidore, is possible but unlikely. A Scythian origin for the Picts of northern Britain was proposed by Bede in the 8th century, probably based on Isidore, and became the centerpiece of the 12th-century Cronica de origine antiquorum Pictorum. Chronological considerations also exclude reference to the Balkan Albanians. Dumville argues that the Italian city of Alba Longa, whose inhabitants are called Albani elsewhere in the Historia, is meant. This city had an important role in the legend of Rome's founding. Evans considers it most likely that the Albani are the people of Alba (Scotland) and that a Welsh scribe updated the Table in the same way that a contemporary Italian scribe did: by replacing a more distant and less relevant people with one closer to home. It is less likely that the Albani are the inhabitants of Albion (Britain), since in that case they would be redundant to the Britti. The Gaelic version of the Lebor Gabála Érenn, however, specifies that Albanus' brother founded Alba Letha ("Albania on the Continent") and its author probably had in mind either Scythian Albania or Alba Longa. Edward Cowan translates it "Albanians of Latium in Italy". The Sex aetates mundi is even clearer: the Albani are from "the eastern Albania in great Asia" (ind Albain airtherach isind Asia móir).

== Bibliography ==
- Brugger, Ernst (1928). "Almain and Ermonie as Tristan's Home (continued)". Modern Philology. 26 (1): 1–12. doi:10.1086/387738. JSTOR 433567. S2CID 161296795.
- Cowan, Edward J. (1984). "Myth and Identity in Early Medieval Scotland". The Scottish Historical Review. 63 (176): 111–135.
- Dumville, David (1975). The Textual History of the Welsh–Latin Historia Brittonum (PhD dissertation). University of Edinburgh.
- Evans, Nicholas J. (2015). "Cultural Contacts and Ethnic Origins in Viking Age Wales and Northern Britain: The Case of Albanus, Britain's First Inhabitant and Scottish Ancestor" (PDF). Journal of Medieval History. 41 (2): 131–154. doi:10.1080/03044181.2015.1030438. S2CID 154125108.
- Fraser, James E. (2011). "From Ancient Scythia to The Problem of the Picts: Thoughts on the Quest for Pictish Origins". In Stephen T. Driscoll; Jane Geddes; Mark A. Hall (eds.). Pictish Progress: New Studies on Northern Britain in the Early Middle Ages. Brill. pp. 15–43.
- Friedrich, Johann (1910). "Die sogenannte fränkische Völkertafel". Sitzungsberichte der Münchener Akademie der Wissenschaften. 11: 1–27.
- Garstad, Benjamin (2011). "Barbarian interest in the Excerpta Latina Barbari". Early Medieval Europe. 19 (1): 3–42. doi:10.1111/j.1468-0254.2010.00310.x. S2CID 161831260.
- Goffart, Walter (1983). "The Supposedly 'Frankish' Table of Nations: An Edition and Study". Frühmittelalterliche Studien. 17 (1): 98–130. doi:10.1515/9783110242164.98. S2CID 201734002. [Reprinted in Rome's Fall and After (Hambledon, 1989), pp. 133–166.]
- Hammer, Carl I. (2007). From Ducatus to Regnum: Ruling Bavaria under the Merovingians and Early Carolingians. Brepols.
- Hodgkin, Thomas (1902). "Origins of Barbarian History". Hermathena. 12 (28): 1–16. JSTOR 23036668.
- Jankulak, Karen (2010). Geoffrey of Monmouth. University of Wales Press.
- Müllenhoff, Karl (1873). "Generatio regum et gentium". Germania antiqua. Weidmannsche Buchhandlung. pp. 163–164.
- Pohl, Walter (1997). "Ethnic Names and Identities in the British Isles: A Comparative Perspective". In John Hines (ed.). The Anglo-Saxons from the Migration Period to the Eighth Century: An Ethnographic Perspective. Boydell Press. pp. 7–32.
- Pohl, Walter (2001). Werkstätte der Erinnerung: Montecassino und die Gestaltung der langobardischen Vergangenheit. Oldenbourg.
- Pohl, Walter (2003). "The Construction of Communities and the Persistence of Paradox: An Introduction". In R. Corradini; M. Diesenberger; H. Reimitz (eds.). The Construction of Communities in the Early Middle Ages: Texts, Resources and Artefacts. Brill. pp. 1–16. ISBN 9789004118621.
- Pohl, Walter (2016). "Genealogy: A Comparative Perspective from the Early Medieval West" (PDF). In Eirik Hovden; Christina Lutter; Walter Pohl (eds.). Meanings of Community across Medieval Eurasia: Comparative Approaches. Brill. pp. 232–269.
- Reimitz, Helmut (2015). History, Frankish Identity and the Framing of Western Ethnicity, 550–850. Cambridge University Press.
- Stoffella, Marco (2013). "Tuscans as gens? Shaping Local Identities and Communities in Early Medieval Tuscany". In Walter Pohl; Gerda Heydemann (eds.). Post-Roman Transitions: Christian and Barbarian Identities in the Early Medieval West. Cultural Encounters in Late Antiquity and the Middle Ages. Vol. 14. Brepols. pp. 271–295. doi:10.1484/M.CELAMA-EB.1.101667. ISBN 978-2-503-54327-7.
- Thornton, David E. (1998). "Orality, Literacy and Genealogy in Early Medieval Ireland and Wales". Literacy in Medieval Celtic Societies (PDF). pp. 83–98.
- Wadden, Patrick (2012). Theories of National Identity in Early Medieval Ireland (PhD dissertation). University of Oxford.
- Wadden, Patrick (2016). "The Frankish Table of Nations in Insular Historiography". Cambrian Medieval Celtic Studies. 72: 1–31.
- Wolfram, Herwig (1988). History of the Goths. University of California Press.
