= Translatio studii =

Historiographical concept

Translatio studii (Latin for "transfer of learning") is a historiographical concept which originated in the Middle Ages in which history is viewed as a linear succession of transfers of knowledge or learning from one geographical place and time to another. The concept is closely linked to translatio imperii, which similarly describes the movement of imperial dominance. Both terms are thought to have their origins in the second chapter of the Book of Daniel in the Hebrew Bible (verses 39–40).

== History of the concept ==
Translatio studii is a celebrated topos in medieval literature, most notably articulated in the prologue to Chrétien de Troyes's Cligès, composed ca. 1170. There, Chrétien explains that Greece was first the seat of all knowledge, then it came to Rome, and now it has come to France, where, by the grace of God, it shall remain forevermore.

In the Renaissance and later, historians saw the metaphorical light of learning as moving much as the light of the sun did: westward. According to this notion, the first center of learning was Eden, followed by Jerusalem, and Babylon. From there, the light of learning moved westward to Athens, and then west to Rome. After Rome, learning moved west to Paris. From there, enlightenment purportedly moved west to London, though other nations laid claim to the mantle, most notably Russia, which would involve a retrograde motion and rupture in the westerly direction. The metaphor of translatio studii went out of fashion in the 18th century, but such English Renaissance authors as George Herbert were already predicting that learning would move next to America.

A pessimistic corollary metaphor is the translatio stultitiae ["transfer of stupidity"]. As learning moves west, as the earth turns and light falls ever westward, so night follows and claims the places learning has departed from. The metaphor of the translatio stultitiae informs Alexander Pope's Dunciad, and particularly book IV of the Greater Dunciad of 1741, which opens with the nihilistic invocation:

Yet, yet a moment, one dim Ray of Light
Indulge, dread Chaos, and eternal Night!" (B IV 1-2)

[...]

Suspend a while your Force inertly strong,
Then take at once the Poet, and the Song. (ibid. 7-8)

== Etymology ==
While the term translatio studii literally means in English the translation of studies, there is an implication within the concept that the transmission of learning also carried with it cultural ideals and information. That being said, there is a lot more to translatio studii than the simple movement of common concepts from the Mediterranean westward.

According to Karlheinz Stierle, English is what we might consider the current language of this sort of transmission, but "what English is today...Latin was in the first centuries after Christ." In the way that politics and social issues move circulate around the world very often in English, these same concepts traveled along the developing roads from Greece and Italy to England during medieval times. As religion spread from Rome to Londinium (or present day Britain) it brought with it other concepts that can still be seen in the Romance languages.

An interesting example of this is the term "translatio" itself. In Ancient times translatio in Latin meant both translation and transfer. As time went on, translatio was designated to only mean transmission and traductio took on the meaning of what we know as translation. This carried over to the developing Romance languages as time went on. The words translation in French and traslazione in Italian mean the displacement of physical objects, and these languages still use other words to mean "translation" in the English sense. In this way, it is clear that historically the significance of translatio studii concerns the transfer of ideas that hold cultural value.

== Translatio imperii ==
Translatio imperii often served as a precedent or coordinate to translatio studii. A transferral of rule assisted a transferral of culture, and vice versa: "The transferal of power also conveys the phoenix-like reestablishment of culture - as fictionalized in and transmitted by literature - which establishes each new imperial power as the new stronghold of the culturally elite."

As it is concerned with the progress of learning, translatio studii provides an overview of intellectual heritage. Although it may be considered from various angles (e.g., history, linguistics, and literature) the concept of translatio studii is fundamentally concerned with texts. "Reading, translating, commenting, interpreting, rewriting — all are common intertextual activities of the translatio studii."

Translatio studii is based on the assumption that human learning and the potential for human learning originated in Greece from whence it spread westward to Rome and then France.

Chrétien de Troyes, a French poet of the late 12th century, writes of translatio studii in the opening of Cligès:

Original French

Par les livres que nous avons
Les fez des anciiens savons
Et del siecle qui fu jadis.
Ce nos ont nostre livre apris,
Que Grece ot de chevalerie
Le premier los et de clergie.
Puis vint chevalerie a Rome
Et de la clergie la some,
Qui or est en France venue.
Deus doint qu'ele i soit retenue
Et que li leus li abelisse
Tant que ja mes de France n'isse.

Through the books which we have,
we know the deeds of the ancients
and of times long passed.
Our books have taught us that
Greece had the first fame
of chivalry and learning.
Then came chivalry to Rome,
and the sum of learning,
which now is come to France.
God grant that it remain there,
and that it find the place so pleasant
that it will never depart from France.

== Ancient Greek and Roman theatre ==
All Roman comedy stems from Greek New Comedy but rewritten in Latin with slight adjustments to local taste and the long, narrow stage of Roman theatre. It keeps the characteristics of conventional situations from domestic life and stock character-masks that were traditional in the Greek model.

Roman theatre in turn influenced theatre of the Renaissance. "The nine Greek-style tragedies of Seneca (c. 4 B.C.E. -65 C.E.) are especially noteworthy, partly because they were to have a more profound influence on Renaissance tragedians than their Greek originals." Conventions commonly associated with Renaissance tragedies, most popularly Shakespeare, that are owed to Seneca, are revenge tragedies, structure of five acts, use of elaborate speeches, soliloquies, and asides, violence and horror performed on stage (as opposed to Greek tragedies in which all such actions occurred off stage), and an interest in the human condition, morality of nobility, and the supernatural, specifically with its human connection.

Rome also used the Greek language as a model on which to aid the expansion of its power and secure a language for its empire. According to L. G. Kelly, author of The True Interpreter: A History of Translation Theory and Practice in the West (1979), "Western Europe owes its civilization to its translators."

== Anglo-Norman cortoisie and romanz ==
Cortoisie is a synthesis of the superiority of French knighthood and learning. As a new distinction of the French knight, cortoisie implies not only a new style of communication and mastery of language, but a new style of communicative attitude, especially when regarding women. From cortoisie comes courtly love, a highly disciplined, self-denying, and respectful social form. Ideally, in this form, the knight honors his lady as something sacred. This new ideal of love called for a new ideal of language, according to Chrétien, and so, translations from old, dead Latin into French, or romanz, began. It is this language that replaces Latin as a new and lasting period of high culture, and, in so doing, becomes the real language or medium of translatio studii.

== See also ==
- Hegel's Lectures on the Philosophy of History
- Great Conversation
