= Translatio imperii =

Linear succession of transfers of power

Translatio imperii (Latin for 'transfer of rule') is a historiographical concept that was prominent among medieval thinkers and intellectuals in Europe, but which originated from earlier concepts in antiquity. According to this concept, the notion of decline and fall of an empire is theoretically replaced by a natural succession from one empire to another. Translatio implies that an empire can metahistorically be transferred from hand to hand and place to place, from Troy to Romans and Greeks to Franks (both claiming to be Romans) and further on to Spain, and has therefore survived.

In classical antiquity, an authoritative user of this scheme was Virgil, who has been traditionally ranked as one of Rome's greatest poets. In his work Aeneid, which has been considered the national epic of ancient Rome, he linked the Rome in which he lived, reigned by its first emperor Caesar Augustus, with Troy. The discourse of translatio imperii may be traced from the ninth century to the fourteenth, and may be carried on into the sixteenth century or even further. In the Early modern period, the translatio scheme was used by many authors who wished to legitimate their new centre of power and to provide it with prestige. In Renaissance era-Florence, humanists wrote Latin poems fashioning their city as the new Rome, and members of the Medici family as Roman rulers.

More generally speaking, this concept views history as a linear succession of transfers of an imperium that invests supreme power in a singular ruler, an "emperor", or sometimes even several emperors (e.g. the Eastern Roman Empire and the Western Holy Roman Empire). The concept is closely linked to translatio studii, the geographic movement of learning. Both terms are thought to have their origins in the second chapter of the Book of Daniel in the Hebrew Bible (verses 39–40).

== Definitions ==
French historian Jacques Le Goff (1924–2014) described the translatio imperii concept as "typical" for the Middle Ages for several reasons:

- The idea of linearity of time and history was typical for the Middle Ages;
- The translatio imperii idea typically also neglected simultaneous developments in other parts of the world (of no importance to medieval Europeans);
- The translatio imperii idea didn't separate "divine" history from the history of "worldly power": medieval Europeans considered divine (supernatural) and material things as part of the same continuum, which was their reality. Also the causality of one reign necessarily leading to its successor was often detailed by the medieval chroniclers, and is seen as a typical medieval approach.

To be noted is that Le Goff in saying that, did refer to a very small group of rich and prosperous people living during the Middle Ages. For the largest part of the citizens, translatio imperii was unknown.

Different medieval high-class authors described the translatio imperii as a succession leaving the supreme power in the hands of the monarch ruling the region of the author's provenance:

- Adso of Montier-en-Der (French area, 10th century): Roman Empire → Carolingian Franks → Saxons
- Otto of Freising (living in German region, 1114–1158): Rome → Franks → Lombards → Germans
- Chrétien de Troyes (living in medieval France, 12th century): Greece → Rome → France
- Snorri Sturluson (Prose Edda Prologue, Iceland/Norway, c. 13th century): Troy → Thrúdheim, Thrace → Norway
- Alfonso X of Castile (General Estoria, Castile, 13th century): Abraham → Egypt → Greece → Rome → Franks → Holy Roman Empire (Note: Alfonso claimed the title during the Great Interregnum.)
- Alfonso X of Castile (Estoria de España, Castile, 13th century): Greece → Carthage → Rome → Barbarian tribes → Visigoths → Astur–Leónese monarchy
- Richard de Bury (England, 14th century): Athens → Rome → Paris → England
- Dante Alighieri (Florence, c. 1265 – 1321) was strongly influenced by Virgil, who linked Rome's Caesar Augustus with Troy, most notably his Divine Comedy, in which Virgil appears as the author's guide through Hell and Purgatory. Dante's use of the Florentine dialect for this work rather than Latin influenced the course of literary developments in Europe.
- The Laurentian poets (Florence, 15th century) were modelling Lorenzo de' Medici as a leader of Ancient Rome. This rhetorical process formed an important part of Medici propaganda, as it tried to legitimate and give prestige to his reign. The same propagandistic use of the translatio imperii scheme has been made on behalf of other late 15th-century rulers in Italy.
- Philotheus of Pskov (Moscow, third Rome, Rus', c. 1510): Rome → Constantinople → Moscow
- Ibrahim Pasha (Ottoman Empire, 1523–1536) Roman Empire → Eastern Roman Empire → Seljuk Empire → Sultanate of Rum → Ottoman Empire

Later, continued and reinterpreted by modern and contemporary movements and authors (some known examples):

- Fifth Monarchists (England, 17th century): Caldeans (Babylonians) → Persians → Macedonian Empire → Rome → England (and the British Empire later)
- António Vieira (Portugal, 17th century): Assyro-Caldeans (Babylonians) → Persians → Greeks → Romans → Portuguese Empire
- Fernando Pessoa (Portugal, 20th century): Greece → Rome → Christianity → Europe → Portugal

Medieval and Renaissance authors often linked this transfer of power by genealogically attaching a ruling family to an ancient Greek or Trojan hero; this schema was modeled on Virgil's use of Aeneas (a Trojan hero) as progenitor of the city of Rome in his Aeneid. Continuing with this tradition, the twelfth-century Anglo-Norman authors Geoffrey of Monmouth (in his Historia Regum Britanniae) and Wace (in his Brut) linked the founding of Britain to the arrival of Brutus of Troy, son of Aeneas.

In a similar way, the French Renaissance author Jean Lemaire de Belges (in his Les Illustrations de Gaule et Singularités de Troie) linked the founding of Celtic Gaul to the arrival of the Trojan Francus (i.e. Astyanax), the son of Hector; and of Celtic Germany to the arrival of Bavo, the cousin of Priam; in this way he established an illustrious genealogy for Pepin and Charlemagne (the legend of Francus would also serve as the basis for Ronsard's epic poem, "La Franciade").

== From Troy to Rome ==
The Romans believed that they were descendants of Troy and this perceived genealogical connection meant a lot to them as it gave themselves a greater sense of legitimacy. A major aspect of the perceived connection and transfer from Troy to Rome comes from Virgil’s work, the Aeneid. Virgil uses the concept of translatio imperii and translatio studii in his work to blend history and mythology into the grand story of Rome’s origin. The Aeneid as a work demonstrates the concept of translatio imperii by showing the movement of power and culture from Troy to Rome via the titular character of Aeneas and his journey; which includes his prophesied destiny of founding a new kingdom in the Latium area following the Trojan war. The reasons for why the Romans so deeply valued their perceived connection to heroic tradition of Troy and Greece could have been because of their perceived “un-heroic” early history or because they desired to have a more impressive heroic past that would lend their nation more credence.

== From the Roman Empire/Byzantine Empire to the Holy Roman Empire ==
Famous and very successful was the use of the idea of the translatio imperii in establishing a link between the Western Roman Empire after its downfall in the fifth century, and the possessions ruled by Charlemagne between 768 and 814. Charlemagne was King of the Franks from 768 and King of the Lombards from 774 and negotiated an agreement with Pope Leo III to be crowned as Roman emperor in 800, reviving that title in Western Central Europe more than three centuries later. The title lapsed in 924, but was revived in 962 after negotiations between Otto I and Pope John XII, where Otto had his troops positioned near Rome. As a result, the Pope accepted Otto fashioning himself as Charlemagne's and the Carolingian Empire's successor, and beginning a continuous existence of the empire for over eight centuries. From 962 until the 12th century, the empire was one of the most powerful monarchies in Europe, as the Holy Roman Empire.

- Emperor Constantine I established Constantinople, a New Rome, as a second capital of the Roman Empire in 330.
- After the death of Emperor Theodosius I (347–395), the Roman Empire was permanently divided into the Western and the Eastern Roman Empire
- With the demise of the Western Empire in 476/480, the Byzantine Empire became the sole Roman Empire.
- Byzantine Emperor Constantine V married his son Leo IV to Irene of Athens on December 17, 768, brought to Constantinople by her father on November 1, 768. On January 14, 771, Irene gave birth to a son, Constantine. Following the deaths of Constantine V in 775 and Leo IV in 780, Irene became regent for their nine-year-old son, Constantine VI.
- As early as 781, Irene began to seek a closer relationship with the Carolingian dynasty and the Papacy. She negotiated a marriage between her son Constantine and Rotrude, a daughter of the ruling Frankish king, Charlemagne. Irene went as far as to send an official to instruct the Frankish princess in Greek; however, Irene herself broke off the engagement in 787, against her son's wishes.
- As Constantine VI approached maturity, the relationship between mother/regent and son/emperor was increasingly strained. In 797, Irene deposed her son, with his eyes being mutilated, who died before 805.
- Some Western authorities considered the Byzantine throne, now occupied by a woman, to be vacant and instead recognized that Charlemagne, who controlled Italy and much part of the former Western Roman Empire, had a valid claim to the imperial title. Pope Leo III, crowned Charlemagne as Roman Emperor in 800, an act not recognized by the Byzantine Empire.
- Irene is said to have endeavored to negotiate a marriage between herself and Charlemagne, but according to Theophanes the Confessor, who alone mentioned it, the scheme was frustrated by Aetios, one of her favorites. (Aetios was attempting to usurp power on behalf of his brother Leo.)
- In 802, Empress Irene was deposed by a conspiracy and replaced by Nikephoros I. She was exiled and died the following year.
- Pax Nicephori, a peace treaty in 803 between the Holy Roman Emperor Charlemagne and Nikephoros I, Basileus of the Eastern Roman Empire.
- Recognition of Charlemagne as Emperor (Basileus) in 812 by Emperor Michael I Rangabe of the Byzantine Empire (crowned on October 2, 811 by the Patriarch of Constantinople), after he reopened negotiations with the Franks. While acknowledging Charlemagne strictly as "Emperor", Michael only referred to himself as "Emperor of the Romans". In exchange for that recognition, Venice was returned to the Byzantine Empire.
- On February 2, 962, Otto I was solemnly crowned Holy Roman Emperor by Pope John XII. Ten days later at a Roman synod, Pope John XII, at Otto's desire, founded the Archbishopric of Magdeburg and the Bishopric of Merseburg, bestowed the pallium on the Archbishop of Salzburg and Archbishop of Trier, and confirmed the appointment of Rather as Bishop of Verona. The next day, the emperor issued a decree, the Diploma Ottonianum, in which he confirmed the Roman Church in its possessions, particularly those granted by the Donation of Pepin. On the other hand, the Pope had to accept that Otto and his heirs would have a vote in the nomination of popes as head of the Catholic Church and the Papal States, and he and his heirs had the position to overview the enforcement of law and order in the Papal states.
- On April 14, 972, Otto I married his son and heir Otto II to the Byzantine Princess Theophanu. Through their wedding contract, Otto was recognized as Emperor in the West, a title Theophanu later assumed together with her husband through the consortium imperii after his death.

== From the Inca Empire to the Spanish Empire ==
Sayri Túpac, second Inca of Vilcabamba, after negotiating with the viceroy Andrés Hurtado de Mendoza on January 5, 1558, in Lima ceded the rights of his crown to the King of Castile, renouncing his claims as sovereign of the Inca Empire and converting to Catholicism; in exchange, he received a pardon from the "superior government", obtained titles to land and income, recognition of the primogeniture of his lineage, and obtaining the Encomienda del Valle de Yucay [Mayorazgo de Oropesa]. Later, his successor Titu Cusi Yupanqui, would ratify this transfer with the signing of the treaty of Acobamba.

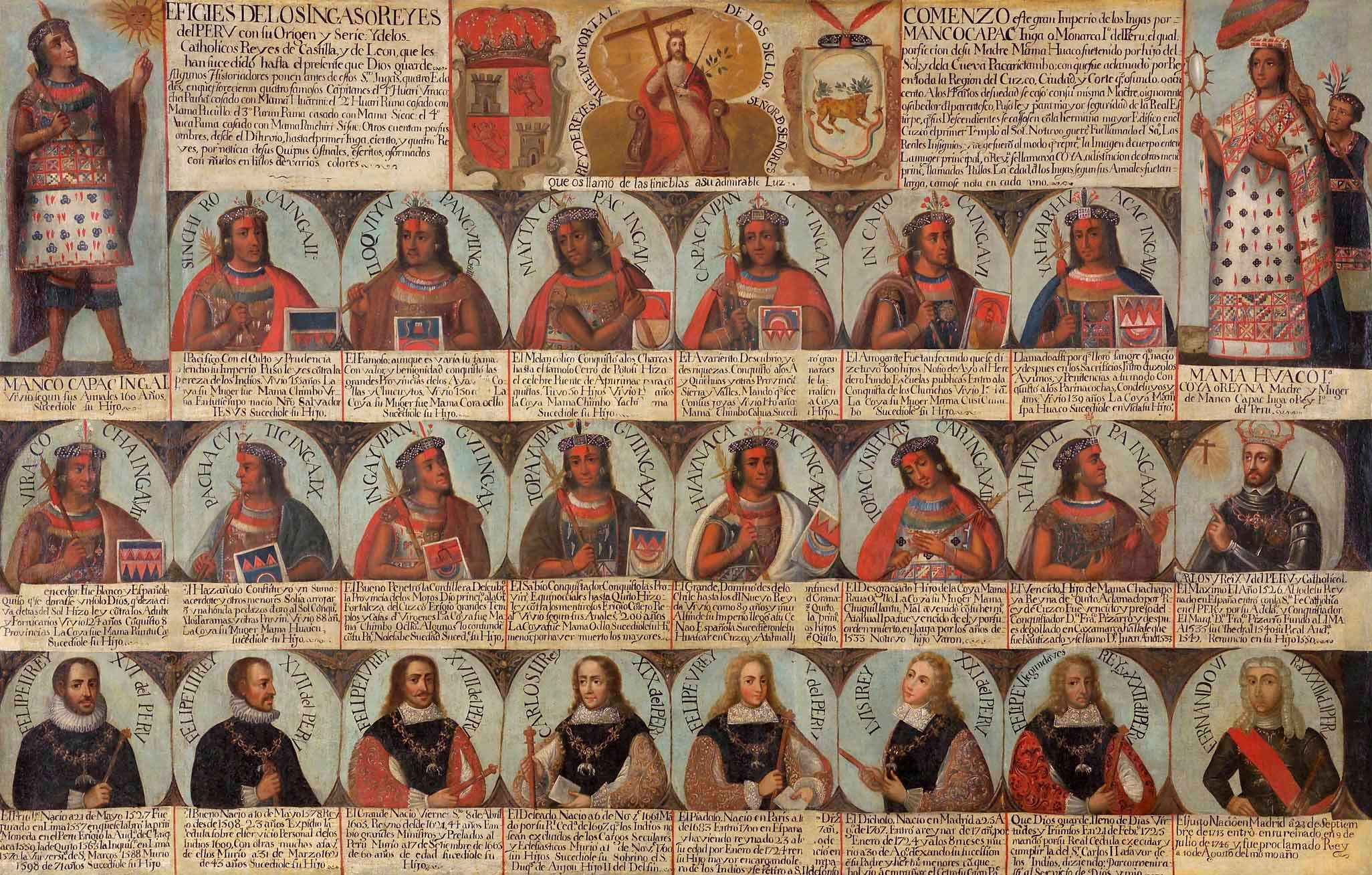
One of the Efigies de los incas o reyes del Perú, in which the Kings of Spain are portrayed as heirs to the rights of the Inca Emperors

This application of the Translatio Imperii, for the Kingdoms of Peru, was invoked as the legitimacy tool, by the Spanish Empire, for its domain in the Viceroyalty of Peru while, from these treaties, the incorporation of the Tahuantinsuyo in the Spanish Monarchy, with the official recognition of the Inca royal House, which consider the Monarchs of Spain as Kings of Peru, which would encourage the loyalty and fidelity of the Peruvian Monarchists (especially the royalists from the Royal Army of Peru) towards the Spanish monarchy and its promotion of mestizaje.

Given this, the Kings of Spain would be the legitimate successors of the Sapa Incas, therefore, Carlos I of Spain would be succeeding Atahualpa as Emperor of the Kingdoms of Peru, not only in fact, but also in law. This was referenced in multiple paintings of viceregal art (especially from the School of Cuzco and the Cathedral of Lima), such as the iconic Efigies de los incas o reyes del Perú, present in the Museum of Art of Lima, in which Atahualpa bestows his Scepter of Power to the Spanish Habsburgs (marked with a cross), or the painting by Juan Núñez Vela y Ribera, in the Copacabana monastery, where reference is made to the "poderosissimo Inga D. Carlos II Augustissimo Emperador de la América". Meanwhile, the King of Spain would flaunt his rights as Sapa Inca, through the title King of the West Indies, which is the sum of the rights of the Inca and Aztec crowns, which has been commemorated with the statues of the Aztec and Inca Emperors at the main entrance of the Royal Palace of Madrid.

This in turn gave guarantees to the Inca nobility to have recognition of their titles (and traditions of their peoples) in Spanish law, considering themselves twinned with the Spanish nobility, the indigenous nobility receiving multiple shields and privileges from the Crown. Authors like the Inca Garcilaso de la Vega would make a lot of reference to this Translatio imperii in his works.

The claims of Spanish rights in the Kingdoms of Peru is in this way: Pre-Inca Kingdoms and Andean civilizations → Incan Empire/Tahuantinsuyo → Christianity → Spanish Empire

== The Rus' land from the Middle Dnieper to Suzdalia ==
A long-standing problem in the historiography of the medieval history of Kievan Rus', Vladimir-Suzdal and Muscovy, preceding the modern republics of Russia and Ukraine, is when usage of the term "Rus' land" (Old East Slavic: ро́усьскаѧ землѧ́, romanized: rusĭskaę zemlę; Russian: Русская земля, romanized: Russkaia zemlia), which was initially associated with the Middle Dnieper (Dnipro) river valley around Kiev (modern Kyiv), shifted towards Vladimir-Suzdal, also known as "Suzdal land" or "Suzdalia". There is scholarly agreement that by the late 15th century, and perhaps earlier, the Daniilovichi princes of Moscow were presenting themselves as the legitimate dynastic successors to Kievan Rus', and the true representatives of the "Rus' land". The question is how much earlier this translatio can be dated, because the evidence is ambiguous. In 2016, Charles J. Halperin summarised the scholarly debate so far:

Application of the term "Rus" to Muscovy has always been a bone of contention, especially to Ukrainian historiography. Nasonov and others noted that in Kievan Rus' "Rus" originally meant the Dnieper (Dniepr', Dnipro) River triangle of Kyiv, Chernihiv, and Pereslavl', not Vladimir–Suzdal'. [...] Rus'" was not an ethnic term, it was a political term. By the late fourteenth century Rus' meant Moscow, Kolomna, and Serpukhov.

Several scholars previously used the 1950 Priselkov reconstruction of the Trinity Chronicle as evidence to date the translatio (variously from the 1320s to the mid-14th century), but – by 2001 – Halperin changed his position (confirmed in 2010 after Serhii Plokhy (2006) explored the question) due to the unreliability of Priselkov's reconstruction. In his 2022 updated bundle of all previous articles about the Rus' land (published at Plokhy's suggestion), Halperin posited that the last time "Rus' land" meant the region around Kiev was in c. 1240, when the Tale of the Destruction of the Rus' Land was written (probably in Kiev) during the Mongol invasion of Kievan Rus'. Conversely, by c. 1340, at the accession of Ivan I Kalita as Prince of Moscow in 1340, "the translatio of the Rus' Land to the Muscovite principality itself, or at the very least to the Northeast, was a fait accompli." Plokhy (2006) had argued this was too early, and the translatio could not have taken place before the mid-15th century due to Donald Ostrowski in 1998 re-dating of the works of the Kulikovo cycle to after the 1440s, which Halperin (1999) rejected. Instead, Plokhy suggested tracing it to the Muscovite Codex of 1472, wherein an entry sub anno 1471 "may be regarded as one of the first expressions of the translatio theory that postulated the transfer of power in the Rus' lands from Kyiv to Vladimir on the Kliazma and then to Moscow."

== See also ==
- Four kingdoms of Daniel
- Seljuk Empire
- Mandate of Heaven
  - Little China (ideology)
- Successor state

== Bibliography ==
- Halperin, Charles J. (2010). "Review Article. "National Identity in Premodern Rus'"". Russian History (Brill journal). 37 (3). Brill Publishers: 275–294. doi:10.1163/187633110X510446. Archived from the original on 26 March 2023. (review of Plokhy 2006, and a response to criticism)
- Halperin, Charles J. (17 February 2016). "A Tatar interpretation of the battle of Kulikovo Field, 1380: Rustam Nabiev". Nationalities Papers. 44 (1): 4–19. doi:10.1080/00905992.2015.1063594. ISSN 0090-5992. S2CID 129150302.
- Halperin, Charles J. (2022). The Rise and Demise of the Myth of the Rus' Land (PDF). Leeds: Arc Humanities Press. p. 107. ISBN 9781802700565. Archived from the original (PDF) on 23 June 2023.
- Kloss, Boris (Б. М. Клосс) (2012). О происхождении названия "Россия" [On the origin of the name "Russia"] (in Russian). Moscow: Litres. p. 152. ISBN 9785457558656. Archived from the original on 10 February 2023. (first published 2012 by Рукописные памятники Древней Руси [Manuscript monuments of ancient Rus'], Moscow).
- Oellig, Marie (2023). Die Sukzession von Weltreichen. Zu den antiken Wurzeln einer geschichtsmächtigen Idee. Oriens et Occidens. Vol. 38. Stuttgart: Franz Steiner. ISBN 978-3-515-13195-7.
- Plokhy, Serhii (2006). The Origins of the Slavic Nations: Premodern Identities in Russia, Ukraine, and Belarus (PDF). New York: Cambridge University Press. pp. 10–15. ISBN 978-0-521-86403-9. Archived (PDF) from the original on 6 June 2011.
