= Jacques Pilavaine =

Jacmart Pilavaine, also Jacques (fl. 1460s) was a miniaturist and manuscript illuminator of the 15th century. He was born in Péronne, then in Vermandois, and established his workshop at Mons, in Hainaut. Among his known surviving works is Les sept âges du monde, Brussels (Bibl. Roy., Ms. 9047).
