= Ioca monachorum =

The ioca (or joca) monachorum, meaning "monks' pastimes" or "monks' jokes", was a genre of short questions and answers for use by Christian monks. These were often on biblical subjects, but could also deal with literary, philosophical or historical matters. Although they could be straightforward, they were often riddles or jokes. They were probably used to stimulate thought and aid memory.

The genre originated in the Greek East but spread throughout Christendom. By the sixth century it had reached Gaul and the British Isles. Examples are known in Latin, German, Swedish, Occitan, Catalan and Castilian. It survived down to the end of the Middle Ages. It has modern a parallel in trivia games. Charles Wright gives as a modern American example of the same sort of riddle "Who first played tennis in the Bible? Moses served in Pharaoh's court".

A single iocus may appear in several manuscript collections. Although the answers were usually short, generally a single name, long answers were not unknown. The Frankish Table of Nations, a brief genealogy of the Germanic peoples, was the incorporated as the answer to a question in one collection of eight ioca. The Old Testament was an especially favoured topic. Questions about who in the Bible was first to do something were popular. The questioner and responder may or may not be identified in the text. The lines are usually prefaced with dic mihi (tell me), dico tibi (I tell you), interrogatio (question) or responsio (answer) and only in later dialogues discipulus (student) and magister (teacher). In one group of ioca, the names of the emperor Hadrian and the philosopher Epictetus are used for the interlocutors.

== Examples ==
- "Who died but was not born? Adam. Who was born but did not die? Elijah and Enoch".
- "Who killed Holofernes, leader of the army of King Nebuchadnezzar? Judith".
- "Who robbed his grandmother of her virginity? Cain the earth".
