= Lists of political office-holders in Greece =

These are lists of political office-holders in Greece.

== Mythology ==
- Kings of Thebes

== Antiquity ==
- Kings of Athens
- Archons of Athens
- Kings of Commagene
- Kings of Epirus
- Kings of Lydia
- Kings of Macedonia
- Attalid Kings of Pergamon
- Ptolemaic dynasty
- Seleucid dynasty
- Kings of Sparta
- Roman Emperors
- Ancient Greek tyrants

== Middle Ages ==
- Byzantine Emperors
- Emperors of Nicaea
- Emperors of Trebizond
- Despots of Epirus
- Despots of Morea
- Kings of Thessalonica
- Princes of Achaea
- Lords of Argos and Nauplia
- Dukes of the Archipelago
- Dukes of Athens
- Dukes of Neopatria
- Counts Palatine of Cephalonia and Zakynthos

== Post-Byzantine era ==
- Sultans of the Ottoman Empire
- Beys of Mani
- Lords High Commissioners of the Ionian Islands
- Princes of Samos

== Modern Greece ==
- List of kings of Greece
- List of heads of state of Greece
- List of Greek regents
- List of prime ministers of Greece
