= Shaye J. D. Cohen =

American rabbi and historian (born 1948)

Rabbi Shaye J. D. Cohen
- Born: October 21, 1948 (age 77)
- Citizenship: United States
- Occupations: Hebraist, historian, rabbi

Academic background
- Education: Yeshiva University; Jewish Theological Seminary; Columbia University

Academic work
- Discipline: Judaic studies
- Sub-discipline: Jewish history
- Institutions: Jewish Theological Seminary, Brown University, Harvard University

Shaye J. D. Cohen (born October 21, 1948) is an American Hebraist, historian, and rabbi. He is a modern scholar of the Hebrew Bible. Currently, he is the Littauer Professor of Hebrew Literature and Philosophy in the Department of Near Eastern Languages and Civilizations of Harvard University.

== Background and career ==
He received his undergraduate degree from Yeshiva University, his M.A. from the Jewish Theological Seminary, and his Ph.D. in Ancient History, with distinction, from Columbia University in 1975.

Cohen is an ordained Conservative rabbi and for many years was the Dean of the Graduate School and Shenkman Professor of Jewish History at the Jewish Theological Seminary in New York City. Before arriving at Harvard in July 2001, he was for ten years the Samuel Ungerleider Professor of Judaic Studies and Professor of Religious Studies at Brown University.

The focus of Cohen's research is the boundary between Jews and gentiles and between Judaism and its surrounding culture. He is also a published authority on Jewish reactions to Hellenism and to Christianity.

Cohen has received several honors for his work, including an honorary doctorate from the Jewish Theological Seminary and various fellowships. He has been honored by appointment as Croghan Distinguished Visiting professor of religion (Williams College), the Louis Jacobs Lecturer (Oxford University), the David M. Lewis Lecturer (Oxford University), Lady Davis Fellowship (Visiting professor) of Jewish History (Hebrew University of Jerusalem), the Block Lecturer (Indiana University), the Roland Visiting Lecturer (Stanford University) and the Pritchett Lecturer (University of California, Berkeley).

He appeared on a Nova episode as an expert on Jewish history. He also appears in PBS's Jesus to Christ Documentary.

Cohen has published many essays, co-authored many books, and written a number of books individually, including: Josephus in Galilee and Rome: His Vita and Development As a Historian (1979), From the Maccabees to the Mishnah (1988), The Beginnings of Jewishness: Boundaries, Varieties, Uncertainties (2001), Why Aren't Jewish Women Circumcised?: Gender and Covenant in Judaism (2005), and The Significance of Yavneh and Other Essays in Jewish Hellenism (2010).

== Published works ==
- Cohen, Shaye J. D., Josephus in Galilee and Rome: His Vita and Development As a Historian, Brill Academic Publishers, 2002. ISBN 978-0-391-04158-5
- Cohen, Shaye J. D., From the Maccabees to the Mishnah, Westminster John Knox Press, 1988. ISBN 0-664-25017-3
- Cohen, Shaye J. D. The Beginnings of Jewishness: Boundaries, Varieties, Uncertainties, University of California Press, 2001. ISBN 0-520-22693-3
- Cohen, Shaye J. D. Why Aren't Jewish Women Circumcised?: Gender and Covenant in Judaism, University of California Press, 2005. ISBN 978-0-520-21250-3
- Cohen, Shaye J. D. The Significance of Yavneh and Other Essays in Jewish Hellenism, Mohr Siebeck, 2010.ISBN 978-3-161-50375-7

== Awards ==
- 2006: National Jewish Book Award in the Women's Studies category for Why Aren't Jewish Women Circumcised?: Gender and Covenant in Judaism
