= Six Ages of the World =

Christian historical periodization from Late Antiquity

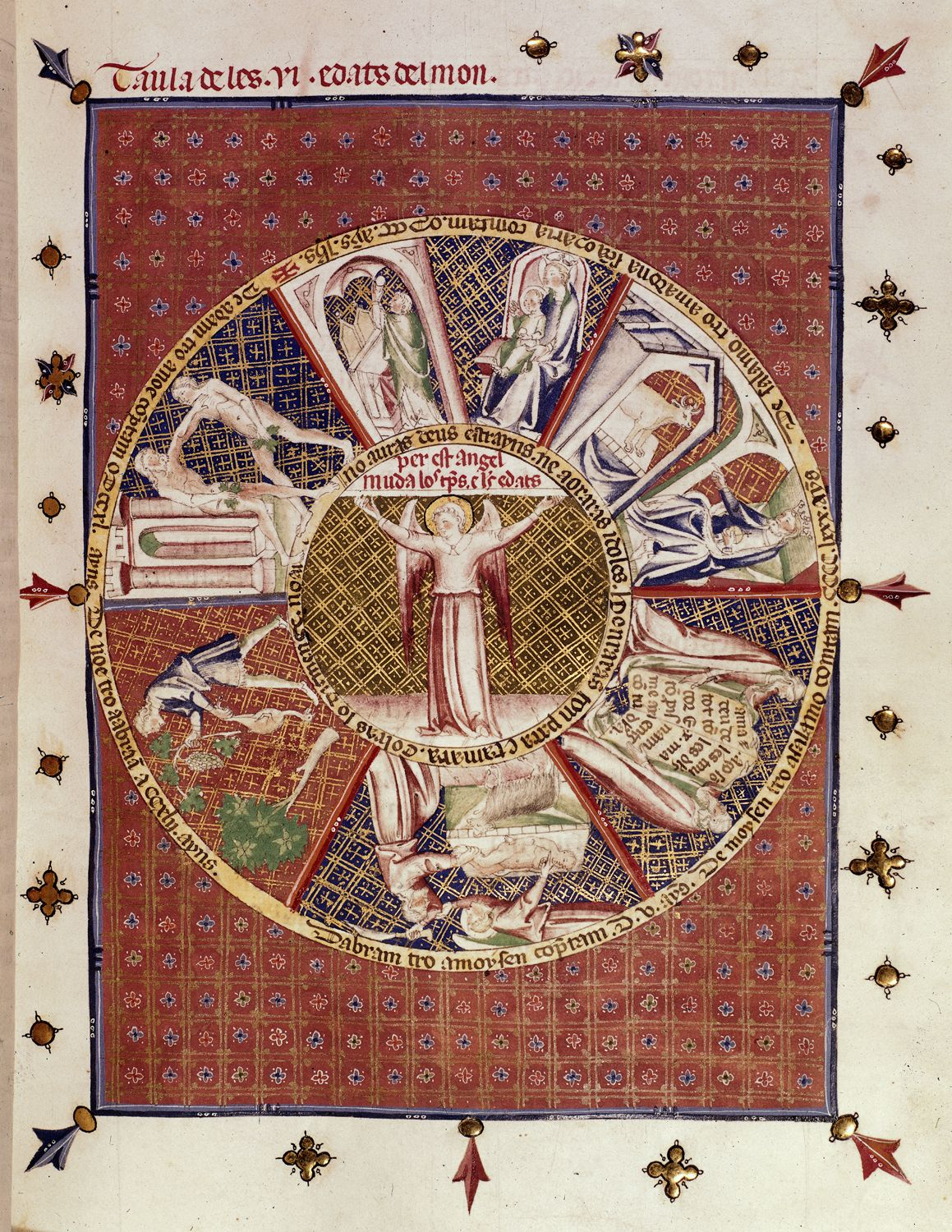
Six Ages of the World, from a Spanish manuscript

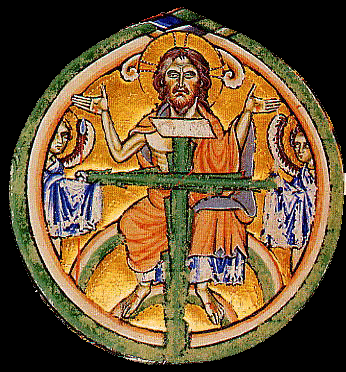
From the Winchester Bible, showing the seven ages within the opening letter "I" of the book of Genesis. This image is the final age, the Last Judgement. For images of the other six ages, see External links below.

The Six Ages of the World (Latin: sex aetates mundi), also rarely Seven Ages of the World (Latin: septem aetates mundi), is a Christian historical periodization first written about by Augustine of Hippo c. 400.

It is based upon Christian religious events, from the creation of Adam to the events of Revelation. The six ages of history, with each age (Latin: aetas) lasting approximately 1,000 years, were widely believed and in use throughout the Middle Ages, and until the Enlightenment, the writing of history was mostly the filling out of all or some part of this outline.

The outline accounts for Seven Ages, just as there are seven days of the week, with the Seventh Age being eternal rest after the Final Judgement and End Times, just as the seventh day of the week is reserved for rest. It was normally called the Six Ages of the World because in Augustine's schema they were the ages of the world, of history, while the Seventh Age was not of this world but, as Bede later elaborated, ran parallel to the six ages of the world. Augustine's presentation deliberately counters chiliastic and millennial ideas that the Seventh Age, World to Come, would come after the sixth.

== Six Ages ==
The Six Ages, as formulated by Augustine of Hippo, are defined in De catechizandis rudibus (On the catechizing of the uninstructed), Chapter 22:

- The First Age "is from the beginning of the human race, that is, from Adam, who was the first man that was made, down to Noah, who constructed the ark at the time of the flood", i.e. the Antediluvian period.
- The Second Age "extends from that period on to Abraham, who was called the father indeed of all nations".
- The Third Age "extends from Abraham on to David the king".
- The Fourth Age is "from David on to that captivity whereby the people of God passed over into Babylonia".
- The Fifth Age is "from that transmigration down to the advent of our Lord Jesus Christ"
- The Sixth Age: "With His [Jesus Christ's] coming the sixth age has entered on its process."

The Ages reflect the seven stages or phases (six "yom" in the original Hebrew texts, translated as six "days" (Note: A day is the period of time it takes for the Earth to complete one revolution on its axis (approximately 24 hours). However, in the first creation story the Earth is not created until the third stage of the process. The Earth therefore did not exist for the first two stages, so the concept of a day did not exist for the first two stages.) in English) of creation, of which the last phase is the rest of Sabbath, illustrating the human journey to find eternal rest with God, a common Christian belief.

== Kabbalistic tradition ==
There is a kabbalistic tradition that maintains that the seven phases of creation in Genesis 1 correspond to seven millennia of the existence of natural creation. The tradition teaches that the seventh day of the week, Shabbat or the day of rest, corresponds to the seventh millennium (Hebrew years 6000–7000), the age of universal "rest" – the Messianic Era.

The Talmud comments:

R. Katina said, "Six thousand years the world will exist and one [thousand, the seventh], it shall be desolate (haruv), as it is written, 'And the Lord alone shall be exalted in that day' (Isa. 2:11)" ... R. Katina also taught, "Just as the seventh year is the Shmita year, so too does the world have one thousand years out of seven that are fallow (mushmat), as it is written, 'And the Lord alone shall be exalted in that day' (Isa. 2:11); and further it is written, 'A psalm and song for the Shabbat day' (Ps. 92:1) – meaning the day that is altogether Shabbat – and also it is said, 'For a thousand years in Thy sight are but as yesterday when it is past' (Ps.90:4) (Sanhedrin 97a)."

The Midrash comments:

Six eons for going in and coming out, for war and peace. The seventh eon is entirely Shabbat and rest for life everlasting.

The Zohar explains:

The redemption of Israel will come about through the mystic force of the letter "Vav" [which has the numerical value of six], namely, in the sixth millennium. ... Happy are those who will be left alive at the end of the sixth millennium to enter the Shabbat, which is the seventh millennium; for that is a day set apart for the Holy One on which to effect the union of new souls with old souls in the world (Zohar, Vayera 119a).

Elaborating on this theme are numerous early and late Jewish scholars, including the Ramban, Isaac Abrabanel, Abraham Ibn Ezra, Rabbeinu Bachya, the Vilna Gaon, the Lubavitcher Rebbe, the Ramchal, Aryeh Kaplan, and Rebbetzin Esther Jungreis.

== Theory ==
The idea that each age lasts 1000 years is based on II Peter 3:8: "But of this one thing be not ignorant, my beloved, that one day with the Lord is as a thousand years, and a thousand years as one day." The interpretation was taken to mean that mankind would live through six 1,000 year periods (or "days"), with the seventh being eternity in heaven or according to the Nicene Creed, a World to Come.

Medieval Christian scholars believed it was possible to determine the overall time of human history, starting with Adam, by counting forward how long each generation had lived up to the time of Jesus, based on the ages recorded in the Bible. While the exact age of the earth was a matter of biblical interpretive debate, it was generally agreed man was somewhere in the last and final thousand years, the Sixth Age, and the final Seventh Age could happen at any time. The world was seen as an old place, with more time in its past than its future.

While Augustine was the first to write of the Six Ages, early Christians prior to Augustine found no end of evidence in the Jewish traditions of the Old Testament, and initially set the date for the End of the World at the year 500. Hippolytus said that the measurements of the Ark of the Covenant added up to five and one-half cubits, meaning five and a half thousand years. Since Jesus had been born in the "sixth hour", or halfway through a day (or, five hundred years into an Age), and since five kingdoms (five thousand years) had already fallen according to Revelation, plus the half day of Jesus (the body of Jesus replacing the Ark of the Jews), it meant that five-thousand five-hundred years had already passed when Jesus was born and another 500 years would mark the end of the world. An alternative scheme had set the date to the year 202, but when this date passed without event, people expected the end in the year 500.

By the 3rd century, Christians no longer widely believed the "End of the Ages" would occur in their lifetime, as was common among the earliest Christians.

== See also ==
- Bartholomew Holzhauser
- Dispensationalism
- Fifth Monarchists
- Four monarchies
- Generations of Noah
- Jewish mythology
- Nuremberg Chronicle
- Ussher chronology
- Sex aetates mundi (Irish)
- Three Eras
