= Sex aetates mundi (Irish) =

11th century Irish chronicle of Old Testament history

The Sex aetates mundi is an 11th-century short chronicle in Middle Irish which gives an overview of Old Testament history organized under the schema of the six ages of the world in alternating prose and verse. It is found in several manuscripts, including the Lebor na hUidre.

It draws in part on the 9th-century Latin Historia Brittonum, incorporating a version of the 6th-century "Frankish" Table of Nations that itself is derived from the 1st-century Germania of Tacitus.

== Editions ==
- Dáibhí Ó Cróinín (ed.), The Irish Sex Aetates Mundi, 1983.
