= Richard Schöne =

German archaeologist (1840–1922)

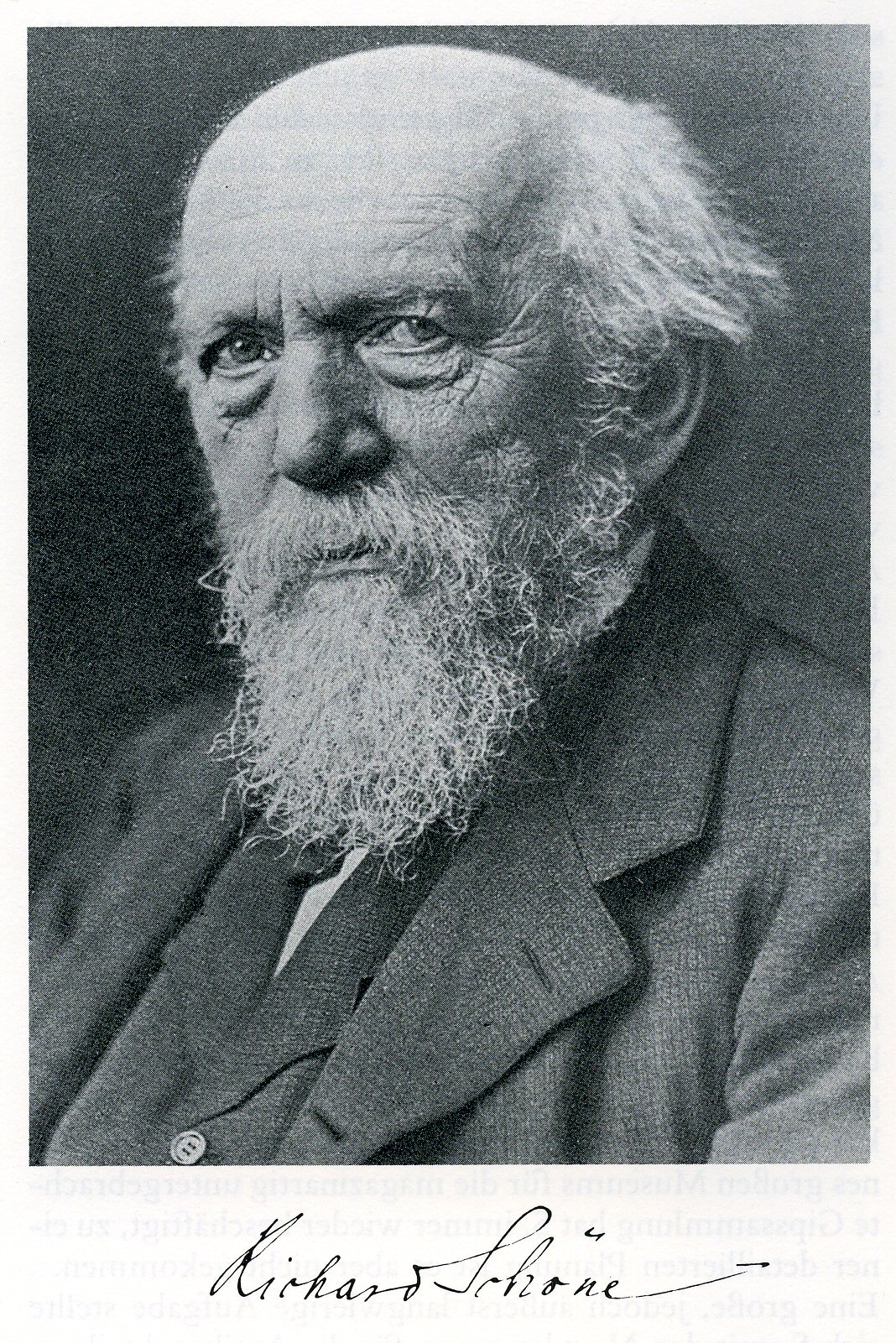
Richard Schöne

Richard Schöne (5 February 1840, in Dresden – 5 March 1922, in Berlin-Grunewald) was a German archaeologist and classical philologist.

He studied classical philology and archaeology at the University of Leipzig, receiving his doctorate in 1861 with a dissertation on Plato's Protagoras. He then studied painting under Friedrich Preller the Elder, and from 1864 conducted archaeological research in Italy, during which time, he visited numerous museums and libraries, and participated in excavations at Pompeii. In Rome, he worked alongside Otto Benndorf and Reinhard Kekulé von Stradonitz.

In 1868 he obtained his habilitation for archaeology with the thesis Quaestionum Pompeianarum specimen, and in 1869 became an associate professor of archaeology at the University of Halle. In 1872 he was named artistic director to the Prussian Ministry of Culture in Berlin, and from 1880 to 1905, he served as general director of the Royal Museum of Berlin, in which capacity, he was at the forefront of many important acquisitions, innovations and improvements.

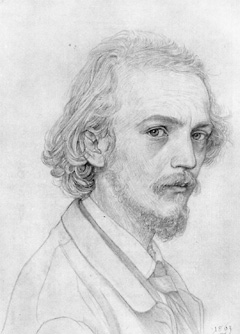
Richard Schöne (self portrait)

In 1994 the Richard-Schöne-Gesellschaft für Museumsgeschichte e. V. (Richard Schöne Society for Museum History) was founded in Berlin.

== Selected writings ==
- Inscriptiones parietariae Pompeianae, Herculanenses, Stabianae, 1871.
- Griechische Reliefs aus athenischen Sammlungen, 1872 – Greek reliefs from Athenian collections.
- Le antichità del Museo Bocchi di Adria, 1878 – Antiquities of the Museo Bocchi in Adria.
- Philonis Mechanicae syntaxis libri quartus et quintus (about Philo of Byzantium, 1893)
- Aeneae Tactici De obsidione toleranda commentarius (about Aeneas Tacticus, 1911).

He was also the author of memoirs and obituaries, publishing writings on Carl Humann, Ernst Curtius, Theodor Mommsen and Friedrich III.
