= Francus =

Legendary king of the Franks

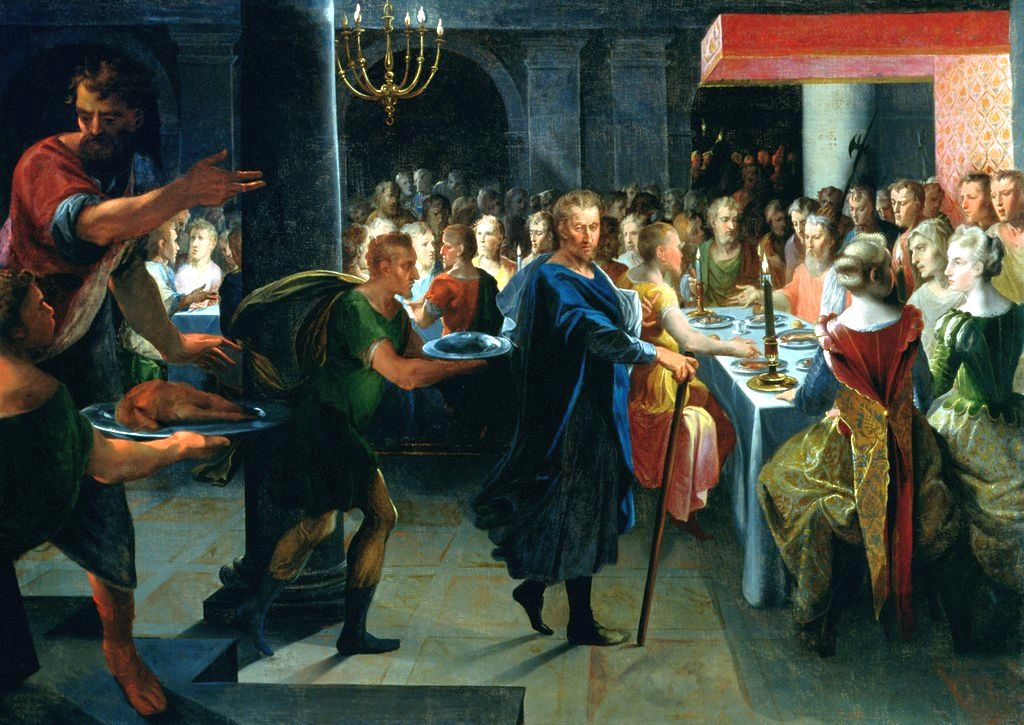
Dice Offering a Banquet to Francus, in the Presence of Hyante and Climene, from 'La Franciade' by Pierre de Ronsard, painted by Toussaint Dubreuil (16th century)

Francus, also called Francio, is a mythical figure of Frankish medieval historians which referred to a legendary eponymous king of the Franks, a descendant of the Trojans and forefather of the Merovingian dynasty. In the Renaissance, Francus was generally considered to be another name for the Trojan Astyanax (son of Hector) saved from the destruction of Troy. He is not considered to be historical, but medieval and Renaissance chroniclers attempted to model the founding of France upon the same illustrious tradition as that used by Virgil in his Aeneid (which had Rome founded by the Trojan Aeneas).

The 7th century Chronicle of Fredegar contains the oldest mention of a medieval legend thus linking the Franks to the Trojans. The Carolingian Liber historiae Francorum elaborates new details, and the tradition continued to be elaborated throughout the Middle Ages, when it was taken seriously as genealogy and became a "veritable form of ethnic consciousness".

The 8th-century Historia Brittonum, borrowing from the 6th-century Frankish Table of Nations, makes mention of Francus as one of the four sons of Hisicion (Francus, Romanus, Alamanus, and Brutus), grandsons of Alanus, the first man to live in Europe.

The Grandes Chroniques de France (13th - 15th centuries), a vast compilation of historic material, make reference of the Trojan origins of the French dynasty.

Johannes Trithemius's De origine gentis Francorum compendium (1514) describes the Franks as originally Trojans (called "Sicambers" or "Sicambrians") after the fall of Troy who came into Gaul after being forced out of the area around the mouth of the Danube by the Goths in 439 B.C. (section 1, p, 33). He also details the reigns of each of these kings—including Francus (section 43, p. 76) from whom the Franks are named—and their battles with the Gauls, Goths, Saxons, etc.

Annio da Viterbo also describes the arrival of Trojans into Gaul.

Based on the medieval legend, Jean Lemaire de Belges's Illustrations de Gaule et Singularités de Troie (1510–12) has Astyanax survive the fall of Troy and arrive in Western Europe. He changes his name to Francus and becomes king of Celtic Gaul (while, at the same time, Bavo, cousin of Priam, comes to the city of Trier) and founds the dynasty leading to Pepin and Charlemagne. He is said to have founded and named the city of Paris in honor of his uncle Paris.

Gilles Corrozet's La Fleur des antiquitez... de Paris (1532) describes Francis I as the 64th descendant of Hector of Troy.

Lemaire de Belges' work inspired Pierre de Ronsard's epic poem La Franciade (1572). In this poem, Jupiter saves Astyanax (renamed Francus). The young hero arrives in Crete and falls in love with the princess Hyante with whom he is destined to found the royal dynasty of France. The epic nonetheless remained unfinished, with only four out of a planned twenty four books ever published. An attempt to continue it was made by Jacques Guillot, who wrote a fifth and sixth book of his own.

Francus was also the subject of Jean Godard's 1594 tragedy, also entitled La Franciade.

== See also ==
In the tradition of translatio imperii, many medieval authors established Greek or Roman genealogies for European dynasties:

- Brutus of Troy - the legendary founder of Britain
- Benoît de Saint-Maure, in his Chronique des ducs de Normandie, linked the Plantagenet family to Aeneas.
