= Old East Slavic literature =

Literary works of Old East Slavic authors

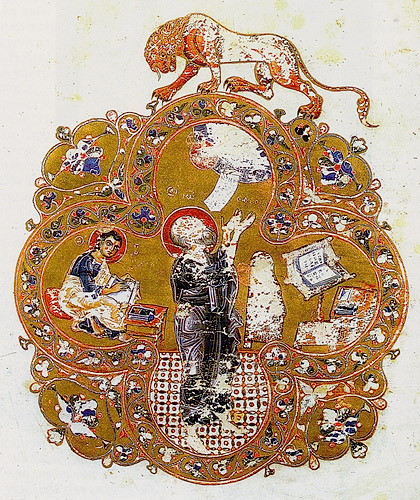
The Evangelist John, a miniature from the Ostromir Gospel, mid-11th century

Old East Slavic literature, also known as Old Russian literature, is a collection of literary works of Rus' authors, which includes all the works of ancient Rus' theologians, historians, philosophers, translators, etc., and written in Old East Slavic. It is a general term that unites the common literary heritage of Belarus, Russia, and Ukraine of the ancient period. In terms of genre construction, it has a number of differences from medieval European literature. The greatest influence on the literature of ancient Rus' was exerted by old Polish and old Serbian literature.

Most of the monuments of Old East Slavic literature have been preserved in the form of manuscripts. The most common type of manuscript was literary collections. Notebooks written by a single scribe could then be bound by the scribe or binder himself. Such collections can be of a certain ("Zlatostruy", "Izmaragd", "Solemn", etc.) or indefinite content, reflecting the individual tastes and interests of one or another scribe who selected materials for himself or for his customer.

Unlike other traditionalist literatures, the Old East Slavic literature is characterized by syncretism, lack of clearly expressed poetological reflection, conscious rejection of rationalism and specification of theoretical knowledge. It differs from Byzantine literature by its emphasized irregularity, the blurring of genres and boundaries between the prosaic and the poetic, and the lack of a clear conceptual apparatus.

Voluminous works could be copied and intertwined into separate books: some letopises, works on world history, paterics, works of a liturgical nature, prologues, etc. Small compositions, for example, "Praying of Daniel the Immured" or the Tale of the Destruction of the Rus' Land did not make up separate books, but were distributed in collections.

== Origins ==
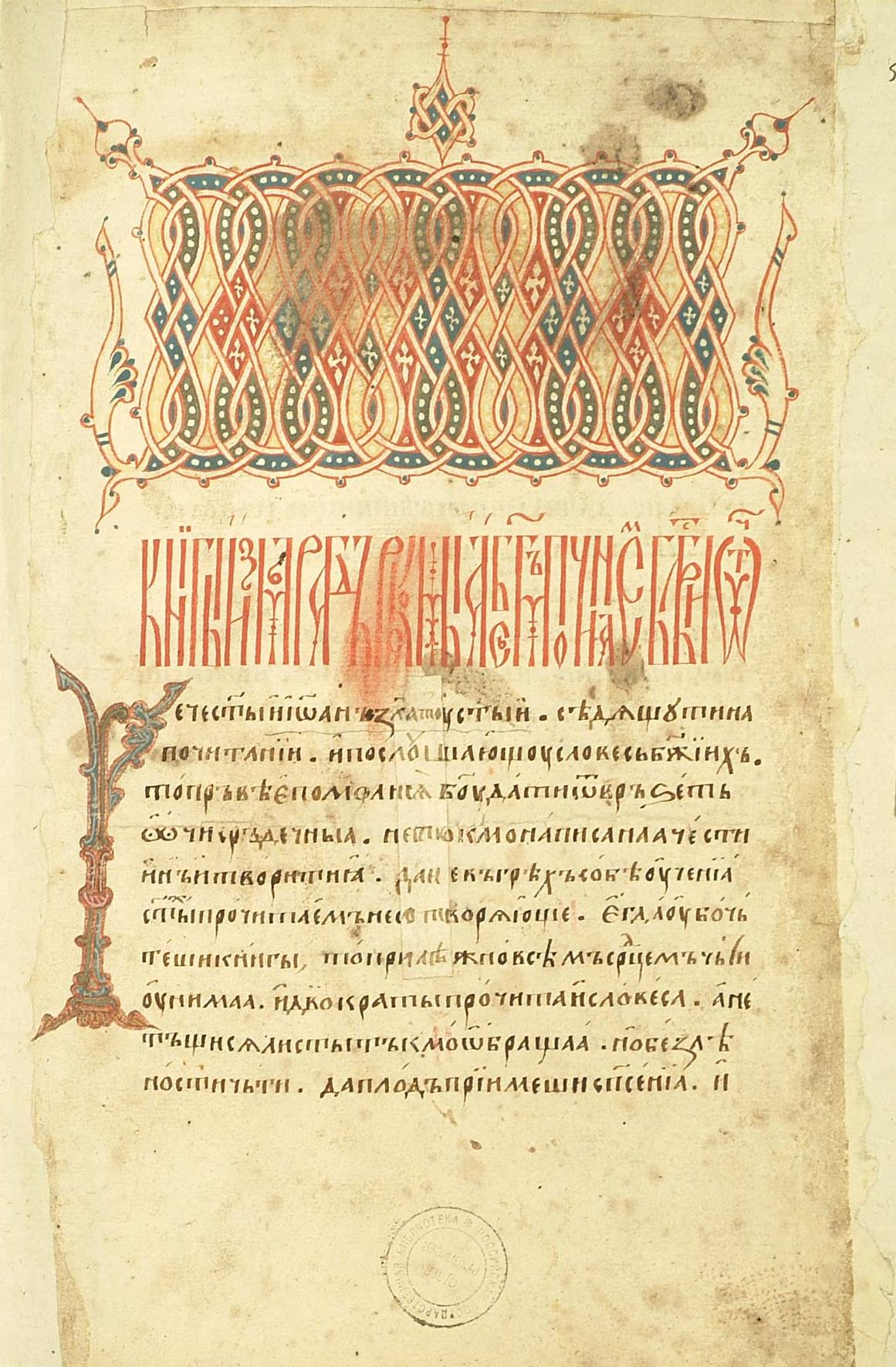
Izmaragd, early 14th century

=== Pre-Christian period ===
The early examples of pre-Christian Old East Slavic Rus' literature should primarily include the oral epic: legends, myths and fairy tales. Most of the Old East Slavic oral folklore was recorded only in the 18th and 19th centuries.

Among the oral works, stories about the meeting of a person with an otherworldly force were particularly distinguished. Such a story by genre was divided into a bailichka, where a meeting with evil spirits is told on behalf of an "eyewitness", and a byvalschina, an oral story about a case that allegedly took place in reality, without focusing on the personal testimony of the narrator. bylichka and byvalschina were often told in the villages to friends or children in order to wean them to walk far from home, and, according to Yevgeny Meletinsky, they became the prototype of "scary fairy tales". Later, a special type of druzhina poetry began to take shape – bylina, Rus' epic poems about heroic or mythological events or remarkable episodes of national history. In some ways, bylina are similar to skaldic poetry: both are divided into songs of praise and blasphemy and glorify some historical event. Bylina, as a rule, are written in tonic verse with two or four accents.

=== Early period: translated Apocrypha ===
Almost all the literature of Rus' – original and translated – was handwritten. Handwritten works were distributed by copying by scribes or ordinary people.

In Rus', the apocrypha about the Last Judgment was especially popular. Among such works, a special place was occupied by the life of Basil the Younger, the second part of which (scenes from the vision of Vasily Gregory's pupil about the Last Judgment and a lengthy story about Theodore) spread as independent works.

Later, the original Old East Slavic apocrypha began to be created, the most famous of which is "The Walking of the Virgin through the Torments". Its plot is similar to the Greek "Revelation of the Most Holy Theotokos", but it also has many original features: for example, pagans who worship Troyan, Veles and Perun are in the first circle of hell, and there are a number of anti-Semitic statements in the text itself.

According to the philosopher Sergei Bulgakov, the special popularity of apocryphal literature in Rus' is indicated by the fact that of the seven most important monuments of the Jewish apocalyptic (except for the books of the prophet Daniel), three were preserved exclusively in Old Slavonic translations.

=== Early original compositions ===
Presumably, both epics and folk tales were not recorded by contemporaries for the reason that Rus' inherited from the Byzantine Empire a ban on literary fiction and the presence of a purely artistic function in the works. Back in 1073, the compilers of the Izbornik Svyatoslav warned against worldly writings based on artistic imagination. Fiction developed only in the late period.

However, despite some limitations, scientific and artistic works had to answer questions related to natural history (the origin of the world, cosmology) and the development of human society (the settlement of peoples, the origin of power, the state, the meaning and purpose of human history).

The first original works in Kievan Rus' were instructive collections, which are the most common type of manuscripts (even after the beginning of printing in Russia in 1569, manuscripts have not lost their popularity). The scribe copied various works according to some attribute or genre in a notebook. Notebooks written by one scribe could then be bound by the scribe himself or the bookbinder into a separate book. The bookbinder could collect notebooks of different times and different scribes and connect them because they were of the same format or were combined by them according to content. Such collections are currently called convolutes. Such collections of teachings as Izmaragd, Golden Chain, Bee, Solemn, Zlatostruy (origins), Pchela (of Byzantine origin) were originally intended for home and monastic cell reading. Included in these is the Palea, a collection of several interconnected ancient Rus' works that set out Old Testament history, with additions from apocryphal monuments, as well as with theological reasoning.

Already in the early period of the development of Rus' literature, one can trace the understanding of Rus' not only as an ethno-political and religious community, but also as the Kingdom of Christ. In the Sermon on Law and Grace of the middle of the 11th century (the future Metropolitan, Hilarion of Kiev), the newly baptized Rus' people are called new. The perception of the people who were baptized in the "last times" (before the Last Judgment) as new, endowed with special grace, was characteristic of Rus'. The widespread idea of an imminent dreadful judgment was strongly reflected in the Old East Slavic literature of that period; ascetic creations and instructive literature became an introduction to soteriology (the doctrine of the salvation of the soul).

== Genres ==
As most modern researchers note, there is no clear division of literature into genres in ancient Rus'. There were only a few authors who clearly defined the genre of their works (among such were the monk Phoma, Nil Sorsky, Metropolitan Macarius, and the nameless author of "The Tale of Mikhail Tverskoy"). Thus, the lexeme Word (Old East Slavic: Слово, romanized: Slovo, also translatable as Tale, Lay or Discourse (Note: For example, the Слово ѡ погибели Рꙋскыꙗ земли is most commonly known in English as the Tale of the Destruction of the Rus' Land, but also known in English under titles such as Tale of (or Lay of or Discourse on) the Destruction of the Russian Land.)) often perceived as the name of a genre, could mean a didactic teaching, a chapter of a book, a conversation, a speech, articles of various content, etc.

Nevertheless, Nikita Tolstoy made an attempt to classify ancient Rus' literature; later, the classification was edited by Evgeny Vereshchagin (the latter version is somewhat different from Tolstoy's):

- scriptural monuments: the Bible (Holy Scripture) and biblical apocrypha, see Bible translations into Church Slavonic
- liturgical/euchographic: liturgical books and hymnographic monuments
- doctrinal: symbols, statements of faith, catechumens, polemical and ethical instructive teachings, interpretations
- preaching: oratory prose and gnostic literature
- hagiographic: lives of saints, laudatory words to saints, tales of acquisitions, transfer of relics and icons, miracles
- canonical and legal: statutes, Kormchaia Books, law books (Kievan Rus' law), contractual, spiritual, deeds, etc. letters
- memorial: letopises (including Rus' chronicles and Lithuanian–Belarusian chronicles), chronographs, descriptions of historical events, pilgrimages, travels
- scientific: encyclopedic collections
- household: private correspondence, inscriptions, epigraphy.

This classification does not distinguish between primary genres (for example, hagiographies) and unifying genres that include small works as source material (prologue, menaiat-chets, etc.). This difference is taken into account in the classification based on the systematics of Dmitry Likhachev, who distinguished between monumental and small genre forms. Nikolai Prokofiev gave the following classification:

- complex forms: letopises, chronographs, hagiographic collections, letters, etc.
- primary genres:
  - epic genres
    - historical genres: lives of the saints, military tale, legend and walking
    - allegorical: parables
    - symbolic: miracle, vision, sign, divinatory literature
  - lyrical genres: teaching, message, crying.

The most important feature of epic genres is the object of the image and lyrical purpose.

== Mathematics and cosmology ==
=== Mathematical-Easter essays ===
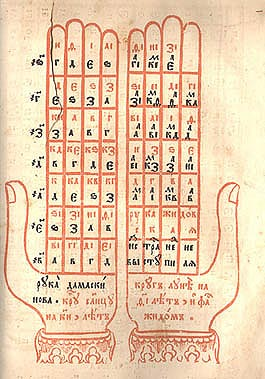
"The Hand of John of Damascus". Medieval method for calculating the Paschal calendar. On the left: "the hand of Damaskin", on it 28 circles to the Sun — red Slavic numbers Old Slavonic alphabet, under each of them "vruceleto", each circle of the Sun — black Slavic numbers. On the right: "the Jewish hand", on it 19 lunar circles — red Slavic numbers, under each of them the Easter border, each circle of the Moon — black Slavic numbers.

In the early period after the Christianization of Kievan Rus', there was no special church calendar, and the Old Slavic calendar was not suitable for calculating church holidays. Therefore, many authors had to make their own calculations in their works, which ranked their works among not only Paschal, but also mathematical treatises. For complex calculations, schoty was often used.

The earliest mathematical work of Kievan Rus' is considered to be "the doctrine of numbers" by Kirik the Novgorodian, a treatise on the calculus of time, combining an essay on mathematics, chronology and Paschalistics.

However, later mathematical treatises did not receive a proper development in Kievan Rus'. Among the works equal to the "doctrine of numbers", scientists include the "Charter of military Affairs" created in the 15th and 16th centuries, which set out the tasks of triangulation on the ground, and the "Book of soshny writing", dedicated to land surveying. Later works include an extensive manuscript entitled "Synodal No. 42", the first textbook in Rus' on theoretical geometry.

=== Cosmology works ===
The early cosmological works of Kievan Rus' were partially influenced by apocryphal writings, mixed with pre-Christian ideas about the structure of the world.

Thus, much attention is paid to the creation and structure of the world in two of the most significant early works: the Dove Book and "About the whole creation". Both works have a complex structure and are probably based on Old East Slavic apocryphal legends that existed for the early period after the Christianization of Kievan Rus'.

It is also interesting that in the "Depth Book", as in two other ancient Rus' monuments – "The Conversation of the Three Saints" and "The Conversation of Jerusalem" – for some reason, whales are endowed with supernatural power. In the "Conversation of the Three Saints", the Earth floats on top of the great sea on three large whales and 30 small whales; the latter cover 30 sea windows; "The Conversation of Jerusalem" and "Depth Book" connect the movement of the whale with the end of the world. According to the "Depth Book" — "The Whale-fish is the mother of all fish. On the Whale-fish the earth is founded; when the Whale-fish turns, then our white light is finished (the end of all things will come)".

The so-called "fortune-telling books" (also "divinatory books") can probably also be attributed to cosmological works, which are currently not officially assigned to any of the genres of Kievan Rus'. Fortune-telling books (Volkhovnik, Gromnik, Kolyadnik, Trepetnik, Enchanter, etc.) were mainly distributed secretly: they were copied, sewn into other books, and passed on by inheritance. Officially, the distribution of such literature was persecuted by the church; lists of forbidden (so-called renounced) books of Kievan Rus' were compiled, in which divinatory literature was equated with apocrypha.

== Theological literature ==
Very popular in ancient Rus' were the lives of saints (zhytie), a kind of genre of hagiography that describes the life, deeds and miracles of ancient Rus' saints, martyrs and miracle workers.

== Poetics ==
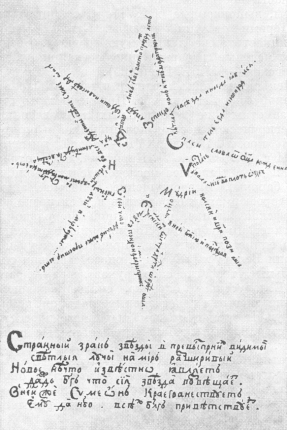
Simeon of Polotsk. The poem in the form of a star "Greeting to Tsar Alexei Mikhailovich on the occasion of the birth of Tsarevich Simeon".

The scientist Alexander Panchenko refers to the earliest forms of Old East Slavic versification as the so-called "penitential poems" (the metrical nature of which is not yet clear), single poetic texts written by the monk of the Kirillo-Belozersky monastery Efrosin, as well as separate chapters The Tale of Igor's Campaign and the Tale of the Destruction of the Rus' Land containing a metric constant.

Despite this, versification in Kievan Rus' was most often not approved, because was considered inherent only in "Latins". This position was most consistently expressed by Archpriest Avvakum: “Do not look for rhetoric and philosophy, or eloquence, but live with a sound true verb. (Note: That is, if a person from birth is given to speak in ordinary speech, then there is no need to tempt God by composing rhymes, and even more so using them in worship.) Therefore, а rhetorician and philosopher cannot be a Christian. Alexander Panchenko pointed out that the Old East Slavic church poetry was strongly influenced by West Slavic, especially Polish literature. Simeon Polotsky, releasing his "Rhymed Psalter" (1680), wrote that in Moscow they loved "the consonant singing of the Polish Psalter".

=== Syllabic verse ===
Some of the earliest representatives of Old East Slavic syllabic poetry are such poets as Karion Istomin, Simeon of Polotsk, Theophan Prokopovich, Antiochus Kantemir, Sylvester Medvedev and Mardary Khonykov. The principle of syllabic symmetry was dominant. A twelve-syllable verse with a caesura after the fifth or sixth syllable was used; there are, for example, such complex schemes as: 5-6-8|8-6-5|7-7-4-5-3-5 (12 verses of Irmos "Земьнъ къто слыша таковая"...) or 8|5-5-5|8-8|5-5-5 (9 verses of Irmos "Вьсъ еси желание"...) There were also schemes where the number of syllables in each verse was a multiple of three (from St. Trinity, the sacred number "three" for Christians).

The detailed life in the monastery can be judged by the syllabic poem by Karion Istomin "About speaking from people, how monks live in the monastery":

Мънози глаголют, что монахи деют,
где в монастыре дела не имеют.
Бутто так сидят, ничего не знают,
како ли Богу честь, поклон взношают.
Надобно кому себе искусити
и в монастыре хоть время прожити.
Узнает, как кто в кельи пребывает,
како помыслы, страсти отвергеет ...

Translation:

Many say that monks are idle
that they have no tasks in a monastery.
As if they are just sitting so, knowing nothing,
only how to honor God, how to bow down to Him.
Test yourselves with the experience
and at least live in a monastery for a while.
Then you will learn how someone stays in a cell,
how they reject thoughts, passions ...

=== Acrostics ===
The acrostic form became very popular in Ancient Rus' poetics. It was also widely developed there. The earliest work in the genre of acrostic in ancient Russia is considered to be the Azbuchna Prayer, translated from Old Bulgarian. The acrostic in the Old East Slavic book poetry was also known in later times. Thus, the acrostic is found in one of the "greetings" of Karion Istomin to Tsarevich Alexey Petrovich:

Аминь буди слава,

Любовь чиста, права
Единому Богу,
К себе в слогах многу.
Исраиль нелестный,
Избранный и честный
Царев сын, царевичь
Алексий Петровичь,
Радуйся блаженно,
Емли жизнь спасенно,
В Господе изрядствуй,
Излестно отрадствуй,
Человеком в ползе,
В златых летах долзе.
Езди умне в книгах,
Чти мудрость в веригах:
Ности она златы,
Общит в любовь браты.
Жити с нею благо,
Имство всем предраго.
Взрасти тя Бог в славе,

Имети ю здраве!

Here the acrostic is "Alexy Tsarevich live forever" (Алексий царевич вечно живи; in the fourth verse in the original, the first letter is the Slavic "xi").

== Kievan Rus' law, documentation ==
In Kievan Rus', there were a number of canonical and legal statutes and rights. The special charters, judicial books, contractual, spiritual certificates and contribution certificates were common for the people and for the church. Most collections of Kievan Rus' law are strictly divided into civil and ecclesiastical. The exception is the Merilo Pravednoye, which is both a collection of church-canonical and civil legal legal nature.

=== Temporal law ===
The legal basis of the Kievan Rus' state was the Russkaya Pravda, Lithuanian statutes and Moscow Sidebniks. (Note: Sudebnik is a collection of laws of the period of the estate monarchy in Kievan Rus'. To date, Sudebnik of 1497, Sudebnik of 1550 and Sudebnik of 1589 are known.) In 1649, the Sobornoye Ulozheniye was added to these written laws.

The so-called Russkaya Pravda ("Rus' Justice") is of great importance for the study of Kievan Rus' law. The Russkaya Pravda is a collection of legal norms of Rus', dated from various years, starting from 1016, the oldest Rus' legal code. The Russkaya Pravda contains the norms of criminal, compulsory, hereditary, family and procedural law. It is the main source for studying the legal, social and economic relations of Kievan Rus'. The Russkaya Pravda is similar to earlier European legal collections, such as Germanic law (the so-called Leges Barbarorum, "laws of the barbarians"), for example, the Salic law, a collection of legislative acts of the Frankish state, the oldest text of which dates back to the beginning of the 6th century.

The short version consists of the following parts:

- The Oldest Pravda or the truth of Yaroslav (Articles 1-18), 1016, is usually associated with the activities of Yaroslav the Wise;
- The Pravda of the Yaroslavichs (Izyaslav, Vsevolod and Svyatoslav, sons of Yaroslav the Wise, who were part of the Yaroslavich triumvirate) (articles 19–41), the youngest of the three princes Vsevolod is named before the middle Svyatoslav), does not have an exact date, often refers to 1072;
- Pokon virny (Article 42) – determination of the order of "feeding" of virniks (princely servants, collectors of vir-court fines), 1020s or 1030s;
- Urok to mostniks (Article 43) – regulation of the remuneration of bridge builders, or, according to some versions, bridge builders, 1020s or 1030s.

As many researchers have noted, the most ancient part of the Russkaya Pravda (the oldest pravda) preserves the custom of blood feud, characteristic of the laws of pre-Christian Kievan Rus', although it limits it to the circle of closest relatives. The lengthy version includes about 121 articles and consists of two parts-the Charter of Yaroslav Vladimirovich and the Charter of Vladimir Vsevolodovich Monomakh. According to most researchers, the Lengthy Truth is based on the Short text, which was amended and supplemented, including those adopted during the Kiev reign of Vladimir II Monomakh.

=== Ecclesiastical law ===
With the Christianization of Kievan Rus', church law arose. The most important source of church law in Kievan Rus' was the sudebniki, the most famous of which is the Zakon Sudnyi Liudem (the South Slavic legal Code of the 9th and 10th centuries, although some scholars consider it a reworking of some Byzantine and Jewish laws). However, most often in the ecclesiastical sphere of Kievan Rus', they used kormchaia books, legal collections that contained both church rules and the decisions of the Roman and Byzantine emperors on the church.

From the translated Byzantine collections of ecclesiastical law in Kievan Rus', nomocanons, Eclogue, Procheiron, and Zanon books (translation of Byzantine laws) were used. However, despite the widespread existence in the written tradition, Byzantine law did not have a significant application in legal practice, and its full reception did not occur. Rus' ecclesiastical law was based primarily on the ecclesiastical statutes issued by the knyazes, based on local law and only limited borrowing of Byzantine law.

Later, in 1551, the comprehensive religious collection Stoglav was created, combining the norms of judicial, criminal and ecclesiastical law. Stoglav tried to solve the following pressing issues:

- strengthening of church discipline among the clergy and the fight against the vicious behavior of representatives of the church (drunkenness, debauchery, bribery), usury of monasteries,
- unification of church rites and services,
- powers of the ecclesiastical court,
- combating the remnants of paganism among the population,
- strict regulation (and, in essence, the introduction of a kind of spiritual censorship) of the order of correspondence of church books, the writing of icons, the construction of Russian Orthodox Church buildings, etc.

"Books of law" and "Merilo Pravednoye", one of the first Kievan Rus' collections of a civil and ecclesiastical-legal nature, contain both excerpts from Byzantine legislation and identical articles of Rus' origin, probably included in collections from an older one that did not come down to us of the collection of Kievan Rus' law.

== See also ==
- Outline of Slavic history and culture
- List of Slavic studies journals
- Belarusian literature
- Russian literature
- Ukrainian literature

== Works cited ==
- Likhachev, Dmitry S. ed. (1987–1989). Словарь книжников и книжности Древней Руси [Dictionary of scribes and books of Ancient Russia]. (in Russian) Volumes 1–3. Academy of Sciences of the USSR; Institute of Russian Literature (Pushkin House) of the Russian Academy of Sciences. Leningrad: Nauka.
  - Kobiak, Nikolay (1989). "Списки отреченных книг [Lists of renounced books]". In D. S. Likhachev (ed.). Dictionary of scribes and books of Ancient Russia. Section – С (Савва – Стословец Геннадия) [S (Savva – Storslovets Gennadiy)] (in Russian). Vol. 2: The second half of the 14th century – 16th century, Part 2: Л–Я. Leningrad: Nauka.
  - Tvorogov, Oleg V. (1987). "Палея толковая [Explanatory Palea]". In D. S. Likhachev (ed.). Dictionary of scribes and books of Ancient Russia. Section – П (Павел Высокий – Пчела) [P: (Pavel Vysokiy – Pchela)] (in Russian). Vol. 1: 11th century – first half of the 14th century. Leningrad: Nauka.
- Halperin, Charles J. (2022). The Rise and Demise of the Myth of the Rus' Land (PDF). Leeds: Arc Humanities Press. p. 107. ISBN 9781802700565.
- Hrushevsky, Mykhailo (1997). History of Ukraine-Rus'. Toronto: Canadian Institute of Ukrainian Studies Press. p. 602. ISBN 9781895571196.
- Hunczak, Taras (2001). "The Tale of the Destruction of the Rus Land". Тисяча років української суспільно-політичної думки: х-хв ст (Tysi͡acha rokiv Ukraïnsʹkoï suspilʹno-politychnoï dumky: x-xv st) [A Thousand Years of Ukrainian Socio-Political Thought: 15th–16th Centuries]. Kyiv: Dnipro. p. 621.
- Sinor, Denis (1990). The Cambridge History of Early Inner Asia, Volume 1. Cambridge: Cambridge University Press. p. 518. ISBN 9780521243049.
