= Palea =

Palea may refer to:

- Palea (botany), part of the flower structure in some plants
- Palea (turtle), a genus of turtles in the family Trionychidae
- San Antonio de Palé, a town in Equatorial Guinea
- Palea (literature), old Russian work of apocryphal content
