= Pelea =

Pelea may refer to:

- A genus of mammals containing a single species, the grey rhebok, Pelea capreolus
- A genus of Hawaiian plants in the family Rutaceae, now considered synonymous with Melicope

== See also ==
- Palea (disambiguation)
