= Byvalschina =

Russian folk tale story

Byvalschina (in Russian: Бывальщина) is a short oral story in Russian folklore about a supernatural incident: a case that took place in reality, without focusing on the personal testimony of the narrator (in contrast to the bylichka, where the story is recounted on behalf of the "eyewitness"). It echoes the term urban legend.

The byvalschina (in comparison to the bylichka) is closer to legends and fairy tales ("people say that...").

== History ==
The terms bylichka and byvalschina became known among the people no later than the 19th century. At the end of the 19th and beginning of the 20th centuries, Dmitry Sadovnikov, Pyotr Efimenko, Nikolai Onchukov, Dmitry Zelenin, Boris and Yuri Sokolov, and Irina Karnaukhova collected byvalshchines and bylichki.

A more complete study of the bylichki took place in the second half of the 20th century. Erna Pomérantseva proposed a clear distinction between the terms bylichka and byvalschina: "the term bylichka corresponds to the concept of superstitious memorat[e] ... From the byvalschina, tradition, that is, the plot ... the bylichka is distinguished by ... formlessness, singularity, lack of community."

== See also ==
- Applied folklore – branch of folkloristics concerned with the study and use of folklore and traditional cultural
- Tall tale – Story with unbelievable elements, related as if it were true and factual
