= Tale of the Destruction of the Rus' Land =

Text of Old Slavic literature

- «Слово ѡ погибели Рꙋскыꙗ земли»
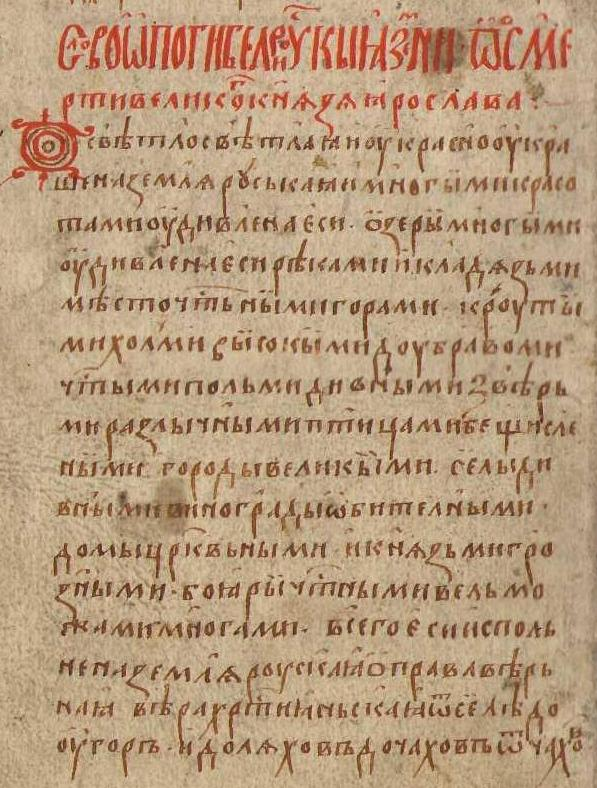
- Language: Old East Slavic
- Manuscript(s): 2

The Tale of the Destruction of the Rus' Land (Note: Variations of the text's title in English include Tale of / Lay of / Discourse on the Destruction of the Rus' / Russian Land. Donald Ostrowski (2020) rendered it as Oration about the Ruin of the Rus' Land.) (Old East Slavic: Слово ѡ погибели Рꙋскыꙗ земли (Note: Full title Tale of the Destruction of the Rus' Land after the death of Grand Prince Yaroslav (Old East Slavic: Слово ѡ погибели Рꙋскыꙗ земли и пѡ смерти великого кнѧзѧ Ѧрослава, romanized: Slovo o pohibeli Russkoy zemli y po smerty velykoho knyazya Yaroslava).), romanized: Slovo o pogibeli Russkoi zemli) is a text of Old East Slavic literature dating back to the 13th century and known from two manuscripts of the 15th and 16th centuries. It is a reflection on the Mongol invasion of Kievan Rus'.

This is one of the most significant works in the Old East Slavic genre of the word, which is considered the forerunner of the essay genre. The text is not fully known, as only fragments of it have survived.

== Publication history ==
The manuscript was published in 1892 by Khrisanf Mefodievich Loparev in St. Petersburg, but as early as 1878 this source was known to the Pskov archaeologist K. G. Evlentiev. On the back of the top cover of the binding of the collection containing the Tale of the Destruction of the Rus' Land, on 24 May 1878, he made a postscript: “NB A variety of Prologue. (Note: Slavic Synaxarium) It begins with the story of Daniel the prophet (with spaces for drawings) - without a beginning. This is the 1st tale. There are 22 tales in all - September, October, November and December, March, April, May. The last one, 22nd, Tale of the Destruction of the Rus' Land, about the death of the Grand Prince Yaroslav (and the Life of Alexander Nevsky) - only the beginning and end, there is no middle, the sheets are torn out. Too bad, it is a great tale. 16th century manuscript. Pskov."

Two copies of the manuscript were found: one in Pskov-Pechersk, dating to the 15th century, and the other one in Riga, dating to the 16th century.

== Dating and authorship ==
Dates proposed for the composition of the Tale of the Destruction of the Rus' Land range from 1238 (the beginning of the Mongol-Tatar invasion) to 1246 (the year of the death of Yaroslav Vsevolodovich (1191–1246). Alexander Solovyov argued that prince Yaroslav is mentioned in the text as if he were still alive. (Note: "«Слово» ясно говорит «до нынешнего Ярослава»; эти слова доказывают, что поэт собирался говорить о подвигах и страданиях живого Ярослава". ("The Tale clearly says 'to the present Yaroslav'; these words prove that the poet was going to talk about the deeds and sufferings of the living Yaroslav.")) Scholars disagree about where and when exactly it was written, with some arguing it was written somewhere in the northeast of the Rus' principalities after the initial Mongol campaign of 1237–1238, while others maintain it was penned down later in Kyiv right after the Mongols sacked it in 1240.

The reason for writing was the news from Vladimir-Suzdal about the invasion of Batu and the death of Yaroslav's brother Yuri in the battle on the Sit River against the Mongols. Some researchers believed that the Tale of the Destruction of the Rus' Land was originally a preface to the secular biography of Alexander Nevsky that has not come down to us. Alexander Solovyov categorically disagreed with this, referring to the fact that the Tale was conceived and written during Yaroslav's lifetime. "The task [of the poetic work] was to sing of the former glory of the motherland in contrast to the terrible Tatar invasion; Grand Duke Yaroslav Vsevolodich, to whom the author was close, was to play the main role in this work".

Some assume that the description of the greatness and power of the Rus' land provided in the Tale preceded the story about the invasion of Batu, which has not been preserved. This character of the introduction to the text, which was supposed to tell about the sorrows and troubles of the country, is not accidental. This feature of the Tale of the Destruction of the Rus' Land finds a typological correspondence with the works of ancient and medieval literature.

=== Views of scholars ===
Professor Mikhail Tikhomirov (1956), writing that the author of the Tale accurately reveals to readers a map of the Rus' land in the first half of the 13th century, concluded that 'the geographical terms of the author and his political hints lead us ... to the second or third decades of the 13th century', so that the Tale was created after the Battle of the Kalka River and that Novgorod was the “far away” from where its author looked at the Rus' land. It was written "even before the Batu campaigns, during the reign of Yaroslav Vsevolodich in Novgorod," the current Yaroslav "(according to the author of the manuscript), maybe around 1225". This opinion was already expressed in 1929 by Alexei Sobolevsky.

Professor N. K. Gudziy believes that the Tale was written not in Novgorod, but most likely in Pereyaslavl, before the battle of the Sit river on 4 March 1238, since in it Yuri, and not Yaroslav, is called the Prince of Vladimir.

The philologist Alexander Solovyov, opposing the versions about the writing of the Tale in Novgorod, notes that the author is very accurate in designating the southwestern border of Rus' with the Ugrians, Czechs, Poles, Yatvyaz and Lithuanians. However, when approaching Novgorod and Pskov, its accuracy disappears. The Tale of Bygone Years knows within these limits the neighbors and tributaries of Rus': Korshi, narowa, lib, zimegola, chud, wes, jääm. The author of the Tale does not name any of these tribes, although they should have been known in Novgorod, he only says "to the Germans" and from the Germans makes a leap across the Gulf of Finland "to the Korels." Meanwhile, the Novgorod chronicles constantly mention the Chud (Ests) as their neighbors, besides, the Chud was subordinate at that time not to the Germans, but to the Danes, whom the author of the Tale did not mention either.

Alexander Solovyov also draws attention to the last words of the passage: "from the great Yaroslav and to Volodimer (Monomakh) and to the present Yaroslav and to his brother Yury Prince Volodimersky." According to Solovyov, the present is a living ruler, protagonist of the work. Therefore, the author of the Tale of the Destruction intended to praise, against the backdrop of the past greatness of the Rus' land, its current Grand Prince Yaroslav. “The fact that his older brother Yuri Vsevolodich is modestly called the ‘Prince of Volodimer’, is not called the ‘current’ and is placed after his younger brother Yaroslav, makes it possible to conclude that the Tale was written after the battle of the Sit river on 4 March 1238. After this catastrophe, in the midst of the terrible “destruction of the Rus' Land”, Yaroslav survived, remained the legitimate heir to the listed grand princes, the organizer of the devastated homeland. The author wants to praise him, mentioning his brother Yuri only because he wanted to touch on the battle of the Sit river and the tragic death of this prince and all his troops", the scholar concludes.

Charles J. Halperin (1976, 1981) argued that the text was not written in Northeastern Rus', and Serhii Plokhy (2006) stated that he believed 'that Halperin offers sufficient evidence to rule out this [option]'.

== Content ==
In response to the devastation caused by the "pagan" Mongols, the author invoked his Christian identity in order to portray the Rus' as a Christian land: "Thou, Rus' Land, art rich in wealth and the Orthodox Christian faith." The text goes on to state that the Rus' Land is blessed by "ecclesiastical houses" (domy tserkovnye), monasteries or churches, and illuminated by the Christian religion (svetlorusskaia zemlia).

According to the text, the Burtas, Cheremis, Mordvins, and the Veda or Viada (probably a Finno-Ugric people) were tributaries of Kievan Rus' during the reign of Vladimir II Monomakh.

== Proximity to The Tale of Igor's Campaign ==
The Tale of the Destruction of the Rus' Land is considered by many researchers to be close to a number of fragments of The Tale of Igor's Campaign.

Alexander Soloviev refers to the words of Dmitry Likhachev: 'the feeling of the motherland as a grandiose living being, as the totality of all native history, culture and nature' was already expressed with particular force in The Tale of Igor's Campaign and 'this broad image of the Rus' land permeates Rus' literature throughout its development".

Just like The Tale of Igor's Campaign, the Tale wanted to recall the 'old times of strife', which were a 'disease' for Christians, in order to lead to a tragic catastrophe, to the invasion of the Tatars, which became 'death' for the Rus' land,' Alexander Solovyov wrote.

== Place in medieval literature ==
Alexander Soloviev (1958) believed that the Tale of the Destruction of the Rus' Land is extremely valuable as a vivid manifestation of national consciousness, along with The Tale of Igor's Campaign. In this respect, it occupies a prominent place in medieval poetry of that time.

He compared the Tale and The Tale of Igor's Campaign with Cantar de mio Cid, created in the middle of the 12th century. Soloviev stated that it was difficult to find a clear patriotic idea in the latter. The long poem about Cid (3370 verses) is dedicated to the glorification of a person whose heroism is rather ambiguous: the protagonist is disobedient to his king, expelled by the king from the Kingdom of Castile, he is a "bandit" in the legal sense of the word. Having collected 60 of the same exiles, Cid fights at his own peril and risk.

== Genre originality ==
In Old East Slavic literature, the genre of Tale of the Destruction occupies a special place, bringing it closer to the later Western European essay genre, says Lyudmila Kaida (Doctor of Philology at Lomonosov Moscow State University). External similarity - “in the manner of ancient Rus' authors to reflect on the problems of philosophy, religion, life. The similarity is internal - in the compositional-speech model of the spontaneous development of thought". “The ancient world is manifested for us through the personality of the author, patriotic involvement in the fate of the Rus' land through his philosophical thoughts. All this is close to the reader-author relationship in essay literature,”

== Sources ==
- Yuri Begunov (1965). Rep. ed. Dmitry Likhachev (ed.). Памятник русской литературы XIII века "Слово о погибели русской земли." [Monument of Russian literature of the 13th century: Tale of the Destruction of the Rus' Land: Studies and texts] (in Russian). Moscow, Leningrad: Nauka. p. 232.
- D. S. Likhachev, L. A. Dmitriev, A. A. Alekseev, N. V. Ponyrko. (Ed.) (2005). Слово о погибели русской земли / Подготовка текста, перевод и комментарии Л. А. Дмитриева [Tale of the Destruction of the Rus' Land / Preparation of the text, translation and comments by L. A. Dmitriev. In 20 volumes] (in Russian). Vol. 5. Moscow: Library of Literature of Ancient Russia. p. 528.
- Gorsky, Anton (1990). Likhachev, D.S. (ed.). "Проблемы изучения "Слова о погибели Рускыя земли" (К 750-летию со времени написания)" Problemy izucheniya "Slova o pogibeli Ruskyya zemli" (K 750-letiyu so vremeni napisaniya) [Problems of studying the Tale of the Destruction of the Rus' Land: To the 750th anniversary from the time of writing]. Trudy otdela drevnerusskoy literatury Труды Отдела древнерусской литературы [Proceedings of the Department of Old Russian Literature] (in Russian). 43. Leningrad: USSR Academy of Sciences, Institute of the Russian Language: 18–38. ISSN 0002-3264.
- Halperin, Charles J. (2022). The Rise and Demise of the Myth of the Rus' Land (PDF). Leeds: Arc Humanities Press. ISBN 978-1-80270-056-5.
- Ostrowski, Donald (2020). Who Wrote That? Authorship Controversies from Moses to Sholokhov. Cornell University Press. p. 288. doi:10.7591/cornell/9781501749704.001.0001. ISBN 978-1-5017-4970-4.
- Plokhy, Serhii (2006). The Origins of the Slavic Nations: Premodern Identities in Russia, Ukraine, and Belarus. New York: Cambridge University Press. p. 378. ISBN 978-0-521-86403-9.
- Sinor, Denis (1990). The Cambridge History of Early Inner Asia, Volume 1. Cambridge: Cambridge University Press. p. 518. ISBN 978-0-521-24304-9.
- Soloviev, Alexander (1958). Likhachev, D. S. (ed.). "Zametki k "Slovu o pogibeli Ryskyya zemli"" Заметки к «Слову о погибели Рускыя земли» [Notes on the "Tale of the destruction of the Rus' land"] (PDF). Trudy otdela drevnerusskoy literatury Труды Отдела древнерусской литературы [Proceedings of the Department of Old Russian Literature] (in Russian). 15. Moscow / Leningrad: USSR Academy of Sciences, Institute of the Russian Language: 78–115. Archived from the original (PDF) on 6 March 2016.
- Tikhomirov, Mikhail (1956). Adrianova-Peretts, V. P. (ed.). "Где и когда было написано "Слово о погибели русской земли"" Gde i kogda bylo napisano "Slovo o pogibeli russkoy zemli" [Where and when was the Tale of the Destruction of the Rus' Land written] (PDF). Trudy otdela drevnerusskoy literatury Труды Отдела древнерусской литературы [Proceedings of the Department of Old Russian Literature] (in Russian). 8. Moscow / Leningrad: USSR Academy of Sciences, Institute of the Russian Language: 235–244.
