= Palea (literature) =

- «Толковая Палея яже на иудея» (Explanatory Palea); «Книга бытиа небеси и земли» (Historical Palea)
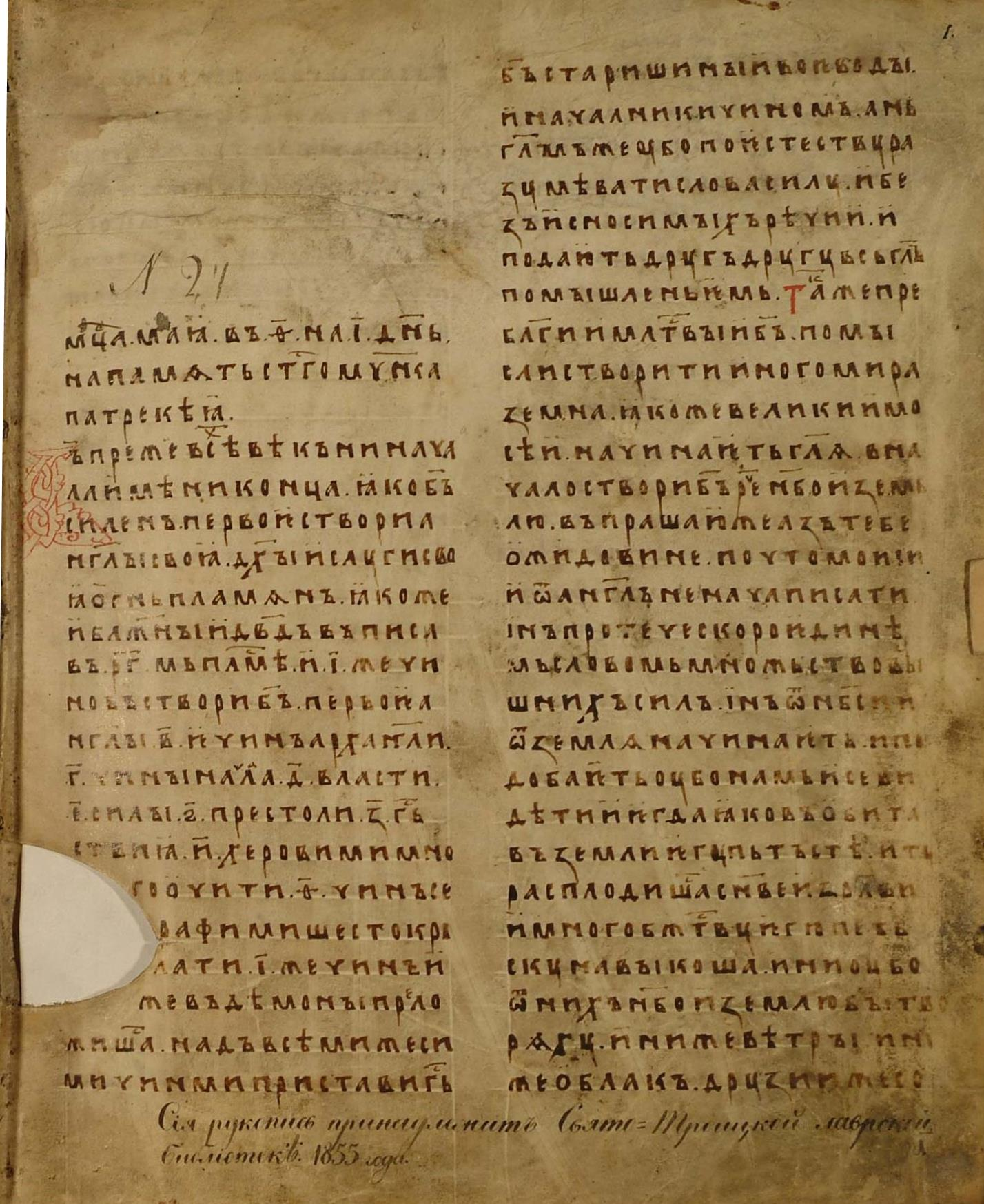
- Explanatory palea. The beginning of the list of 1406
- Author(s): author unknown
- Language: Old Russian
- Date: Explanatory palea - presumably the 13 century or the turn of the 13-14 centuries; Historical palea - presumably the 13 century; Chronographic palea - presumably 15th century or earlier
- Manuscript(s): Surviving codices: Explanatory palea; Historical palea; Chronographic palea
- Genre: Old Russian literature
- Period covered: Biblical times

Palea (Old East Slavic: Палєя, Greek: παλαιός, "ancient, dilapidated"; the name comes from the Greek naming of the Old Testament - παλαιὰ Διαθήκη) is a monument or several interconnected monuments of the Old Russian literature, setting out the Old Testament history with additions from apocryphal monuments and some ancient Christian works, as well as with theological reasoning. A number of researchers consider palea as a monument of Byzantine origin, others consider it an ancient Russian work, since its Greek original is unknown.

Palea is known in the following editions, often considered as separate monuments: Explanatory, Historical and Chronographic.

== General characteristics ==
The place and time of the creation of the Palea has not been established. Izmail Sreznevsky, Nikolai Tikhonravov, Ivan Porfiriev and Vladimir Uspensky considered palea a monument translated from Greek. There is an opinion about the compilation of the initial editions of palea in Bulgaria in the 9th-10th centuries and in Russia in the 13th century. Alexander Mikhailov, Vasily Istrin, Ivan Zhdanov, and Varvara Adrianova-Peretz considered palea as the work of ancient Russian scribes.

Vasily Istrin in his works is one of the first three editions of palea (Explanatory, Historical and Chronographic). The ratio of these editions (monuments) is debatable. Istrin considered the Tolkovaya Paley to be the oldest edition known in Russia, and the Chronographic Paley of both varieties (Short and Complete) to be its later revision. This point of view was shared by Oleg Tvorogov.

According to Anatoly Turilov, with the discovery of the Barsovskaya palea (containing lists of the Chronographic palea) of the beginning of the 15th century, the ideas about the history and textology of the Chronographic palea change. The contemporary Kolomna palea of 1406 (Kolomensky list of the Tolkovaya palea) does not contain the original text of the monument, as researchers of the 19th century believed, but its abridged edition, created at the turn of the 14th-15th centuries, most likely, surrounded by Metropolitan Cyprian.

== Explanatory palea ==
Explanatory palea (Old East Slavic: Толковая Палєя яже на иудея; in some works - the first edition of Palea) is a monument containing a retelling of the Old Testament with polemical, anti-Jewish interpretations, as well as with a large number of additions and comments, including extensive apocryphal material. The Explanatory Palea contains extensive theological reasoning, revealing the symbolic meaning of the Old Testament events as a prototype of the events of the New Testament; here one reads the polemical exhortations of Judaism. In places, the biblical story is interrupted by "natural science" reasoning. Biblical events are described from the creation of the world to the time of King Solomon.

=== Textology ===
More than 15 handwritten copies of the Explanatory Palea are known. The oldest of them - XIV - early XV centuries. The manuscript from the collections of the Russian National Library is the earliest illustrated copy of the monument.

=== Content ===
The explanatory palea is a complex compilation in which the biblical text is abundantly supplemented with apocryphal materials. The content of the Explanatory Palea (columns according to the edition of the Palea of 1406) is as follows:

- The story of the creation of the world (1-92), based, in particular, on the "Shestodnev" of the Bulgarian Exarch John and Severian of Gabala, which reads the apocryphal story of Satanael (73–78) and a description of real and fantastic creatures - the Alkonost bird, echinia, moray eels, phoenix, etc. (81–87).
- The story of the creation of man (90–123), which includes a description of the structure of the human body (114–123).
- The story of Adam and Eve and their fall into sin (123–163), interspersed with a "natural-scientific" digression on the nature of the fire and the atmosphere (131–138).
- The story of Cain and Abel (163–195) with reasoning about the relationship between the soul and the body (177–184).
- List of descendants of Adam (195–199)
- The story of Noah and the Flood (199–227), about the division of the earth between his sons, the pandemonium and the peoples who settled the earth after the division of languages (227–245).
- An extensive story about Abraham, based on the Bible with separate apocryphal additions (245–290)
- History of Isaac and his sons (290–336) with the story of Jacob's ladder (306ff.)
- History of Joseph (336–395).
- An extensive article on the covenants of the twelve patriarchs (401–474).
- History of Moses and the exodus of the Jews from Egypt (475–648). The story is told in detail, with separate apocryphal motifs. Here is a legend about twelve stones and their properties (546–556).
- Retelling of the biblical books of Joshua (648–680), Judges (680–726), Ruth (726–734).
- History of Saul and David (737-814)
- History of Solomon (814 - to the end).

=== Sources ===
The apocryphal material included in the compilation of the Explanatory Palea is represented by extracts from the Revelation of Abraham, the words of Athanasius of Alexandria about Melchizedek, the "Ladder" of John of Sinai, the Testaments of the Twelve Patriarchs, the Apocrypha about Moses and smaller extracts from apocryphal traditions. The compiler of the Explanatory Palea also referred to the works of Ephraim the Syrian ("Parenesis"), Pseudo-Methodius ("The Apocalypse of Pseudo-Methodius"), Cosmas Indicopleustes ("Christian Topography"), Epiphanius of Cyprus, "Hexameron" of the Bulgarian Exarch John and Severian of Gabala, etc.

The text of the Explanatory Palea reveals the echoes with the presentation of the Old Testament events contained in the Tale of Bygone Years. The textual closeness of the Explanatory Palea and the "Speech of the Philosopher" was explained differently. Palea was considered as a source of chronicle. Aleksey Shakhmatov suggested that, on the contrary, palea goes back to the letopis. According to Tvorogov, palea and letopis go back to a common source. One of the sources of the Explanatory Palea was an unknown monument, in which the biblical story was presented with a significant addition of apocryphal elements. This source was also used by the compiler of the "Speech of the Philosopher", which is part of the "Tale of Bygone Years".

The time of the compilation of the Explanatory Paley has not been established. Vasily Istrin assumed that it was created in the XIII century.

== Historical palea ==
Historical palea is a monument that tells the biblical story from the creation of the world to the time of King David, supplemented with apocryphal material. Unlike the Explanatory Palea, the Historical Palea does not provide interpretations and polemical reasoning. In handwritten lists it is called "The Book of Genesis of Heaven and Earth".

The sources of the Historical palea, in addition to the Bible, are the Slavic apocrypha, the Great Canon of Andrew of Crete, the words of John Chrysostom and Gregory the Theologian. The Russian text of the Historical Palea dates back to the Middle Bulgarian translation from Greek, made in the first half of the 13th century. A close Greek text is known, which is not the direct original of the translation.

The historical palea influenced the work of Yermolai-Erasmus on the Trinity, the Russian Chronograph (more precisely, its widespread edition of 1617) and a special revision of the Historical palea published by A. Popov under the title Abbreviated palea of the Russian edition.

== Chronographic palea ==
A Chronographic palea is a monument that combines the features of a chronograph and the actual palea. There are two types of Chronographic Paley - Full and Short.

=== Full ===
Full Chronographic palea is known in 6 listsх.

Consists of two parts. In the first part, right up to the description of the events of the time of King Solomon, the text is close to the Explanatory Palea, but includes additional materials: extracts from the Bible, apocryphal legends about Lamech, Melchizedek, Esau and Jacob, Moses, Solomon (apocryphal Judgments of Solomon, apocrypha about Solomon and Kitovras), excerpts from Byzantine chronographs - fragments from the Chronicle of George Hamartolos and, to a lesser extent, from the Chronicle of John Malala, from the Chronographic "Alexandria" of the second edition, Interpretations of Hippolytus on the Book of Daniel, etc. Starting with the story of the Israeli and Jewish kings, the Complete Chronographic palea goes back to the Chronograph. Also in this part, the text in many fragments approaches the Short Edition of the Chronographic palea, the Trinity Chronograph and the second edition of the Hellenic and Roman Chronicler.

It is assumed that the Full Chronographic Palea was created in the 15th century in Pskov

== Legacy ==
The compilation of biblical history, apocryphal stories, materials from ancient Christian and medieval Christian works, theological and individual "natural science" reasoning makes palea a universal monument, an encyclopedia of Russian medieval ideas about the structure of the universe, along with the works "About all things", "Depth Book", etc.
