= Domostroy =

16th-century Russian set of household rules

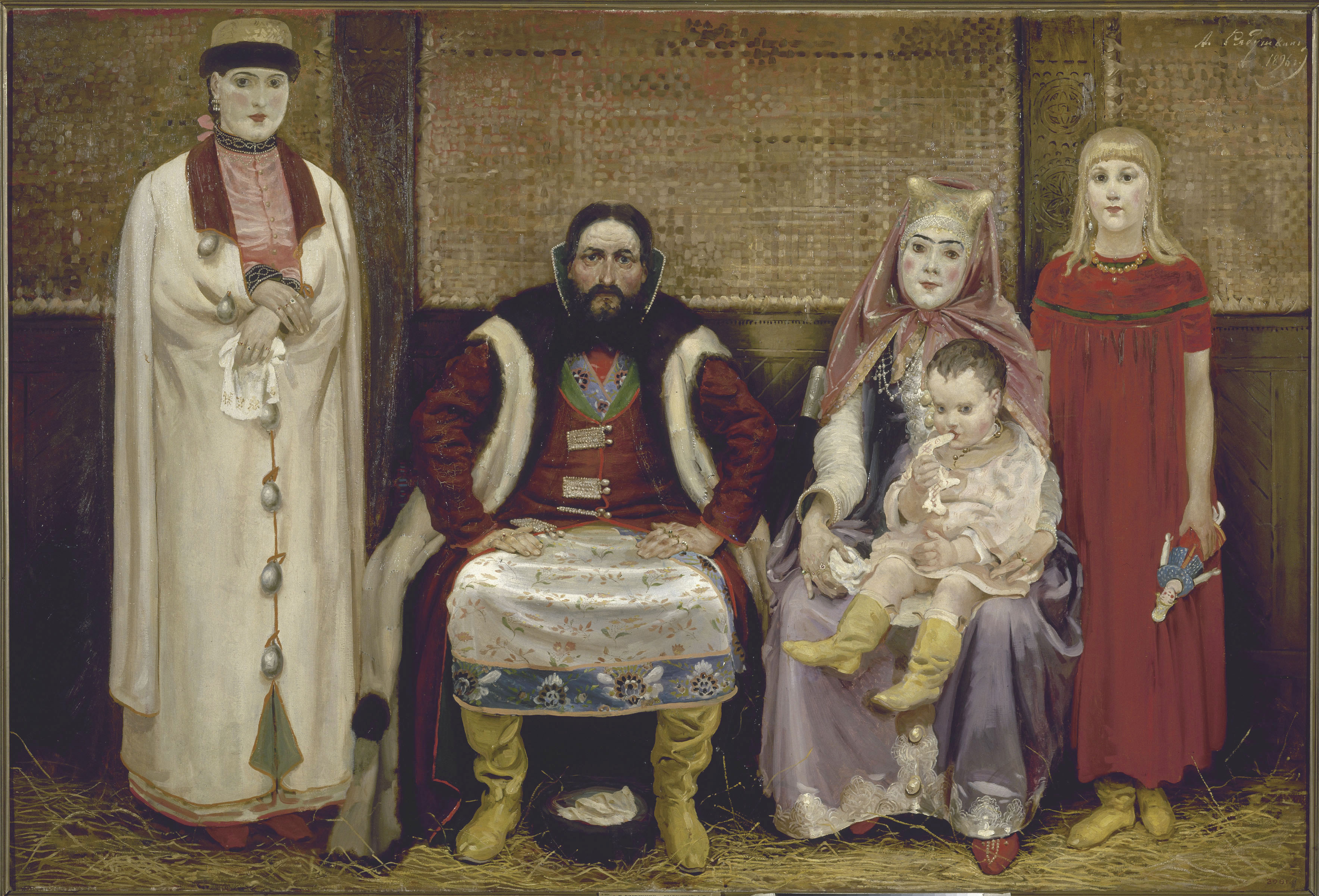
A 17th-century merchant family, painting by Andrei Ryabushkin (1894)

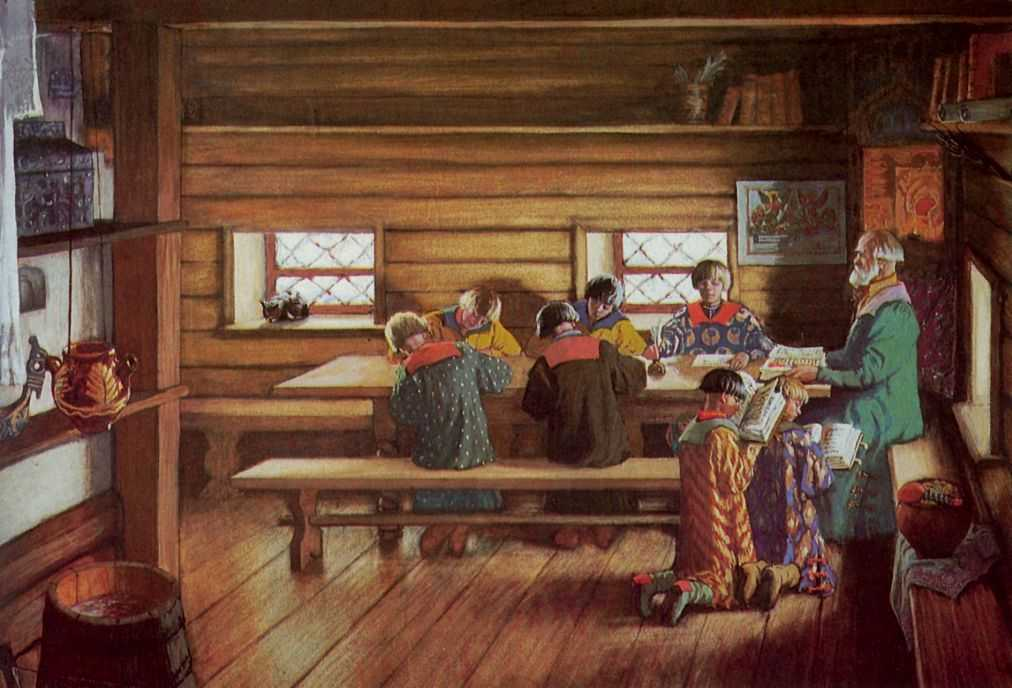
A School in Muscovite Russia, painting by Boris Kustodiev (1908)

Domostroy (Note: Also transliterated as Domostroi) (Russian: Домостро́й, IPA: [dəmɐˈstroj], lit. 'Domestic Order') is a 16th-century Russian set of household rules, instructions and advice pertaining to various religious, social, domestic, and family matters of Russian society. Core Domostroy values tended to reinforce obedience and submission to God, the tsar, and the church. Key obligations were fasting, prayer, icon veneration and the giving of alms.

== Description ==
Its real author is unknown, but the most widespread version was edited by the archpriest Silvester, an influential advisor to Ivan IV of Russia. The text does include an epistle entitled "64. A Father's Epistle Instructing His Son", which was written by Silvester instructing his son, Anfim, on some of the larger themes found within the Domostroy. An updated edition of the Domostroy was compiled by Karion Istomin during the late 17th century. To modern researchers, it is a precious account of Russian society and the life of wealthy boyars and merchants.

The first part of the Domostroy is written in Russian Church Slavonic and deals with religious matters, morals, and the education of children, while the second part is written almost entirely in the Russian vernacular.

Modern researchers tend to trace the origins of the Domostroy to the 15th century Novgorod Republic, where it could have been used as a kind of moral codex for the wealthy. As such, it has some quotations from the Book of Proverbs and other biblical texts, and from earlier Russian moral texts such as the Izmaragd and the Zlatoust, and from some western texts such as the Book of Christian Teachings (Czech) by Tomáš Štítný ze Štítného and Le Ménagier de Paris (French).

== Structure ==
The book is divided into 67 sections (in Silvester's version) dealing roughly with the following matters:

- Religious practices
- The relationship between the Russian people and the tsar
- Organization of the family
- Management of the household
- Culinary

== Legacy ==
In modern Russia, the term Domostroy has a pejorative meaning. It is used in such classic texts as Herzen's My Past and Thoughts and Turgenev's Fathers and Sons to refer to a traditionalist way of life associated with patriarchal tyranny, as exemplified by the following quotations: "A wife which is good, laborious, and silent is a crown to her husband." "Don't pity a youngling while beating him: if you punish him with a rod, he will not die, but become healthier."

== See also ==
- Medieval cuisine
- Patriarchy

== Bibliography ==
- Carolyn Johnston Pouncy: The "Domostroi" : rules for Russian households in the time of Ivan the Terrible, Ithaca 1994.
