= Volkhv =

Slavic soothsayer role

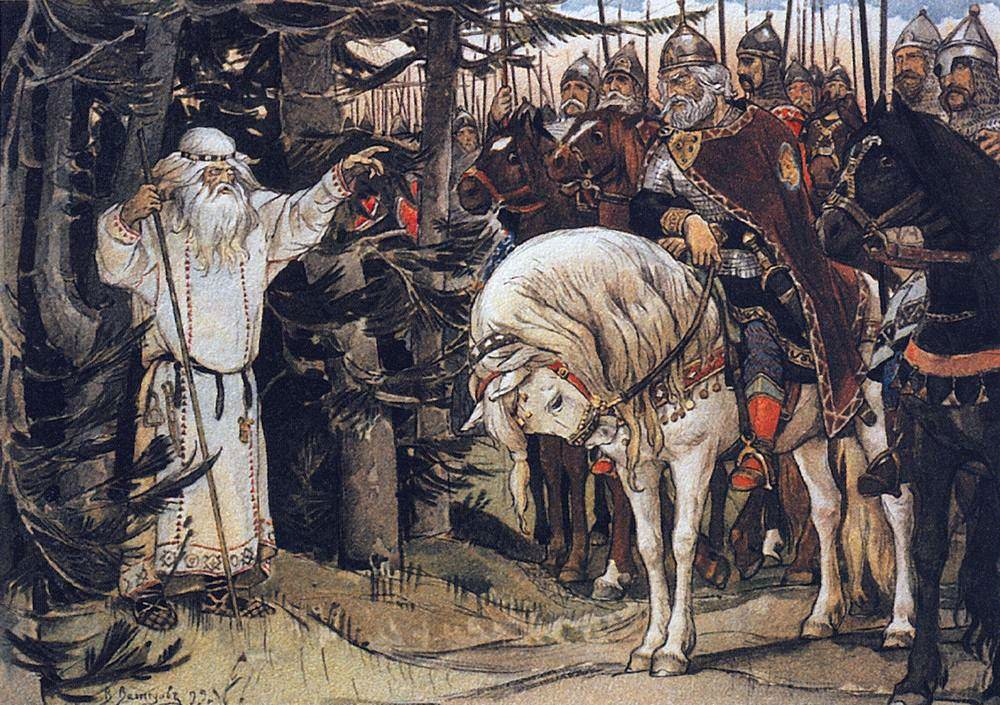
Oleg meets the volkhv. Painting by Viktor Vasnetsov.

A volkhv or volhv (Cyrillic: Волхв; Polish: Wołchw, translatable as wiseman, wizard, sorcerer, magus, i.e. shaman, gothi or mage) is a priest in ancient Slavic religions and contemporary Slavic Native Faith.

== Among the Rus' ==
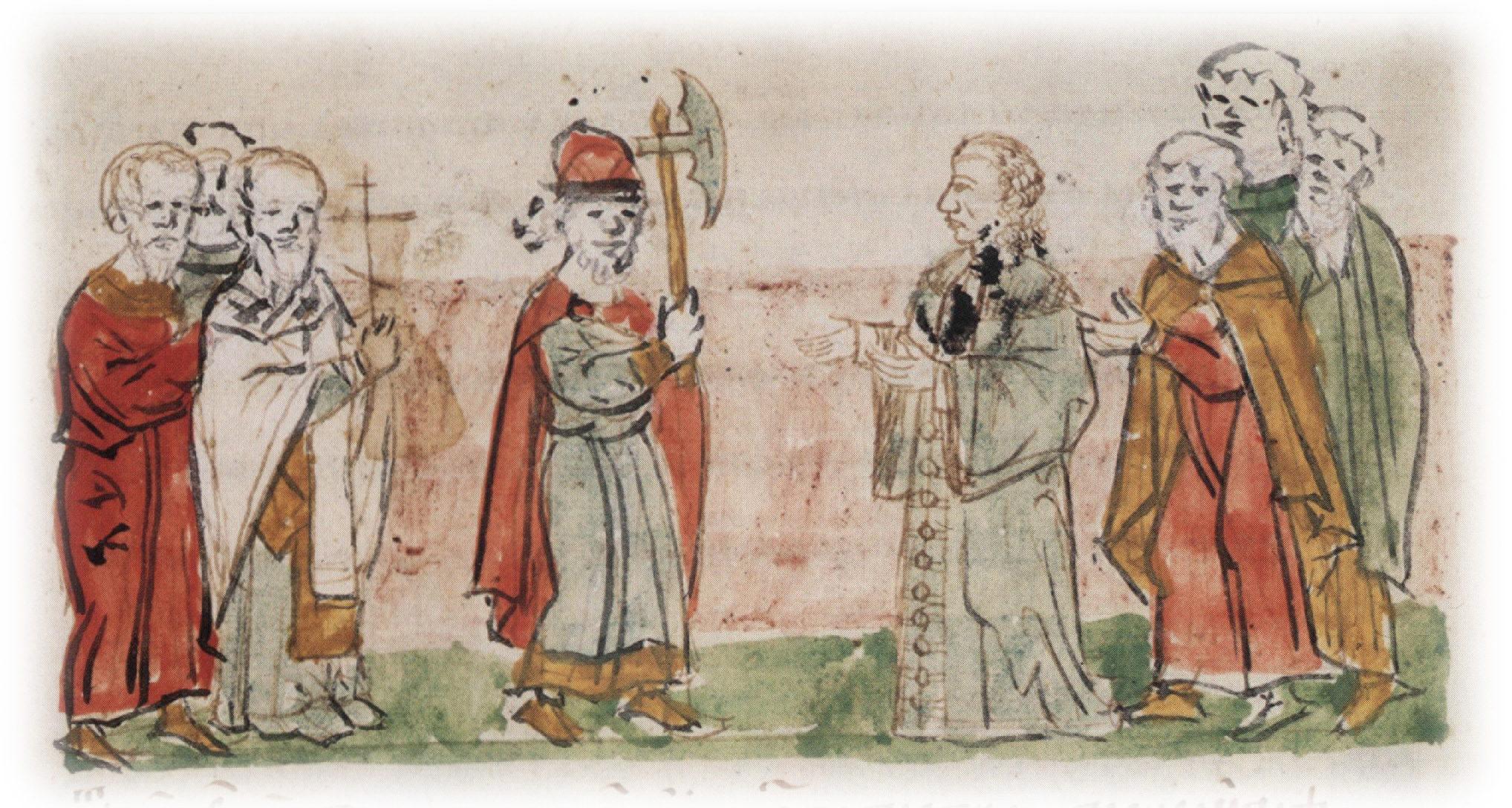
Gleb Svyatoslavich comes to a volkhv. Novgorod, 1071. Radziwiłł Chronicle

Volkhvs are attested among the early Rus' people. Volkhvs were believed to possess mystical powers, particularly the ability to predict the future. The first literary reference to a volkhv occurs in the Primary Chronicle under the year 912; there, a volkhv predicts Prince Oleg's death. With the adoption of Christianity, the pagan priests came under persecution and sometimes tried to channel social discontent against the Christian church. The name of the divination book "Volkhovnik" comes from the term "volkhv".

== In modern Slavic priesthood ==
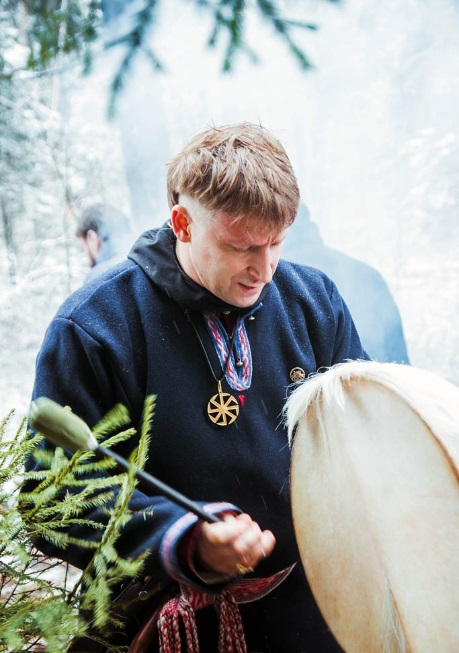
Russian Rodnover volkhv

In contemporary Slavic Native Faith, the volkhvs are those responsible for holding rites for worshipping the gods and leading communities and religious festivals. Volkhvs are the higher rank of the sacerdotal hierarchy, the lesser order being that of the zhrets. The latter are not necessarily shamans, and their function is merely to hold sacrifices (the word zhrets literally means "sacrificer", from Proto-Slavic *žьrti, and is cognate of Slavic words for "offering"). Though the majority of priests are males, most groups do not exclude women from the priesthood, so that a parallel female priesthood is constituted by the two ranks of zhritsa and vedunya ("seeress"). Prestige is not limited to male priests; a priestess, Halyna Lozko from Ukraine, is an acknowledged authority within the Slavic Native Faith movement.

In 2012, three Russian Rodnover organisations, the Union of Slavic Rodnover Communities, the Circle of the Pagan Tradition and the Circle of Veles, signed an "Agreement on Mutual Recognition of Priests", instituting a common priesthood and the criteria for the ordination of those wishing to become Slavic priests.

== See also ==
- Zhrets
- Gothi, the Germanic priests
- Slavic Native Faith
- Volkhovnik
