= Bylichka =

Genre of Russian folklore story

Bylichka (pl. bylichki; in Russian: быличка) is a type of story in Russian folklore about an allegedly true event involving a meeting with spirits. In contrast to the byvalschina, here the story is conducted with an emphasis on the personal testimony of the narrator.

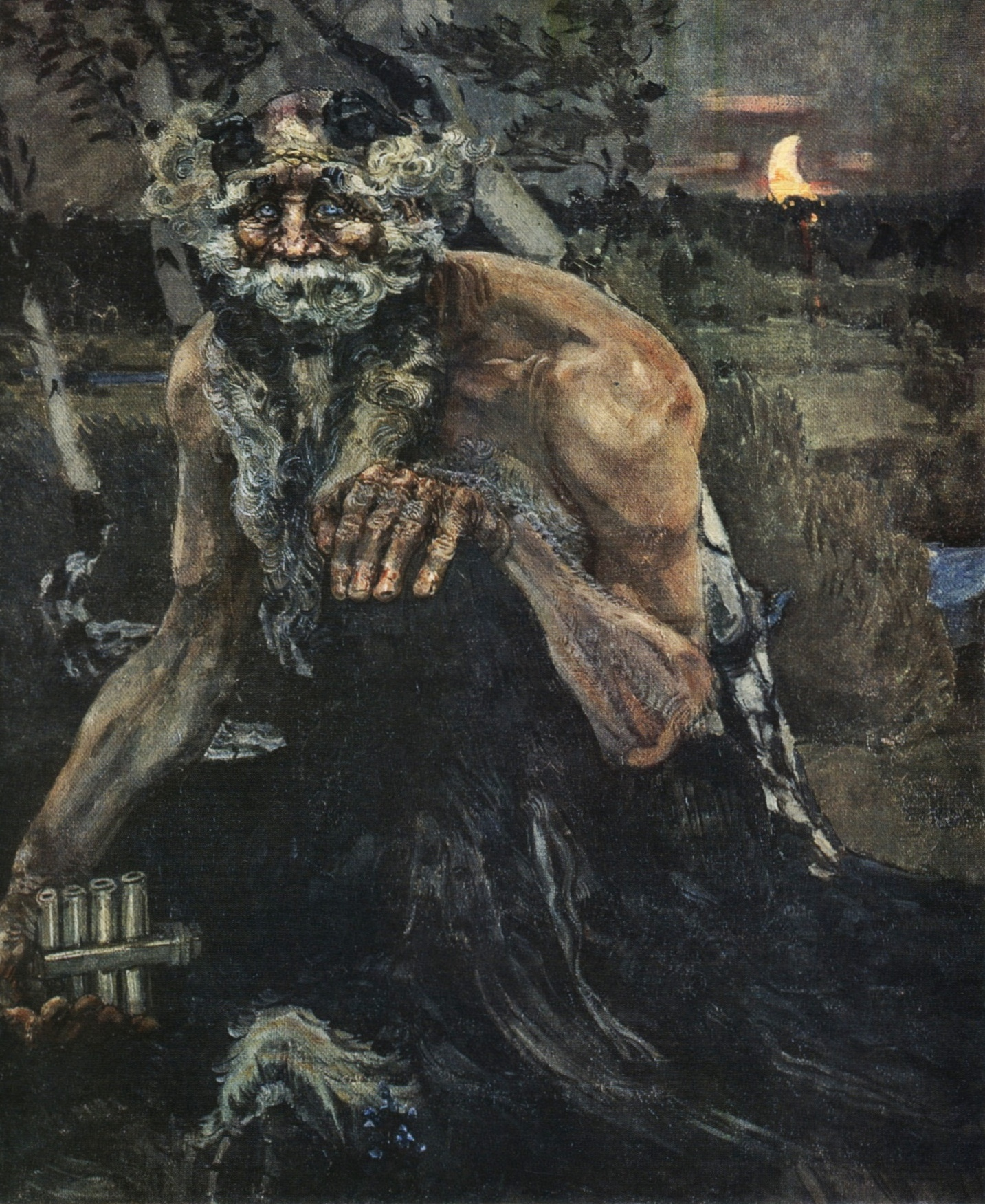
Vrubel's Pan (1899), with the deity of classical myth depicted in a landscape of typical North Russian countryside.

== See also ==
- Legend – Genre of storytelling that involves heroic humans
- Urban legend – Form of modern folklore
