= Gromnik (divinatory book) =

Gromnik or Gromovnik (from grom, meaning "thunder") is one of several astrological books that were in circulation in Russia and Serbia in the 15th and 16th centuries. A typical gromnik lists prognostications arranged by months (about the state of the weather, about future harvests, illnesses, wars, etc.) and drawn from such omens as thunder and earthquake. Sometimes notes “on the state of the moon right or hollow” are added to this work, indicating the significance of such signs at different times of the year. All surviving examples appear to have been created in Serbia.

"Gromniks" contain forecasts about natural disasters, crop yields, the behavior of wild animals and social phenomena (epidemics, unrest, wars in different countries) depending on the appearance of thunder in each of the twelve lunar months of the year. Judging by the "Gromnik" from the manuscript of the RSL. Muses. No. 921, which reproduces the table of the movement of the sun according to the signs of the zodiac, in the ancient Russian manuscripts of Gromnik, we could also talk about the months of the Julian, and not the lunar year.

The possibility assumed in "Gromnik" to have a judgment about the success of a person’s economic activity depending on the signs of thunder, despite the unsuitability of individual predictions for medieval Russia (and focused on the South Slavic climate), determined the popularity and prevalence of this type of fortune-telling literature (as indicated by the circle of interests of the Cyril scribe Euphrosynus, who rewrote the article “And this is the sign of thunder” (Old East Slavic: А сиѩ знамѣниѩ о грому, romanized: A siję znaměniję o gromu) in one of his collections).

Some editions of "Gromnik" presumably influenced the emergence of another fortune-telling book - "Molniyannik" (from molniya, 'lightning'). In this work, among the signs by which predictions are made, the outlines of lightning, the day of the month and the places where lightning strikes are named. Fortune-telling of the Molniyannik is timed to movements according to the signs of the zodiac of the Sun, and not the Moon. Some researchers see the reason for this in the syncretic appearance of the supreme deity of the clear sky Zeus (rendered in Slavic texts as Perun or Yarila-Dazhdbog), which combined the features of the thunder gods and the solar deity.

== Editions ==
- Саставио Стојан Новаковић, ed. (1877). Громовник [Примери књижевности и језика старога и српско-словенскога]. Београд: Државне штампариjе. pp. 524–527.

== See also ==
- Volkhovnik
