= Varvara Adrianova-Peretz =

Russian scholar (1888–1972)

Professor Varvara Pavlovna Adrianova-Peretz
- Варвара Павловна Адрианова-Перетц
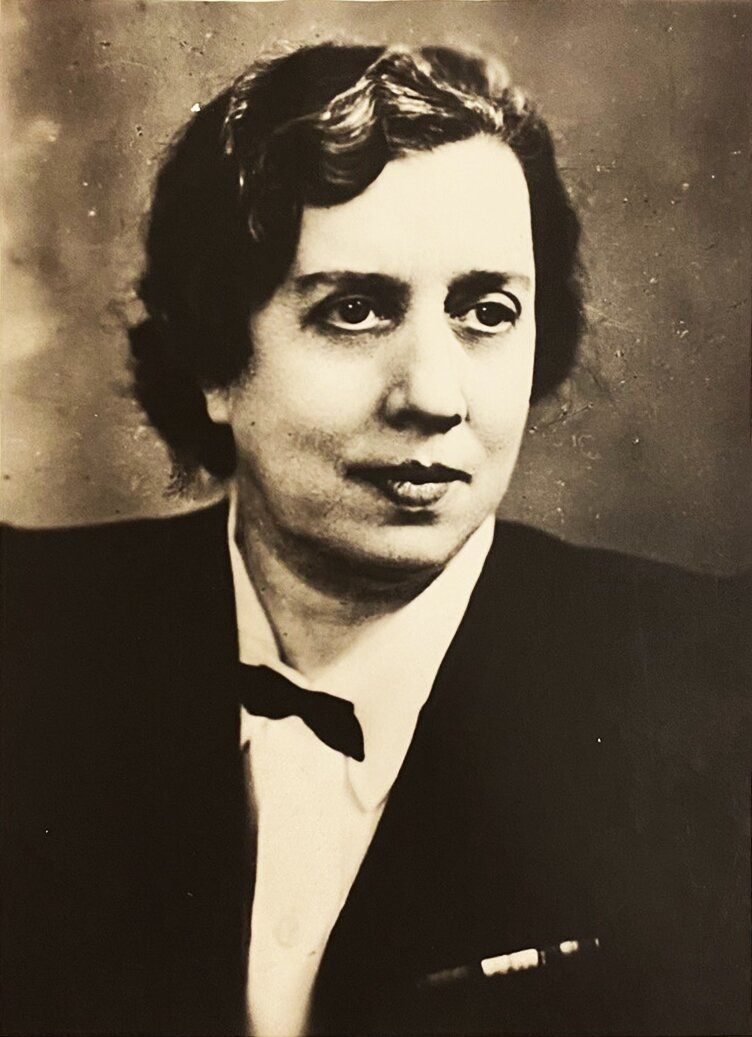
- Born: Varvara Pavlovna Adrianova; 12 May [O.S. 30 April] 1888; Nizhyn, Russian Empire
- Died: 6 June 1972 (aged 84); Leningrad, Soviet Union
- Occupations: Philologist, medievalist, writer
- Spouse: Vladimir Nikolayevich Peretz (m. 1908–1934)

Academic background
- Education: Kiev Imperial University of St. Vladimir
- Thesis: The Life of St. Alexis, a Man of God, in the Old Russian Literature, and Folk Narration (1917)
- Doctoral advisor: Vladimir Nikolayevich Peretz

Academic work
- Doctoral students: Dmitry Likhachov
- Resting place: Komarovo Cemetery; 60°12′15″N 29°47′59″E

Professor Varvara Pavlovna Adrianova-Peretz (Russian: Варвара Павловна Адрианова-Перетц; 12 May 1888 – 6 June 1972) was a Soviet and Russian philologist and medievalist specializing in Old Russian literature, folklore, and hagiography. She was a corresponding member of the All-Ukrainian Academy of Sciences (1926) and of the Academy of Sciences of the Soviet Union (1943).

== Education ==
Adrianova-Peretz was a student of Vladimir Nikolayevich Peretz, a researcher of Slavic folklore and one of the leading philologists of his time. She studied history and philology and received her bachelor's degree from Kiev Imperial University of St. Vladimir in 1912, followed by her Master's in 1914. A report by her during her studies, Philology and Its Methods inaugurated the 1907 edition of Peretz's popular seminar on medieval Russian literature. Her doctoral thesis, The Life of St. Alexis, a Man of God, in the Old Russian Literature, and Folk Narration was submitted in 1917 in Saint Petersburg, where she had moved after marriage to Peretz. It won her the Lomonosov Award of the Academy of Sciences.

== Career ==
After finishing her studies, Adrianova-Peretz taught at the First Petrograd Teachers Training Institute (1917–23) and at the State Institute of Art History (1921–30). She started work as a senior researcher in the Department of Old Russian Literature at the Institute of Russian Literature in 1934. The department was founded by Aleksandr Sergeyevich Orlov with assistance from Peretz. Orlov headed it during the initial period of her time at the department.

Adrianova-Peretz evacuated to Kazan during World War II, and began editing the multi-volume History of Russian Literature. She relied on several of her friends, who she had met at her husband's seminars, to assist her in the work and add their contributions. She also mentored Dmitry Likhachov during the period, introducing him to the circle of experts in the philological field across the country. She was elected a corresponding member of the Academy of Sciences in 1943.

Adrianova-Peretz took over as Head of the Department from 1947. She revived the practice of issuing an annual publication of The Works of the Department of Old Russian Literature. Together with Boris Grekov, Likachev and others, and under the tutelage of Sergey Ivanovich Vavilov, she edited and published the 15th century India travelogue of the Russian trader Afanasy Nikitin. Intended to be a gift to India's then prime minister Jawaharlal Nehru, whose proposed visit was cancelled, the publication became the precursor to an academic series of masterpieces from across the world called Monuments of Literature. Many Russian medieval texts - amongst them Military Tales in Ancient Russia, the Primary Chronicle of Kievan Rus' and The Tale of Igor's Campaign - were published alongside Russian translations of the works of Julius Caesar, Cicero, Pliny and Cato.

She was succeeded in 1954 by Likachev. Her personal book collection which contained many rare editions - together with Orlov's and Likachev's - formed the basis of the Department's library.

Adrianova-Peretz organized a regular seminar at the Philological department of Leningrad State University in the 1960s, along the lines of the famous seminar her husband had instituted. She continued to bring ancient manuscripts to publication until her death in 1972.

== Personal life ==
Adrianova-Peretz married Peretz, who had supervised her higher studies. Peretz was arrested on 11 April 1934, during the Great Purge, and in June was exiled to Saratov for three years. He died in exile on 24 September 1935. Her brother was also executed during the period. Towards the late 1940s, she began suffering from Alzheimer's disease. She died in 1972, and Likachev arranged for her burial in Komarovo cemetery.

== Bibliography ==
=== Selected articles and works ===
- The Gospel of Thomas in Old Ukrainian Literature, 1909
- On the Text of the Aristotle Gates, 1911
- On the History of the Legend of the Wandering Jew in Old Russian Literature, 1915
- The Life of St. Alexis, a Man of God, in Old Russian Literature and Folklore, 1917
- The History of Russian Hagiography of the Sixteenth Century, 1922
- Aesop’s Fables in Russian Humouristic Literature of the Eighteenth Century, 1929
- Symbolism of Freud’s Dreams in the Light of Russian Riddles, 1935
- Essays on the History of Russian Satirical Literature of the Seventeenth Century, 1935
- Essays on the Poetic Style of Old Russia, 1947
- Folk Poetic Creativity in the Time of Peasants’ and Citizens’ Uprisings of the Seventeenth Century, with B. N. Putilov, 1953
- On the Problem of Depicting of the Inner Man in Russian Literature of the Eleventh-Fourteenth Centuries, 1958
- Russian Democratic Satire of the Seventeenth Century, 1954
- A Man in the Didactic Literature of Old Russia, 1972
- Old Russian Literature and Folklore, 1974
