= Izmaragd =

14th-century Russian moral complication work

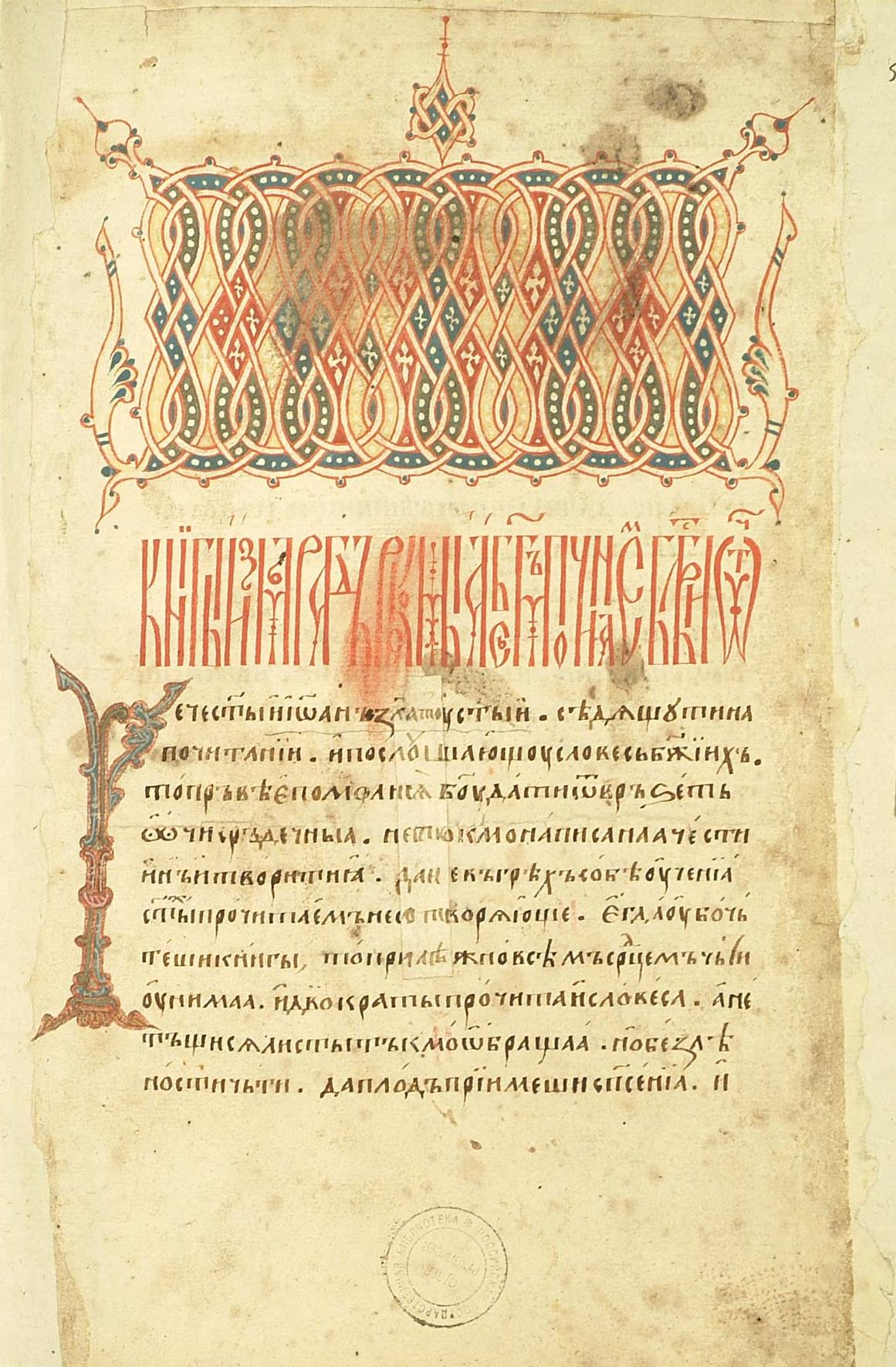
Beginning of a copy from the early 16th century

The Izmaragd (Russian: Измарагд, IPA: [ɪzmɐˈrakt], from Ancient Greek: σμάραγδος, romanized: smáragdos, lit. 'emerald') is a Russian moral compilation work, surviving in a number of manuscript copies. Written in codex form, the earliest written copy is from the 14th century. Depending on the version, it contains from 90 to 250 articles, mostly translated from Greek and adapted to Russian culture and context.

The themes covered by the work are various: "revering books", Christian virtues and sins, good and mean wives, education of children and household management. The Izmaragd was widely in use until the end of 17th century (20th century in some Old Believers communities), and heavily contributed to the influence of the Domostroy ('Domestic Ordr') in the 15th and 16th centuries.

== Sources ==
- "Измарагды" . Brockhaus and Efron Encyclopedic Dictionary (in Russian). 1906.
- «Измарагд» in the Great Soviet Encyclopedia (in Russian) – via Great Scientific Library
