= Applied folklore =

Branch of folkloristics

Applied folklore is the branch of folkloristics concerned with the study and use of folklore and traditional cultural materials to address or solve real social problems. The term was coined in 1939 in a talk by folklorist Benjamin A. Botkin who, along with Alan Lomax, became the foremost proponent of this approach over the next thirty years. Applied folklore is similar in its rationale and approach to applied anthropology and other applied social sciences, and like these other applied approaches often distinguishes itself from "pure" research, which has no explicit problem-solving aims.

Botkin's development of the approach emerged from his work on the collecting by the Federal Writers' Project of oral narratives of former slaves, when he worked for the Library of Congress. He saw the dissemination of these materials as having the potential to improve race relations in the United States and to combat prejudice. The abolition movement had similarly used the oral narratives of escaped slaves, such as those collected by William Still in his Underground Railroad Records, to draw support for their cause. Botkin's landmark work, Lay My Burden Down (1945) was the first American book to treat oral testimonies as historical evidence, and it was another thirty years before this became accepted practice. Botkin also worked with Quaker activist Rachel Davis DuBois to develop public programs to improve race and ethnic relations by incorporating cultural practices and materials into neighborhood events, such as festivals and block parties. Independent of this, Myles Horton, Zilphia Horton, Guy Carawan, Candie Carawan, and others at the Highlander Folk School in Tennessee incorporated folk song and folk dance into the training of civil rights activists, such as Rosa Parks and John Lewis.Botkin was more than just an academic folklorist; he was described as a scholar who rejected the constraints of academic responsibility. He embraced a broader range of sources from scholarly works to everyday cultural expressions. His refusal to limit folklore to traditionally acceptable formats helped shape the applied folklore movement by highlighting the significance of folklore in capturing the soul of a community.

In the 1960s, other American folklorists began to apply knowledge gained from folkloric sources to address social issues, most notably drawing on folk medicine in the teaching and practice of holistic and cross-cultural approaches to medicine and public health. Folklorists also began to work as consultants in city planning, gerontology, economic development, multicultural education, conservation, and other fields. David Hufford's, an American folklorist, work on folk and alternative medicine highlights how understanding these traditions can improve medical practice, especially by acknowledging the cultural contexts in which patients live. His research emphasizes that folk medicine practices may contain effective remedies not yet fully understood by conventional medicine.

Lynwood Montell, a well known folklorist, highlights several key areas where folklorists apply their expertise in his article Academics and Applied Folklore: Partners for the Future. Folklorists have contributed to historic preservation efforts and helped to protect architectural landmarks and cultural elements such as traditions and landscapes. Additionally, they have worked in arts programming, museums, and living history settings to enrich cultural interpretations and promote a deeper understanding of local history. Folklorists have also been involved in rural preservation, contributing to the conservation of farms and other rural landscapes while considering the impact of modernization on these areas.

== Sources ==
- Botkin, B.A., Lay My Burden Down. Chicago: University of Chicago Press, 1945.
- Jones, Michael Owen, ed., Putting Folklore to Use. Lexington: University of Kentucky Press, 1994.
- Goldstein, Diane, Once Upon a Virus: AIDS Legends and Vernacular Risk Perception. Logan: Utah State University Press: 2004.
- Hufford, David, Folklore Studies Applied to Health. Journal of Folklore Research 35, no. 3, 295–313, 1998.
- Montell, Lynwood, Academic and Applied Folklore: Partners for the Future. Core.ac.uk.
- Jackson, Bruce, Benjamin A. Botkin (1901-1975). The Journal of American Folklore 89, no. 351, 1976.
