= Volkhovnik =

Old Russian book of divination

The Volkhovnik (Russian: Волховник, lit. 'Book of Wizard'; from Old Russian волхвъ (volkhv) 'sorcerer, shaman, magus') was an Old Russian book of divinatory nature which included collections of signs and their interpretations. It appears in Russian lists of banned books dating from the 15th century onward. It is likely that the entry for the Volkhovnik in Russian lists is based on the Tabula prenostica Salomonis or a closely related text. No copies of any works with this title have survived, and it is known that most of the omens are widely recognized in Russian folk belief.

== Structure ==
Modern researchers characterize Volkhovnik as a collection of signs and divination. It is known that this book was divided into chapters, each of which was dedicated to a separate sign and had a corresponding title, for example:

- "Voronograi" (from voron, 'raven'; omens and divination by the cry of ravens, which since ancient times in Russia was considered an evil sign);
- "Kuroklik" ("Kuroglashennik"; divination by the crowing of roosters);
- "Ptichnik" ("Potochnik", "Bird charove"; by the cry and flight of birds in general);
- "Trepetnik" (signs associated with twitching of various parts of the body and other physiological phenomena);
- "Snosudets" ("Snovidets", "Sо́nnik", a dream dictionary);
- "Putnik" (signs associated with meetings);
- "Zeleinik", which was divided into:
  - "Travnik" (words, prayers, spells, or prophetic signs);
  - "Tsvetnik" (divination by flowers);
  - "Lechebnik" (a medical manual, most often with healing zagovory, spells, and descriptions of medicinal herbs and minerals).

Individual chapters of the Volkhovnik were distributed among the people as independent works, and the texts of some of them have survived to this day. Thus, although the full text of the book is unknown, researchers can form an idea of its individual parts.

== Content ==
An excerpt from the early Volkhovnik is given in his work by the historian Mykola Kostomarov, giving in some cases notes of incomprehensible expressions. In Russian:

...храм трещит [треск в стене], ухозвон, кости под колпиками свербят – путь будет; длани свербят – пенязи имат [Т. е. деньги иметь.]; очи свербят – плакать будут; воронограй, куроклик [пение курицы] – худо будет; утица крякнет, гусь гогочет, окомиг [дрожь в ресницах], огнь бучит [треск дров], пес воет, мышеписк [писк мышей], мышь порты [платье] грызет, кошка в окне мышьца держит, сон страшен, слепца встретить – изгорит нечто; огонь пищит, искра из огня, кошка мяукает – падет человек; свеща угаснет, конь ржет, вол ревет, трава шумит, древо скрипит, сорока поцекочет, дятел желна [долбит дерево], стенощелк [червячки в стенах], жаба воркует...

...the temple is cracking [crackling in the wall], the ear is ringing, the bones under the caps are itching – the way will be; the hands are itching – the penyazi imat [I.e., to have money]; the eyes are itching – they will cry; the voronograi, the kuroklik [singing of the hen] – it will be bad; the duck quacks, the goose cackles, the okomig [trembling in the eyelashes], the fire is beating [crackling of firewood], the dog howls, the mouse squeaks [squeaking of mice], the mouse ports [dress] nibbles, the cat in the window holds a mouse, the dream is terrible, to meet a blind man – something will burn out; the fire squeaks, a spark flies out of the fire, the cat meows – a person will fall; the candle goes out, the horse neighs, the ox roars, the grass makes a noise, the tree creaks, the magpie tickles, the woodpecker is yellow [hammering the tree], the wallworm [worms in the walls], the toad coos... (Note: So in the text. The sentence is not finished (note by Kostomarov).)

— Mykola Kostomarov, Essay on the home life and customs of the Great Russian people in the 16th and 17th centuries

Also, at the moment, the texts of several travniki and about 400 lists of lechebniki that were distributed as independent works are known in full. Lechebniks were constantly supplemented and improved up to the 16th century, because of which researchers believe that earlier lechebniks have not reached us, and fragments of those that are known are poorly read.

=== Other fortune-telling books ===
From other fortune-telling books, the Gromnik and Lunnik are known, which are not directly related to Volkhovnik. The Gromnik (from grom, 'thunder') interprets what exactly should be expected from thunderclaps at a particular time, sets out the omens of wars, diseases and weather. The Lunnik (from luna, 'moon') describes divination by the days of the lunar calendar. The set of prophecies concerning economic matters is given in an indefinite order, but with a stable list of significant events: the birth and upbringing of children, the treatment of livestock, arable land and garden, diseases and bloodletting, dreams, monetary transactions, trade; there are no military or state affairs. Both books were also widely known in Russia, and probably were translations of South Slavic works (there are many Serbisms in the text, including lexical ones).

== See also ==
- Volkhv
- Fortune-telling
- Witchcraft

== Sources ==
- Afanasyev, Alexander (1982). "Trials about sorcerers and witches". Tree of Life: Selected articles. Preparation of the text and commentary. Yuri Medvedev, intro. article by B. P. Kirdan (in Russian). M.: Sovremennik. p. 464.
- Jan Los (1892). Volkhovnik. St. Petersburg: Brockhaus and Efron Encyclopedic Dictionary: in 86 t. (82 t. and 4 add.). Vol. VII.
- Приметы (in Russian). St. Petersburg: Brockhaus and Efron Encyclopedic Dictionary: in 86 t. (82 t. and 4 add.). Vol. VII. 1890–1907.
- Rosenthal, Bernice Glatzer (1997). The Occult in Russian and Soviet Culture. Cornell University Press. ISBN 978-0-8014-8331-8.
- Ryan, W. F. (1990). "What Was the "Volkhovnik"? New Light on a Banned Book". The Slavonic and East European Review. 68 (4): 718–723. ISSN 0037-6795.
- Speransky, Mikhail (1910). Abnegated Books // Orthodox Theological Encyclopedia / Ed. Nikolai Glubokovsky. Vol. XI. - Stb. 405-433 (in Russian). St. Petersburg: Appendix to the spiritual journal "The Wanderer".
