= Chronographia =

Chronographia (Greek: Χρονογραφία), meaning "description of time", and its English equivalents, Chronograph and Chronography, may refer to:

- Chronographiae of Sextus Julius Africanus, covering events from Creation to 221
- Chronographia, part of the Chronicon of Eusebius of 325
- Chronograph of 354, covering events from Creation to 353
- Chronographia Scaligeriana, work of c. 530
- Chronographia of John Malalas, covering c. 491 – c. 578
- Chronographia of Theophanes the Confessor, covering events from 284 to 813
- Chronographikon syntomon of Nikephoros I of Constantinople (died 828)
- Chronographia tripartita of Anastasius Bibliothecarius, written in 807–874
- Bulgarian Chronograph, anonymous (10th century)
- Chronographia of Michael Psellos, covering events from 976 to the 1070s
- Chronica sive Chronographia of Sigebert of Gembloux (died 1112)
- Chronographia of Gerald of Wales, written in 1166 to 1176
- Chronographia of Johannes de Beke, written in 1346
- Chronographia interminata of Conrad of Halberstadt the Younger, written in 1355
- Chronographia regum Francorum, written in 1405–1429
- Chronographia Augustensium of Sigismund Meisterlin, written in 1456

== Sources ==
- Dunphy, Graeme, ed. (2010). Encyclopedia of the Medieval Chronicle. Leiden: Brill. ISBN 90-04-18464-3.

== See also ==
- Demetrius the Chronographer
