= Pskov Republic =

Russian city-state (1348–1510)

Lord Pskov Господин Псков
- 1348–1510
- Coat of arms

- Pskov Republic in 1400
- Capital: Pskov
- Common languages: Russian (Old Pskov dialect)
- Religion: Russian Orthodoxy
- Demonym: Pskovian
- Government: Mixed
- History
  - Established: 1348
  - Disestablished: 1510
Preceded by	Succeeded by
Novgorod Republic	Grand Principality of Moscow
- Today part of: Russia

The Pskov Republic (Russian: Псковская республика, romanized: Pskovskaya respublika), formally known as Lord Pskov (Russian: Господин Псков), was a city-state in northwestern Russia. Its capital city was Pskov and its territory was roughly equivalent to modern-day Pskov Oblast.

Pskov gained its formal independence from the Novgorod Republic in 1348. As a sovereign republic, Pskov maintained complete internal self-governance, developed distinct legal system and defended its borders against external threats throughout the 14th century. From 1399, it recognized the political suzerainty of the Grand Principality of Moscow, culminating in its formal incorporation into the Russian State in 1510. The legal traditions of the Pskov Republic heavily influenced the development of the Russian law.

== History ==
=== Origins ===
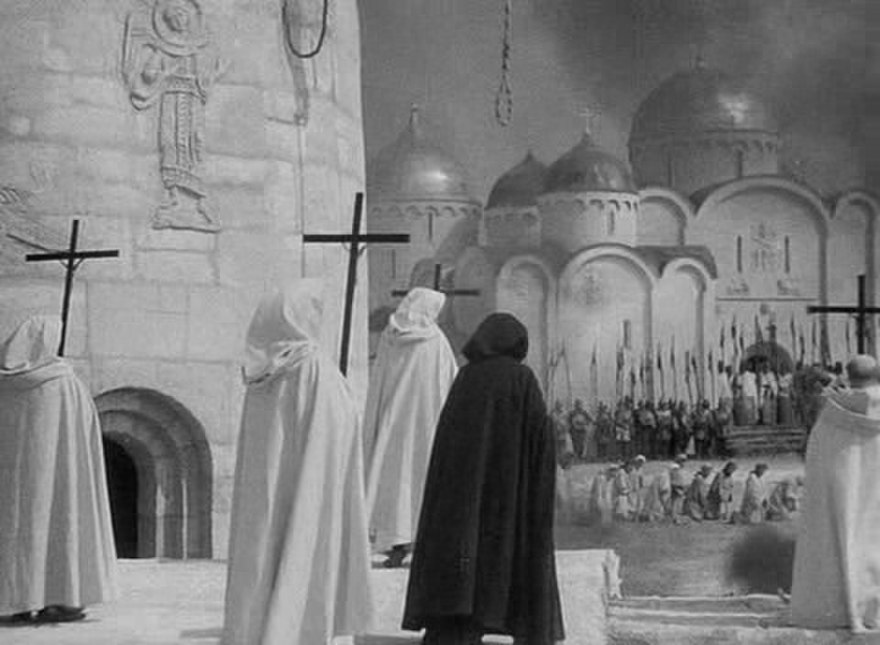
The Teutonic Knights in Pskov, frame from Sergei Eisenstein's film Alexander Nevsky (1938)

Following the establishment of the Novgorod Republic in northern Rus' during the 12th century, the city of Pskov and its dependent territory became part of the Novgorod Republic, but it continued to enjoy self-government under the supervision of a posadnik, or chief executive, that was appointed by Novgorod. Pskov had the status of a borough (Russian: пригород, romanized: prigorod), but was given the unique right to have boroughs of its own, with Izborsk being the most ancient among them. The first period of self-declared independence lasted from 1228 to 1242, ending when the city was temporarily annexed by the Livonian Order. After being liberated by Aleksandr Nevsky, the city pledged its fealty to the grand prince and Novgorod. Due to Pskov's leading role in the struggle against the Livonian Order, its influence grew significantly. The long service of Daumantas (r. 1266–1299), and especially his victory in the Battle of Rakvere in 1268, ushered in a period of significant autonomy, as well as a state of peace with the Livonian Order. The expansion of the Grand Duchy of Lithuania began to extend to Pskov when Grand Duke Gediminas responded to the Pskovites' request to send a prince in 1323.

Prince Aleksandr of Tver was granted sanctuary by the Pskovites in 1327 after he had fled Tver following an anti-Tatar uprising that was subsequently crushed by a punitive force dispatched by the khan of the Golden Horde. Aleksandr was appointed as the prince of Pskov and an agreement was reached in which the Pskovites promised "not to hand him over to the Russian princes". At the behest of Ivan I of Moscow, the head of the Russian Orthodox Church excommunicated Aleksandr as well as the people of Pskov. Aleksandr then fled to Lithuania and, after a treaty was signed between Pskov and the head of the church, the ban was lifted. Aleksandr later returned to Pskov in 1331 and he once again served as their prince until he went to the Horde in 1337 to recover the principality of Tver.

In August 1348, Magnus IV of Sweden captured the key fortress of Orekhov located at the eastern end of the Neva. The Pskovites sent a small detachment and took advantage of the situation by only agreeing to accompany the Novgorodian army on the condition that Pskov would be formally granted its independence. Novgorod sent an allied force to lay siege to the fortress and signed the Treaty of Bolotovo on the way to Orekhov. As per the terms of the treaty, the posadniki of Novgorod no longer had any administrative or judicial function in Pskov and the law-courts of the archbishop of Novgorod would only be run by representatives chosen by the Pskovites. In return, Pskov pledged to aid Novgorod in the event that it was attacked. Despite this, the Pskovites refused to aid Novgorod in its siege of Orekhov and the detachment left.

The signing of the Treaty of Bolotovo has traditionally been regarded as the date when Pskov's independence was sealed; however, some modern historians have argued that the treaty was concluded earlier or that there is little evidence of Pskov's dependence on Novgorod in the 12th and 13th centuries. Scholars have variously dated the treaty between 1329 and 1342. Valentin Yanin argued that the treaty was concluded in 1329, only confirming previous agreements. According to Yanin, Pskov was independent as early as 1137 and relations between the two cities were based on contracts. Despite this, there is no trace of the Pskov magistrates' activities or legislation until the 14th century. Sergei Beletzkiy has shown that Pskov's original seals appeared in the 14th century and that their design followed that of Novgorod's seals.

=== 14th century ===
In 1341, the chronicle of Novgorod states that the Pskovites had "betrayed themselves" (predashasia) to Lithuania when they invited Grand Duke Algirdas to serve as a prince of the republic. Following the death of the Lithuanian governor in April 1349, the Pskovites decided to cut ties with Algirdas and his son Andrei. Algirdas declared war on Pskov but, due to a string of military defeats earlier, he was limited to arresting Pskovian merchants and sending Andrei to raid the territory of Pskov. Although there is no mention of a Muscovite governor arriving in Pskov or negotiations with Moscow at the time in any of the sources, Pskov likely received military support from Moscow, and by the end of the decade, was within Moscow's sphere of influence. Simeon of Moscow was also able to establish a dominant position in Novgorod, and as a result, he was able to eliminate Lithuania's influence in northwest Russia for the time being. In 1352, the Black Death reached Pskov and subsequently spread to the rest of Russia; the chronicles of Novgorod and Pskov say that hundreds died every day, but it also weakened the ascendancy of Moscow for some time.

During the second half of the 14th century, the Pskov Republic frequently invited Lithuanian service princes to fill the office of the prince. governance, This changed after Grand Duke Vytautas of Lithuania signed the Treaty of Salynas with the Teutonic Knights in 1398, in which he promised to help them conquer Pskov, while the Teutons promised to help Lithuania conquer Novgorod. That same year, Vytautas sheltered Tokhtamysh in exchange for military assistance. Vyatautas was promised aid in conquering Moscow and he joined Tokhtamysh in his war against Temür Qutlugh, but they were decisively defeated at the Battle of the Vorskla River in 1399. After Prince Ivan Andreyevich left the city, Pskov sent emissaries to Grand Prince Vasily I of Moscow requesting a prince, and from then on, the prince of Pskov was a governor or viceroy (namestnik) under the overlordship of the grand prince. The same year, Moscow signed an agreement with the prince of Tver, which consolidated cooperation between the two principalities.

=== 15th century ===
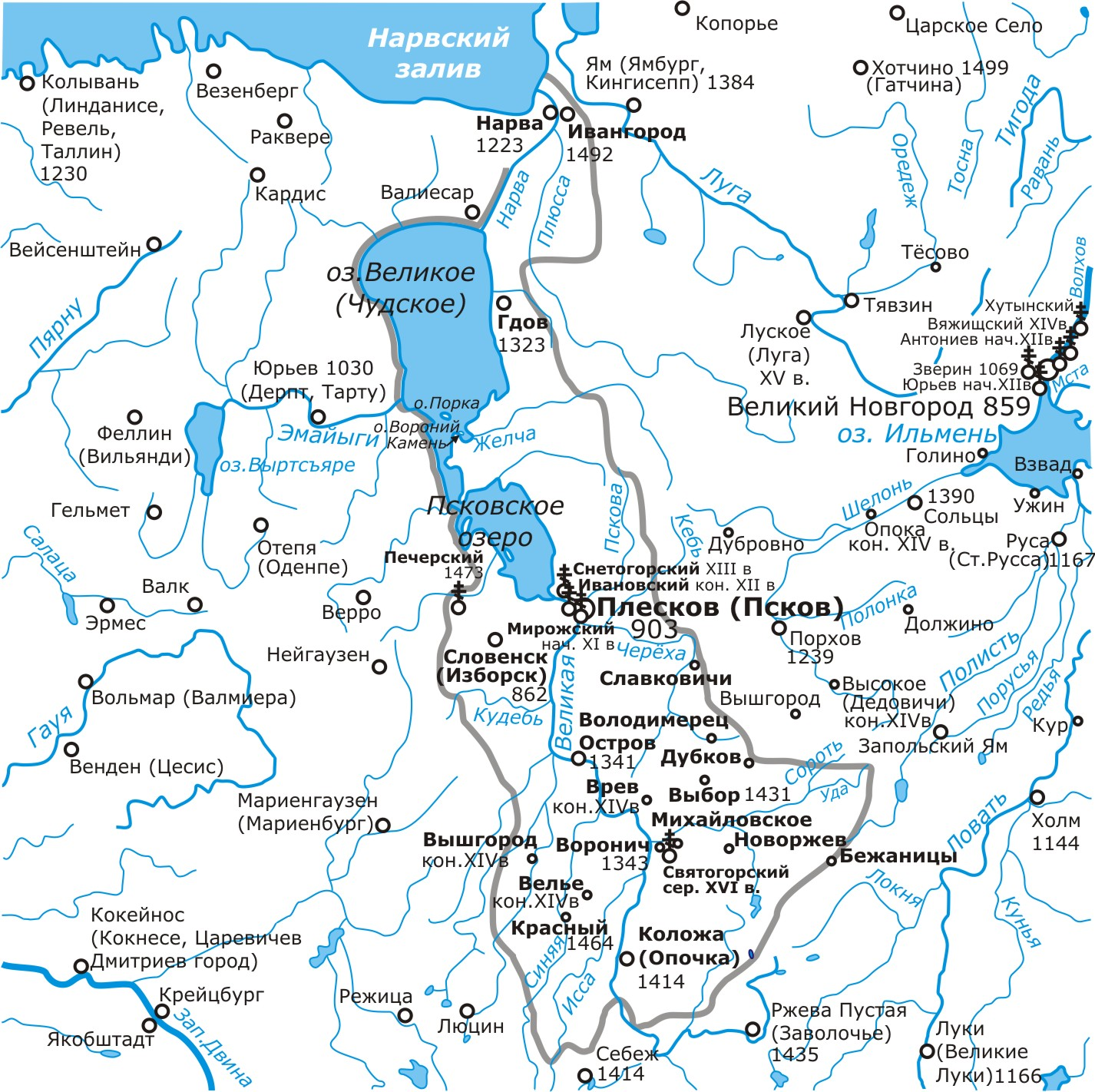
Pskov Republic in 1462

Lithuania attempted to seize Pskov's territories, resulting in a failed offensive against the Pskov Republic in 1406. Grand Prince Vasily I of Moscow sent troops to aid Pskov, leading to a border war between Lithuania and Moscow until 1408. The two sides stopped fighting as Vasily had to battle a Tatar invasion led by Edigu in 1408, while Vytautas joined the forces of Władysław II Jagiełło to inflict a devastating defeat on the Teutonic Knights at the Battle of Grunwald in 1410. Relations between Lithuania and Moscow resumed a more peaceful course; however, both sides continued to struggle for influence in the political affairs of Pskov and Novgorod. Finally, in 1449, Grand Prince Vasily II signed treaties with Casimir IV Jagiellon that delineated their spheres of influence, with Casimir recognizing Pskov and Novgorod as dependencies of Moscow.

In the first half of the 15th century, the recognition of the suzerainty of the Muscovite grand prince was voluntary. The city was also able to conclude treaties with other countries. The 1417 peace treaty with the Livonian Order states: "We have been sent", declared the Pskov ambassadors, "by our authorities, the mayor and all Pskov (posadnik pskovskii i ves' Pskov), from the patrimony of our Lord, Russian prince (iz otchiny nashego gospodina, russkogo kniazia)..." Although the grand prince was recognized as the suzerain (gospodin), and Pskov as his "patrimony" (otchina), the Pskovites did not need his approval for the treaty. The status of Pskov until the mid-15th century has been compared to that of the free cities of the Holy Roman Empire. Pskov did not pay regular taxes to the suzerain, nor was it dependent on him for judicial matters. However, the Muscovite court adopted the title of sovereign (gosudar) in the mid-15th century to reflect the grand prince's claim to hold supreme power over the Russian lands. Vasily II succeeded in having Pskov recognize his title of gosudar. In addition, the grand prince's governor was now required to swear an oath not only to him but also to his descendants. Pskov's former contractual relationship with the grand prince was superseded by hereditary Muscovite rule. Pskov also lost the right to expel unpopular governors.

Grand Prince Vasily II appointed the prince Vladimir Andreyevich as his governor in 1462 without requesting permission from Pskov first. After his death the same year, the Pskovites dismissed Vladimir, and Grand Prince Ivan III reached an agreement with the city in which he promised to not appoint a new governor without the permission of Pskov, while the Pskovites promised not to dismiss a governor without the permission of the grand prince. Five years later, Ivan appointed Fyodor Yuryevich as his governor and demanded that Pskov grant his governor the right to appoint representatives in all twelve boroughs, rather than the seven he had been allowed up to that point. Pskov was forced to accept the demand, and some scholars view the enactment of the Pskov Judicial Charter the same year as an attempt to define the distribution of judicial authority between the city and the grand prince.

Starting in the 1460s, Pskov's foreign policy gradually fell under the control of the grand prince. It is likely that the grand prince approved the terms of treaties with neighboring countries, while Pskov's authorities continued to handle minor trade disputes. For instance, in a letter dating to 1463–1465 and addressed to the authorities in Riga, the prince, posadniki, boyars, merchants and "all Pskov" protested against the offenses faced by two Pskovite merchants in the city, without any reference to the grand prince's decision. However, treaties between Moscow and other countries show that Pskov was no longer an active participant in international affairs. In his 1494 peace treaty with Lithuania, Ivan III called Pskov his patrimony and guaranteed maintaining trade and justice in the city. Although Pskov is indicated to have already lost its independence in the second half of the 15th century, its local administration and legal system remained intact. The clearest evidence of its loss of independence was a new seal introduced in 1468–1469 that bore the legend "votchina of Grand Prince Ivan Vasil'evich".

=== 16th century ===
In 1501, the armies of Pskov and Moscow were defeated in the Battle of the Siritsa River by the Livonian Order, but the city withstood a subsequent siege. In the summer of 1503, the city concluded a six-year truce with the Livonian Order on the order of the grand prince of Moscow. In the treaty, "tsar" Ivan III of Russia confirms an agreement in Novgorod by the representatives of the "respected prince of Livland, Walter von Plettenburg" on one side and Pskov on the other. The title of tsar was used as part of Ivan's policy to gain international recognition as an equal to the emperor. This was one of the last treaties concluded by Pskov before it completely lost its autonomy.

Upon becoming the grand prince, Vasily III continued his father's policy of annexing the other remaining Russian states. In the autumn of 1509, he visited Novgorod, where he received complaints from the Pskov veche against the Muscovite governor of the city. At first, Vasily encouraged complaints against the governor, yet soon after, he demanded that the city abolish its traditional institutions, including the removal of the veche bell. From that point on, Pskov was to be ruled exclusively by his governors and officials, and on 13 January 1510, the veche bell was removed and transported to Moscow.

During an official visit to Pskov, Vasily held a large reception that was attended by city officials, merchants and representatives of other classes. At the height of the reception, he had them arrested. In total, around 300 families were deported and replaced with loyalists, as Vasily sought to remove any potential opposition to his direct rule. Following its incorporation into the centralized Russian state, the city of Pskov and the lands around it continued to prosper, preserving some of its economic and cultural traditions that may have even spread to Moscow. At the time of its incorporation, the city numbered 6,500 households, or about 30,000 people, according to the chronicle of Pskov.

== Geography ==
Despite being a city-state, Pskov, like Novgorod, extended over a large amount of territory. It covered the territory between Novgorod and the lands inhabited by the Baltic peoples, reaching the Gulf of Finland. As a result of its geographic position, Pskov made frequent contact with Lithuania and the Teutonic Knights. The Hanseatic League also had an office in Pskov, which allowed the city to have commercial contacts with distant states. Pskov did not have a relatively empty hinterland, which prevented it from engaging in expansionism unlike Novgorod, which had a vast hinterland in the Russian North.

== Society ==
The Pskov Republic had well-developed farming, fishing, blacksmithing, jewellery-making and construction industries. Exchange of commodities within the republic itself and its trade with Novgorod and other Russian cities, the Baltic region, and Western Europe cities made Pskov one of the biggest handicraft and trade centers of Rus'. As opposed to the Novgorod Republic, Pskov never had big feudal landowners: estates were smaller and even more scattered than of those in Novgorod. The estates of Pskovian monasteries and churches were much smaller as well. Some land was owned by smerdy while other izorniki did not own the land they worked and were obliged to pay rent – between a quarter and a half of the harvest. A farmer who had no debts to his landlord could leave him only on a certain day of the year.

The rural population was deprived of political rights as landowners were concentrated in towns. As late as the 1480s, Pskovian peasants were referred to as smerdy, even though the term had disappeared from documents in other parts of Russia, reflecting the social polarization. Representatives of the zemtsy (private landowners) held the positions of hundredmen and vicar of the archbishop, while merchants held the positions of merchant and trader elders. The lower classes (chyornyye lyudi) selected street (ulichanskiye) elders.

== Politics ==
=== Government ===
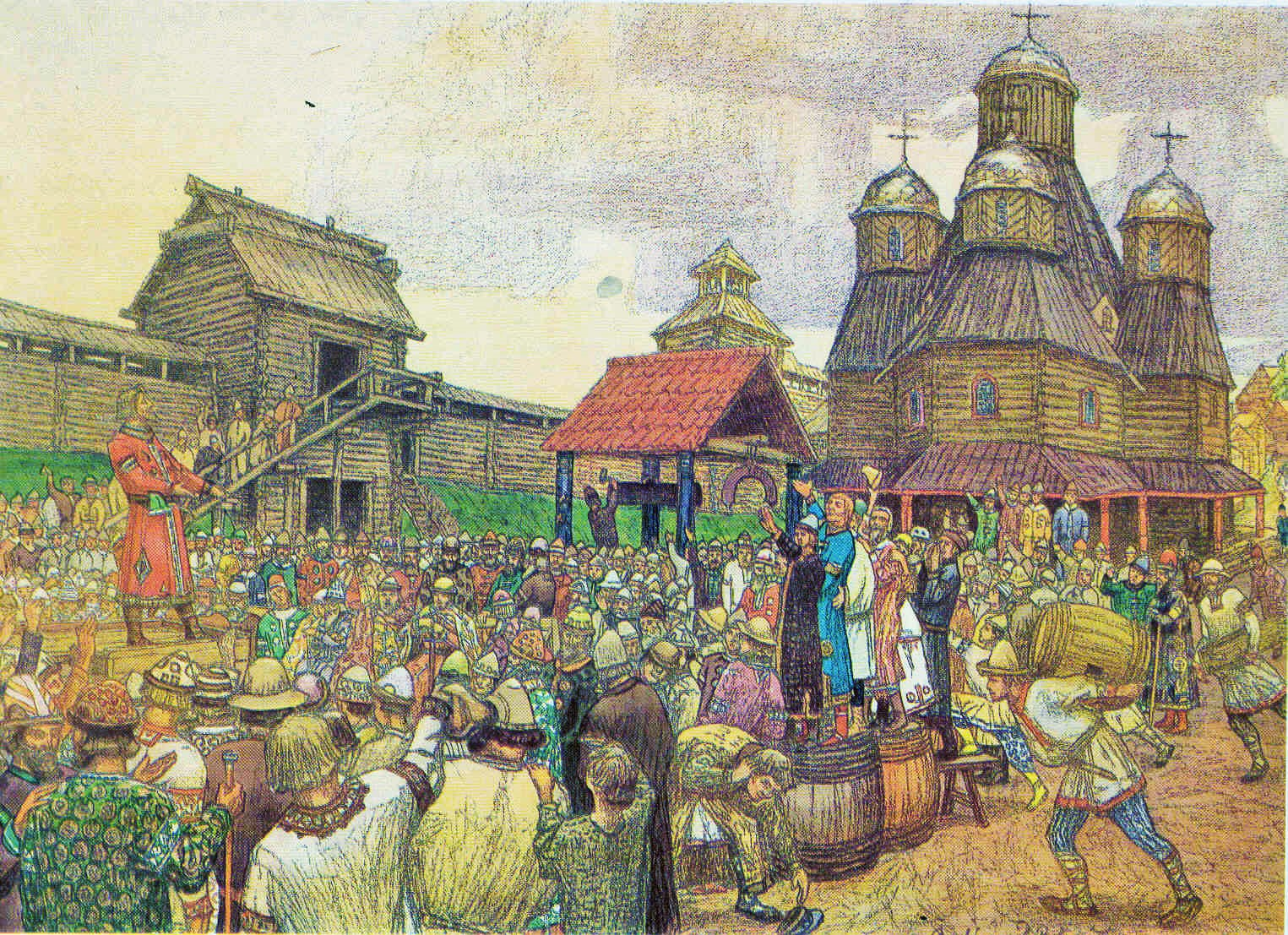
Pskov Veche by Apollinary Vasnetsov (1908–1909)

In contrast to the absolute power of princes in the structure of the Russian principalities, the republics of Novgorod and Pskov had structures that counterbalanced and complemented each other. The government of the Pskov Republic consisted of the veche (popular assembly), posadnichestvo (mayoralty) and the prince (directly or through a viceroy). Mayors (posadniki) from all parts of the city, together with one or more lord mayors and former mayors formed the Council of Lords (sovet gospod, boyarskiy sovet), which was the main executive organ of the state. The mayoral offices (posadniki) became a privilege of several noble (boyar) families. The first references to posadniki appear in the chronicle of Pskov in the early 14th century. Former posadniki kept their title, and so the incumbent posadnik was known as the stepennyi posadnik.

Although considered to be a republic, the head of state remained the prince; however, power was shared with the local authorities, and so a particular prince could be dismissed. The best documented duties of the prince include him commanding the army and his judicial office. As Pskov did not have its own princely dynasty, the prince was invited from Lithuania and then Moscow and other Russian principalities. The prince of Pskov was more dependent on the grand prince compared to the prince of Novgorod, and so princes were often recruited from the ranks of service princes who had been accepted into the service of the grand prince, especially after 1399. The role of the prince in Pskov has been compared to that of a podestà or condottiero in Italian cities. The prince was a military leader, accompanied by his retainers, but he also fulfilled judicial and police functions.

The legal code of Pskov, known as the Pskov Judicial Charter, was enacted by its veche in 1397, with redactions until 1467. The preamble says it was approved "by all Pskov at the assembly meeting" (vsem Pskovom na vechi). Among medieval Russian cities, only Pskov and Novgorod had their own law codes. Pskov's legal code is regarded as a monument of Russian law. The principal subjects of the code included commercial law, criminal law, debts, evidence, inheritance, the law of procedure, the legal position of certain peasant classes, as well as the rights of certain officials. The Charter of Pskov was an important source for the Sudebnik of 1497 under Ivan III, the first collection of laws of the newly unified state.

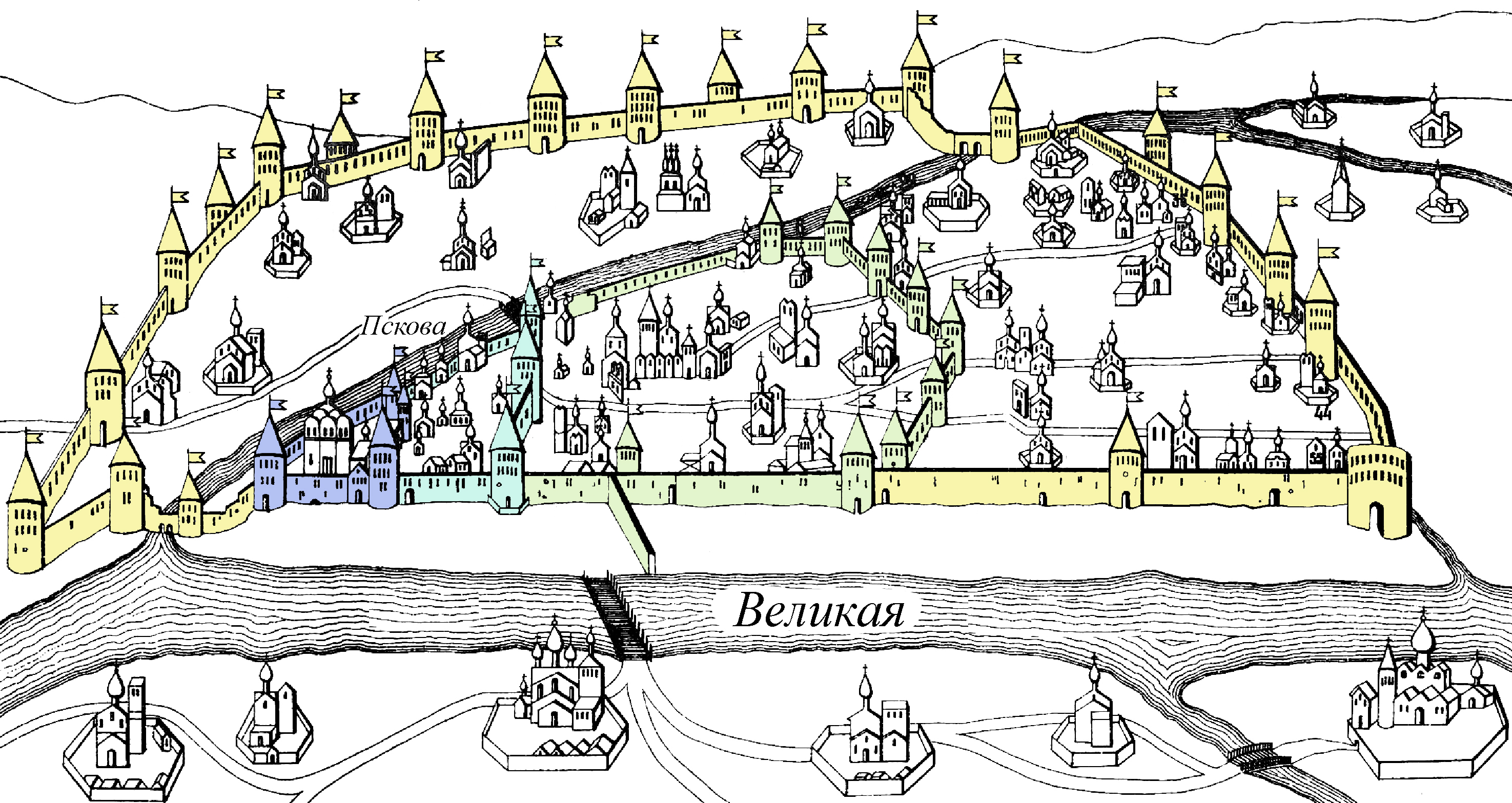
Growth of Pskov: blue – the citadel (Krom), light blue – Dovmont's city wall, green – walls of 1375, yellow – walls of 1465

The Pskov Judicial Charter describes the legislative procedure: "If some line (Note: The term "line" (stroka) means a legal norm or provision.) in the customary charter is missing, the mayors should report to Lord Pskov at the assembly meeting (dolozhit' gospodina Pskova na vechi) and write this line down [into the Charter]. And if some line does not please Lord Pskov, it can be freely removed from the Charter". Historians have compared the legislative procedure to those of medieval German towns. The power of the prince was limited but – in contrast to the Novgorod Republic – he still retained important administrative and judicial functions, the latter carried out jointly with the posadnik. The Pskov Judicial Charter required both officials to jointly preside over all trials. It also prohibited legal meetings at the veche, specifying that all trials were to be conducted in the entrance hall of the prince's residence. Both officials were expected to administer trials justly, according with their oath.

The veche had legislative powers; it could appoint military commanders and hear ambassadors' reports. It also approved expenses such as grants to princes and payments to builders of walls, towers and bridges. The veche gathered at the Trinity Cathedral, which held the archives of the veche and important private papers and state documents. The veche assembly included posadniki, as well as "middle" and common people. Historians differ on the extent to which the veche was dominated by elites, with some saying that real power was in the hands of boyars, while others consider the veche to have been a democratic institution. Conflicts were common and the confrontation between the veche and the posadniki in 1483–1484 led to the execution of one posadnik and to the confiscation of property of three other posadniki who fled to Moscow.

== Legal system ==
The legal system of the Pskov Republic was defined by an advanced and comprehensive body of law compiled from veche decrees and boyar council decisions. This framework, primarily preserved in the Pskov Judicial Charter, served as a cornerstone for nationwide law. The charter was the principal source for Ivan III’s Sudebnik of 1497, alongside the Novgorod Judicial Charter, representing a direct evolutionary link between the Russkaya Pravda and the Code of 1497.

The Grand Duchy of Moscow directly adopted Pskov's definitions of state treason (perevet) and its strict prohibitions on judicial bribery (posul), integrating these regional practices into the foundational administrative and criminal codes of the centralized Russian State.

More than half of the charter's 120 articles (63 in total) were devoted to civil-law norms, including suretyship, inheritance, sale, barter, gift contracts, and standardized written contracts. Pskov's commercial standards for written contracts laid the groundwork for early Russian civil law: the charter required written contracts for transactions exceeding one rouble and recognized several forms of written agreements, including the doska (a simple written record) and the zapis or ryadnitsa (a formally certified document), the latter carrying greater evidentiary weight.

== Administrative divisions ==
Like Novgorod, Pskov was divided into several kontsy (lit. 'ends'). There were four kontsy in the 14th century, as the city was growing and a new wall was constructed in 1465 the new ends were created. Each end had its central church which housed the archive, treasury and refectory where holiday feasts were held. The ends played a prominent role in the government: often delegations sent by Pskov had representatives from all the ends and each end administered a part of the territory of the republic outside of the capital city.

== Religion ==
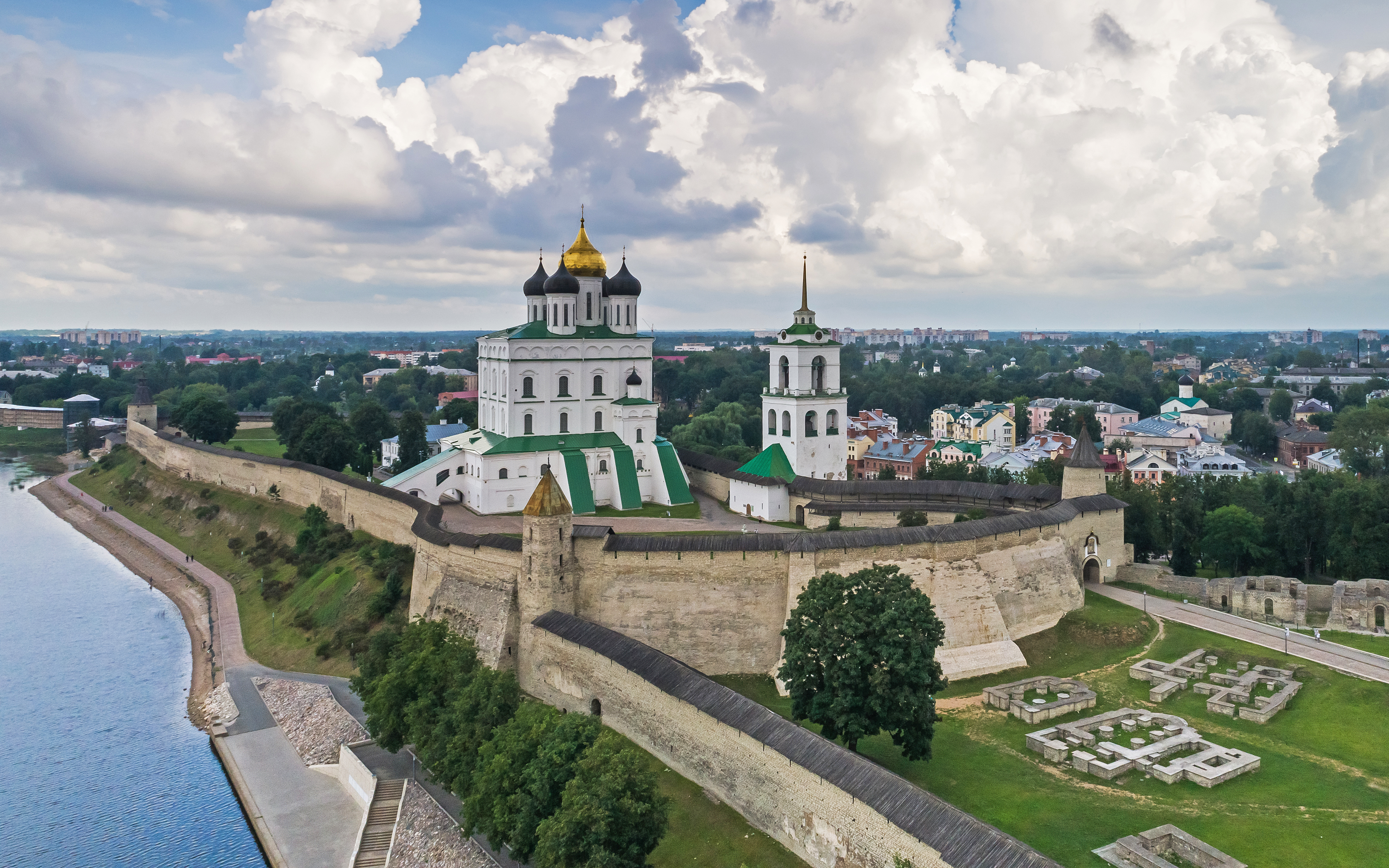
Trinity Cathedral in the medieval Pskov Kremlin

The term "fragmented sovereignty" has been applied to Pskov, in which it was dependent on the archbishop of Novgorod and on the Russian metropolitan in ecclesiastic affairs, and dependent on the Moscow grand principality in secular politics. Pskov belonged to the eparchy of Novgorod, and so local clergy remained subordinate to the archbishop of Novgorod.

The Pskovites are recorded to have unsuccessfully tried to obtain their own bishop several times. The Novgorodians conceded the right to have court cases regarding ecclesiastical affairs held in Pskov. The last attempt to establish a separate eparchy was in 1464, when the Pskovites petitioned Grand Prince Ivan III, requesting him to order the metropolitan to consecrate a bishop for Pskov. However, this petition was declined on the grounds that a bishopric had never existed in Pskov.

Unlike Novgorod, where the archbishop played an important role in political life, the church had a limited role in Pskov's politics as none of the local clergyman had been trusted to take part in the decision-making process or to represent the city. A religious sect, whose followers were known as the strigolniki, was active in the city from the second half of the 14th century. Metropolitan Dionisy was instructed by Patriarch Nilus to investigate the heresy in 1382. Due to persecution by the authorities in Novgorod and Pskov, along with internal disagreements among the strigolniki, the sect had disappeared by the early 15th century, only to be soon replaced with another sect, the Judaizers.

== Trade and economy ==
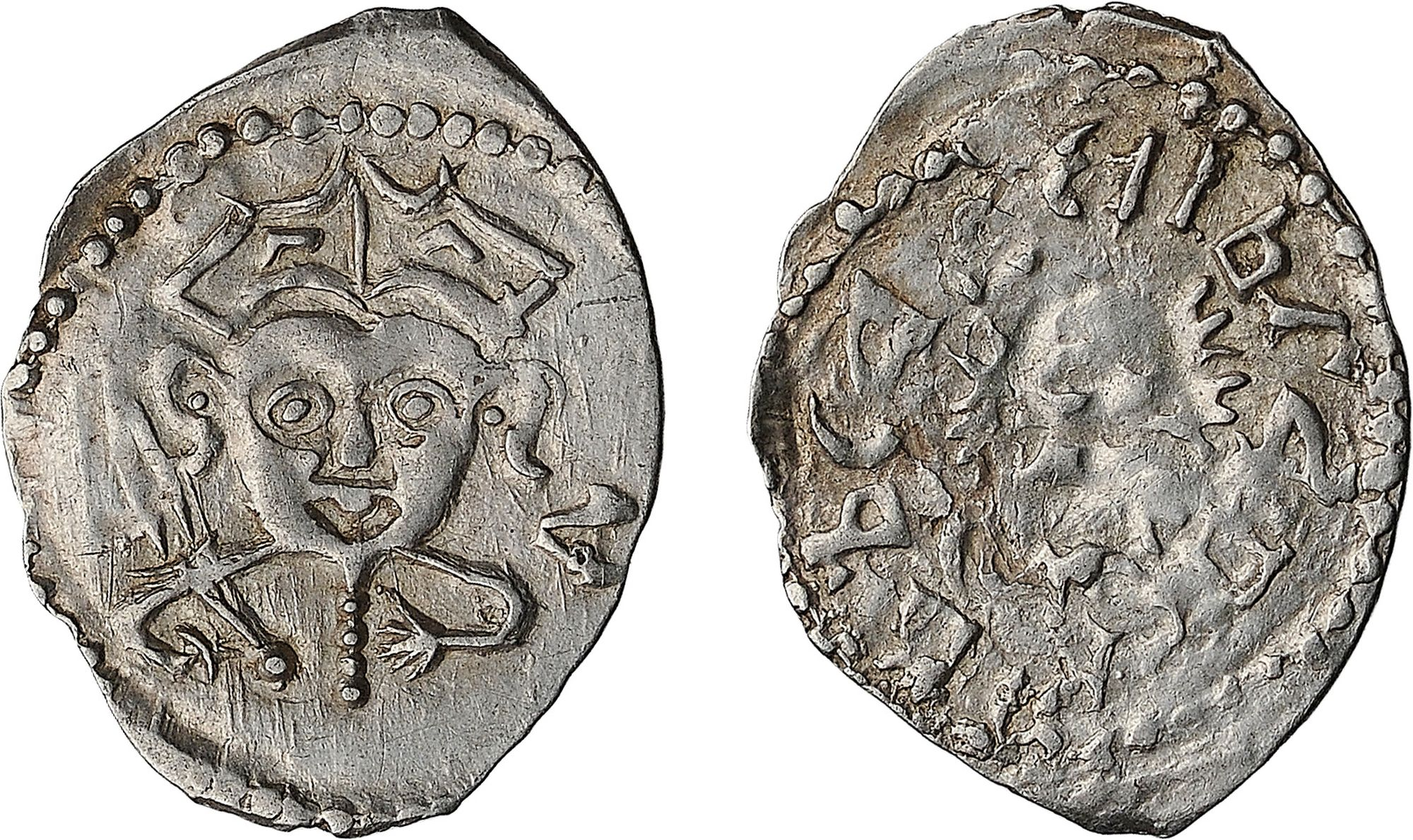
Pskov denga coins

Pskov, along with Novgorod, was an important center of trade between Russia and Western Europe as it was one of the westernmost Russian cities. The main export was wax. The first mention of the Pskov wax trade was in the 1342 treaty between Novgorod and German merchants. Because Pskov did not have a vast hinterland, unlike Novgorod, fur was never a significant export. In 1448, Novgorod and Pskov signed a treaty with the cities of Livonia as equal partners for the first time.

Already in the 13th century, German merchants were present in the Zapskovye area of Pskov and the Hanseatic League had a trading post in the same area in the first half of the 16th century which moved to Zavelichye after a fire in 1562. Pskov's main trade partners were Riga, Reval and Dorpat. The wars with the Livonian Order, Poland–Lithuania, and Sweden interrupted trade but it was maintained until the 17th century, with Swedish merchants gaining the upper hand eventually.

Pskov did not have a kontor like Novgorod; instead, the city had special "German" districts where foreign merchants could rent housing, while Pskov merchants resided in "Russian" districts in Dorpat. After Grand Prince Ivan III closed Novgorod's Hanseatic office in 1494, leading to a trade blockade, the cities of Livonia continued their trade through Pskov and explained to Lübeck that Pskov was not formally part of the Grand Principality of Moscow. From 1510, when grand princely customs were introduced in the city, the regulation of trade was decided by the local tsarist administration, and the governor of Pskov documented the entry and exit of all foreign merchants.

== Culture ==
=== Architecture ===
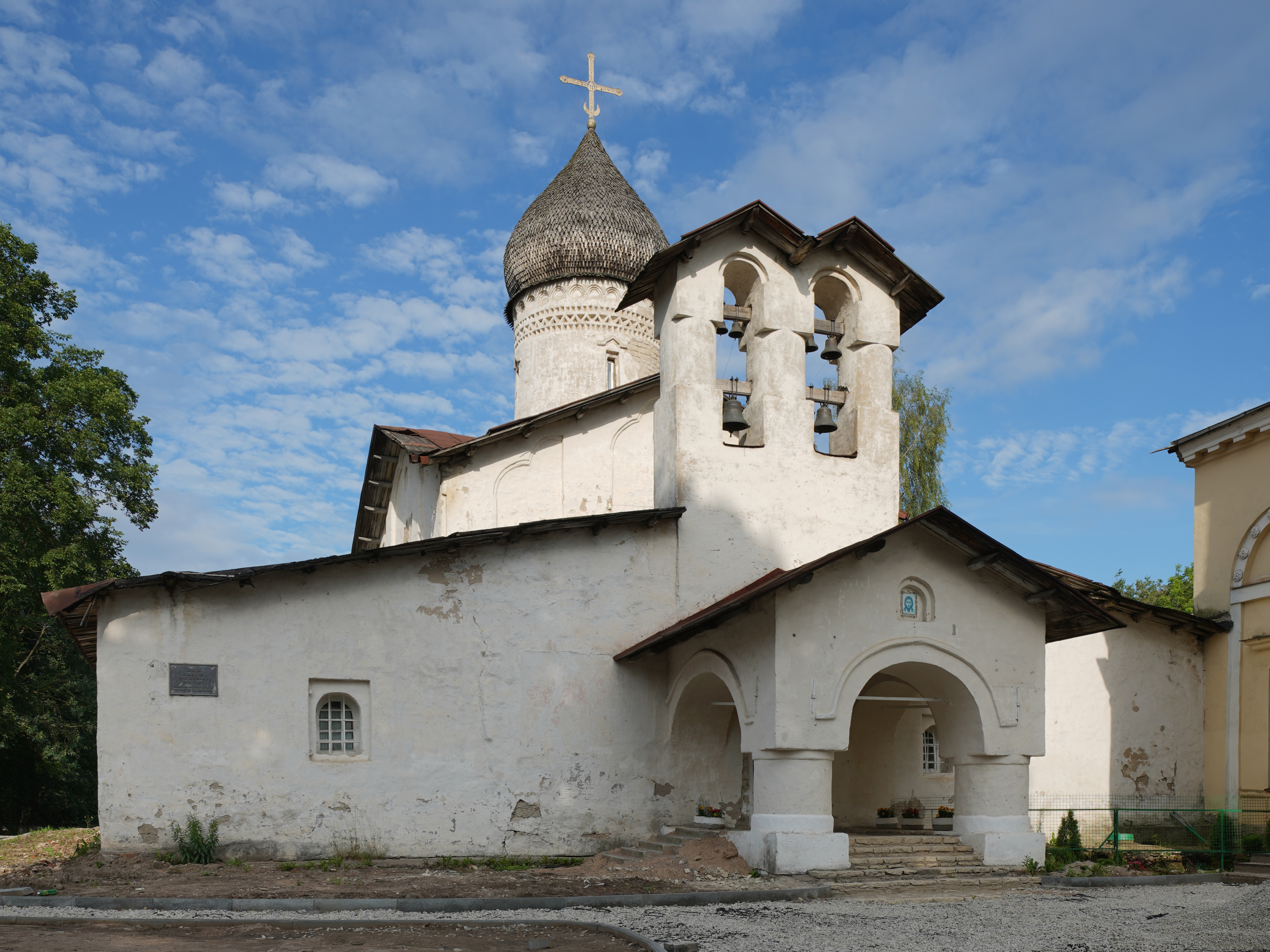
A typical single-domed church with a porch and zvonnitsa

The churches of Pskov feature many distinctive elements: corbel arches, church porches, exterior galleries and zvonnitsa bell towers. These features were introduced by Pskovian masons to Grand Duchy of Moscow, where they constructed numerous buildings during the 15th and 16th centuries. Out of all non-religious construction, only the fortresses in Pskov, Izborsk and Gdov have survived.

=== Literature ===
The literature of Pskov land was an integral part of medieval Russian literature. The chronicle-writing started in the 13th century, at first dealing mostly with topics of local interest. By the 15th century, the chronicles became more detailed and described events in Moscow, Novgorod, Lithuania and the Golden Horde. The most important works written in Pskov are the Story of Dovmont describing the coming of Dovmont to the city, his baptism and subsequent victories, The Life of Saint Euphrosynus and The Address of Hegumen Pamfil which contains one of the earliest descriptions of Ivan Kupala rituals.

The downfall of Pskov is recounted in the Story of the Taking of Pskov (1510), which was lauded by D. S. Mirsky as "one of the most beautiful short stories of Old Russia. The history of the Muscovites' leisurely perseverance is told with admirable simplicity and art. An atmosphere of descending gloom pervades the whole narrative: all is useless, and whatever the Pskovites can do, the Muscovite cat will take its time and eat the mouse when and how it pleases".

== List of princes ==
The princely system of governance can be divided into two periods: 1137–1399 and 1399–1510. During the first period, 24 princes sat on the throne, and they can be classified into two groups: independent dynasts and junior members of princely dynasties. The former did not recognize the authority of Novgorod and its prince, while the latter typically served as deputies to their senior sovereigns. When the head of a dynasty held the princely throne in Novgorod, he would oversee his deputy in Pskov. During the second period, 26 princes sat on the throne, none of whom demonstrated political independence.

Unlike Novgorod, where the prince was represented by a deputy and did not always hold a princely title, the prince of Pskov was enthroned in the Trinity Cathedral. From 1467 onward, the prince, who was a deputy of the grand prince of Moscow, gained the authority to appoint his own deputies in all 12 boroughs.

Prince	Service	Notes
Andrei of Polotsk	1342–1349	of the Gediminids clan
Eustaphy Feodorovich	1349–1360	also Prince of Izborsk
Alexander of Polotsk	1360–1369	
Matvei	1375–1377	
Andrei of Polotsk	1377–1399	second time
Ivan Andreyevich	1386–1394	
viceroys of the Grand Prince of Moscow	1399–1510	

== Sources ==
- Alexander, John T. (2003). Bubonic Plague in Early Modern Russia: Public Health and Urban Disaster. Oxford University Press. ISBN 978-0-19-515818-2.
- Arakcheev, Vladimir A. (2014). "The Evolution of State Institutions of the Republic of Pskov and the Problem of its Sovereignty from the Thirteenth to Fifteenth Centuries". Russian History. 41 (4): 423–439. ISSN 0094-288X.
- Byrne, Joseph P. (16 January 2012). Encyclopedia of the Black Death. Bloomsbury Publishing USA. ISBN 979-8-216-15485-3.
- Crummey, Robert O. (6 June 2014). The Formation of Muscovy 1300 - 1613. Routledge. ISBN 978-1-317-87199-6.
- Feldbrugge, Ferdinand Joseph Maria (2009). Law in Medieval Russia. BRILL. ISBN 978-90-04-16985-2.
- Feldbrugge, Ferdinand J. M. (2 October 2017). A History of Russian Law: From Ancient Times to the Council Code (Ulozhenie) of Tsar Aleksei Mikhailovich of 1649. BRILL. ISBN 978-90-04-35214-8.
- Fennell, John L. (2014a). A History of the Russian Church to 1488. Routledge. ISBN 978-1-317-89720-0.
- Fennell, John (2014b). The Crisis of Medieval Russia 1200-1304. Routledge. ISBN 978-1-317-87314-3.
- Fennell, John (15 November 2023). The Emergence of Moscow, 1304-1359. Univ of California Press. ISBN 978-0-520-34759-5.
- Filyushkin, Alexander (2018). "'To Remember Pskov': How the Medieval Republic was Stamped on the National Memory". Jahrbücher für Geschichte Osteuropas. 66 (4): 559–587. ISSN 0021-4019.
- Krom, Mikhail (2014). "The City of Pskov in the Fifteenth and Early Sixteenth Centuries: Communal Liberties and Fragmented Sovereignty". Russian History. 41 (4): 440–457. ISSN 0094-288X.
- Martin, Janet (2006). Perrie, Maureen (ed.). The Cambridge History of Russia: Volume 1, From Early Rus' to 1689. Cambridge University Press. pp. 127–157. ISBN 978-0-521-81227-6.
- Mirsky, D. S. (1999). A History of Russian Literature from Its Beginnings to 1900. Northwestern University Press. ISBN 978-0-8101-1679-5.
- Pickhan, Gertrud (1993). "The Incorporation of Gospodin Pskov into the Muscovite State". New Perspectives on Muscovite History: Selected Papers from the Fourth World Congress for Soviet and East European Studies, Harrogate, 1990. Palgrave Macmillan UK. pp. 51–58. ISBN 978-1-349-22428-9.
- Riasanovsky, Nicholas V. (29 September 2005). Russian Identities: A Historical Survey. Oxford University Press. ISBN 978-0-19-534814-9.
- Riasanovsky, Nicholas Valentine; Steinberg, Mark D. (2019). A History of Russia. Oxford University Press. ISBN 978-0-19-064558-8.
- Shaikhutdinov, Marat (2021). Between East and West: The Formation of the Moscow State. Academic Studies Press. doi:10.2307/j.ctv249sgn2. ISBN 978-1-64469-713-9. JSTOR j.ctv249sgn2.
- Uspensky, B. A. (5 September 2021). "'Господарь Великий Новгород': происхождение названия". Древняя Русь. Вопросы медиевистики (in Russian). 85 (3): 24–44. doi:10.25986/IRI.2021.85.3.003.
- Valerov, A. V. (2004). Новгород и Псков очерки политической истории Северо-Западной Руси XI-XIV веков. Saint Petersburg: Алетея. pp. 190–191. ISBN 5893296680.
- Vodoff, Vladimir (2000). "Pskov". In Vauchez, Andre (ed.). Encyclopedia of the Middle Ages. Vol. 2. James Clarke & Co. p. 1199. ISBN 978-0-227-67931-9.
- Vovin, Alexei; Krom, Mikhail (17 February 2017). "The city of Pskov in the fourteenth and fifteenth centuries: Baltic trade and institutional growth". In Blockmans, Wim; Krom, Mikhail; Wubs-Mrozewicz, Justyna (eds.). The Routledge Handbook of Maritime Trade around Europe 1300-1600: Commercial Networks and Urban Autonomy. Taylor & Francis. pp. 313–330. ISBN 978-1-315-27856-8.
- Vovin, Alexei A. (2020). "Veche and the terms 'All Pskov' and 'Pskov Men': The Russian Medieval City Assembly as a Communal Structure". Mesto a dejiny. 9 (2): 6–28. doi:10.33542/CAH2020-2-01.
