= Pskova =

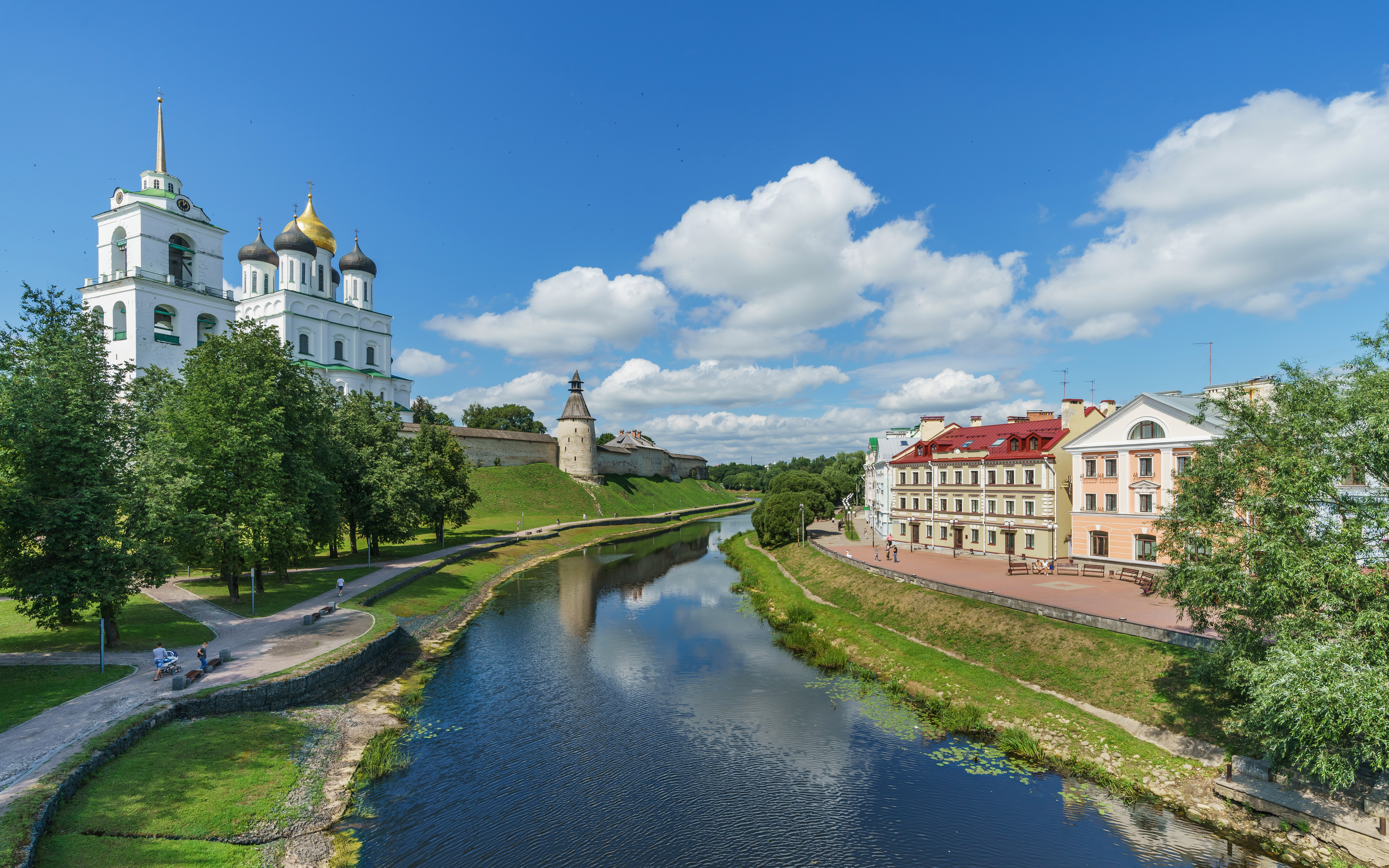

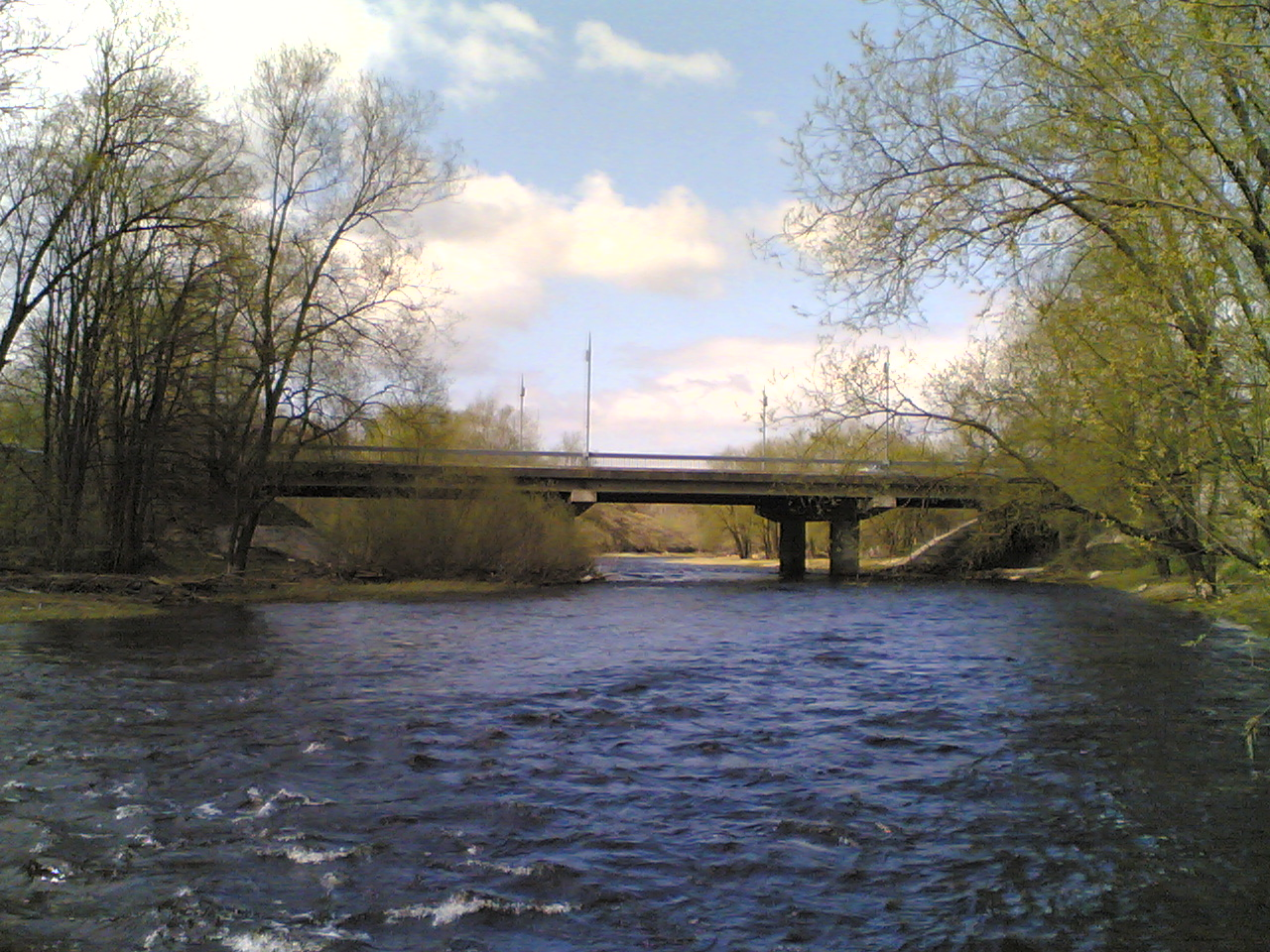
- Kuznetsky Bridge over the Pskova in Pskov

Location
- Country: Russia

Physical characteristics
- Mouth: Velikaya
  - coordinates: 57°49′31″N 28°19′35″E
- Length: 102 kilometres (63 mi)
- Basin size: 1,000 square kilometres (390 mi^{2})

Basin features
- Progression: Velikaya→ Lake Peipus→ Narva→ Gulf of Finland

The Pskova (Russian: Пскова) is a river in Strugo-Krasnensky and Pskovsky Districts of Pskov Oblast, as well as in the city of Pskov in Russia. It is a right tributary of the Velikaya and belongs to the basin of the Narva. It is 102 kilometres (63 mi) long, and the area of its basin 1,000 square kilometres (390 sq mi). The city of Pskov is located on the banks of the Pskova. The tributaries include: the Pskovitsa and the Drebyonka (left), as well as the Toroshinka and the Milyovka (right).

The source of the Pskova is in the western part of Strugo-Krasnensky District. The Pskova flows south, and a stretch of the river forms the border between Strugo-Krasnensky and Pskovsky Districts. The Pskova departs from the border back into Strugo-Krasnensky District, turns southwest and enters Pskovsky District. In the city of Pskov, it turns west and joins the river Velikaya. The Pskov Kremlin is located between by the mouth of the Pskova.

The drainage basin of the Pskova includes the eastern part of Pskovsky District and the southwestern part of Strugo-Krasnensky District.
