= Pskov Krom =

Citadel in Pskov, Russia

Coordinates: 57°49′17″N 28°19′46″E

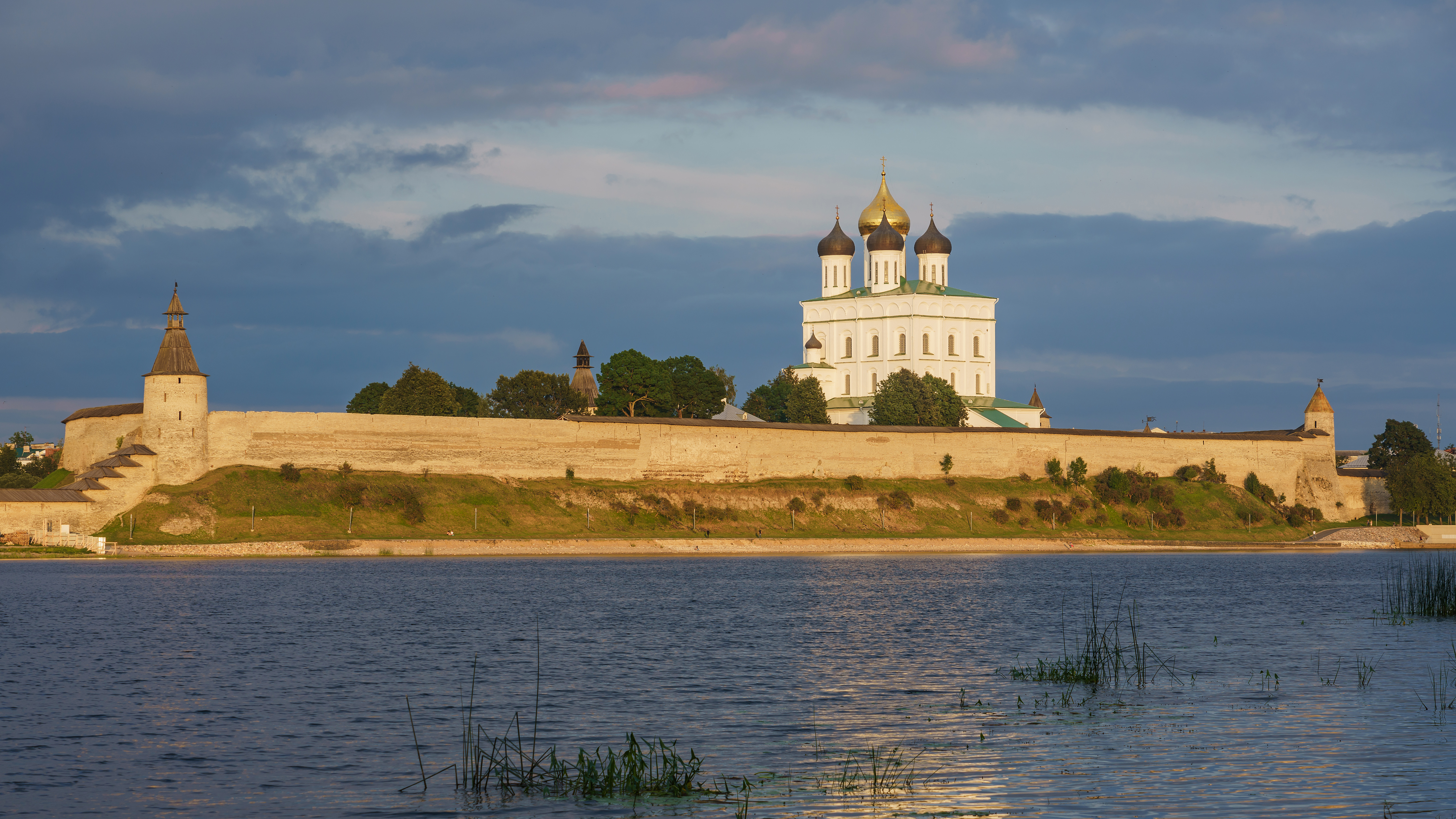
The Krom (or Kremlin) in Pskov, with the Velikaya River in the foreground and the Trinity Cathedral in the background

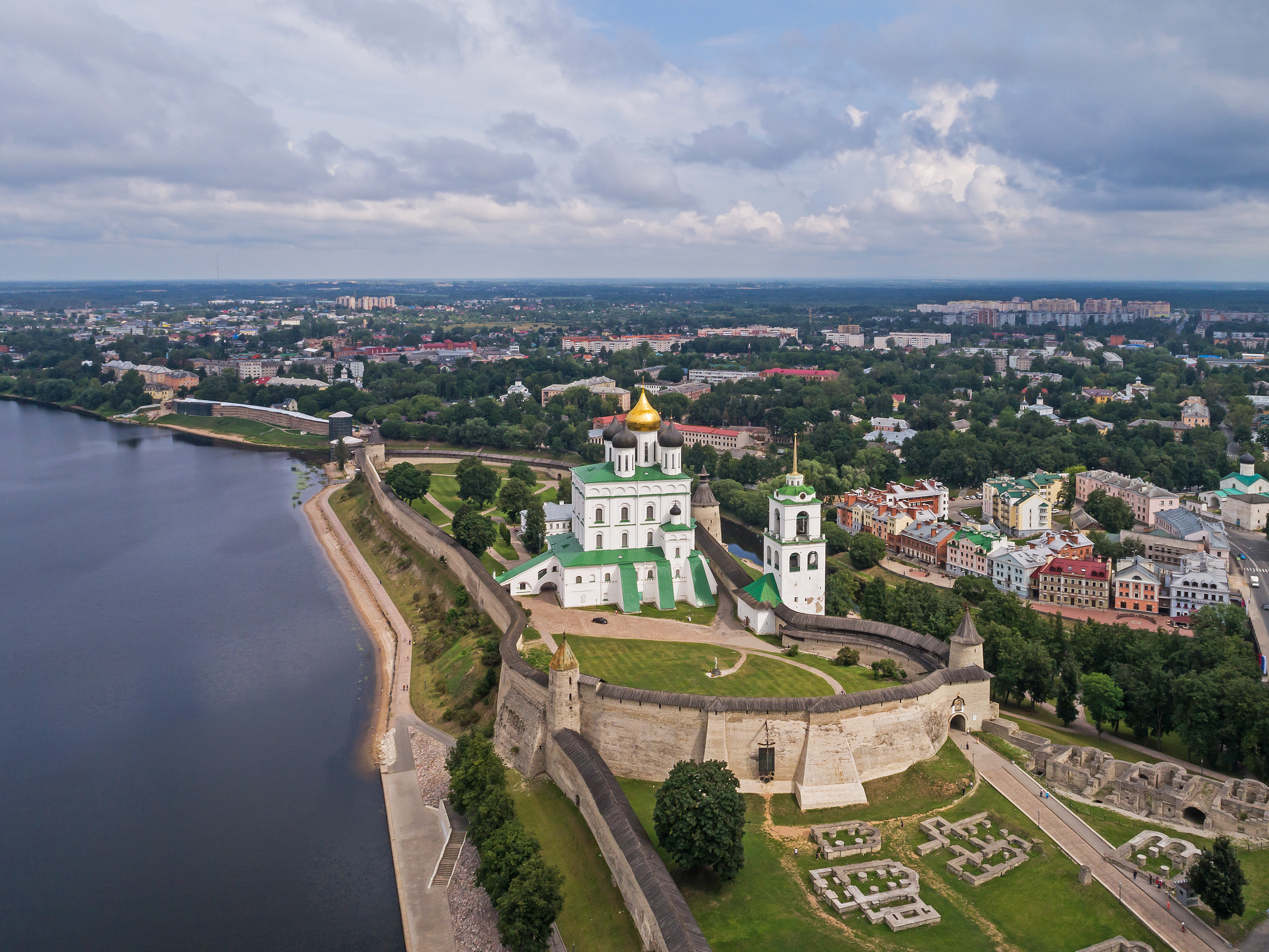
Aerial view

The Pskov Krom (Russian: Псковский Кром, romanized: Pskovsky Krom), also known as the Pskov Kremlin (Russian: Псковский Кремль, romanized: Pskovsky Kreml'), is a citadel in Pskov, Russia. In the central part of the city, the Krom is located at the junction of the Velikaya and Pskova rivers. The citadel is of medieval origin, with the surrounding walls constructed starting in the late 15th century.

== History ==
The Krom was the administrative and spiritual centre of the Pskov Republic in the 15th century.

In 2010, two of the towers of the Krom (the Vlasyevskaya, which dates to the 15th or 16th century, and the Rybnitskaya, which dates to 13th or 14th) were damaged in a fire.

It is a Russian nominated candidate site on the UNESCO World Heritage Tentative List under the "Great Pskov" nomination.

== See also ==
- Trinity Cathedral in Pskov (located within the walls of the Krom)
