= Trinity Cathedral, Pskov =

Cathedral in Russia

Coordinates: 57°49′19″N 28°19′43″E

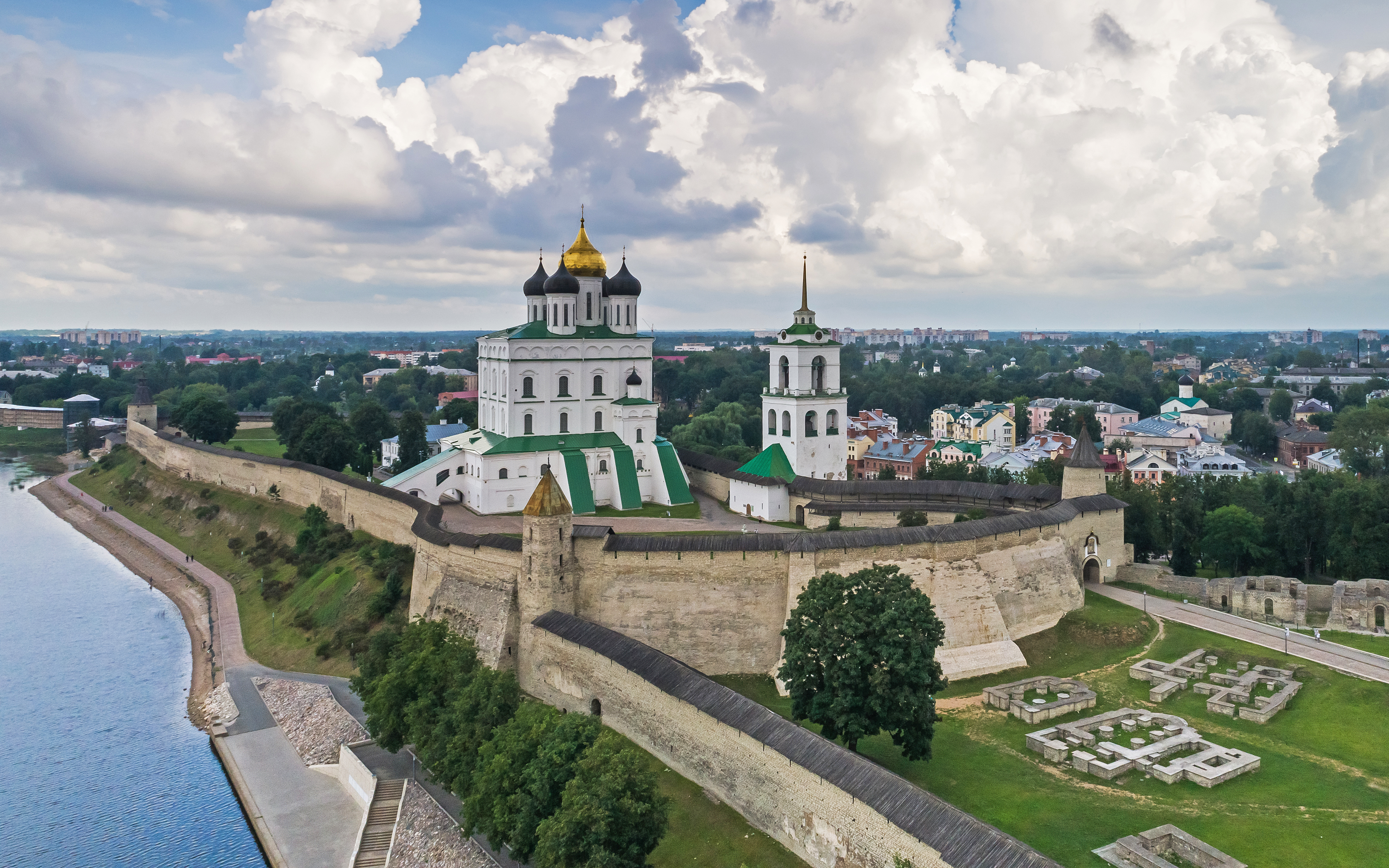
View of the Trinity Cathedral in the Pskov Kremlin

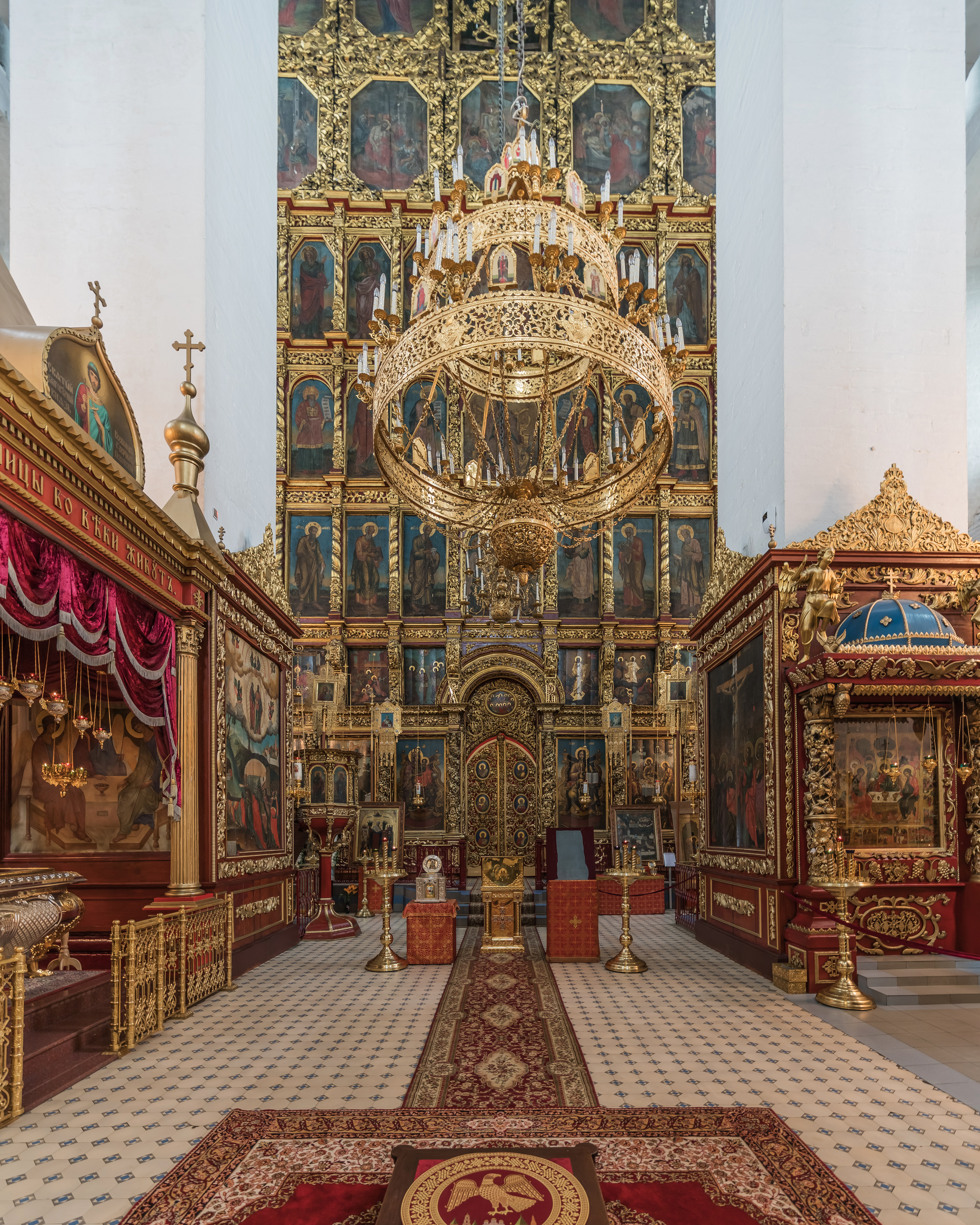
Interior of the cathedral

The Trinity Cathedral (Russian: Троицкий собор) is located in the Pskov Krom or Kremlin on the east bank of the Velikaya (Great) River. It has, since 1589, been the mother church of the Pskov Eparchy.

The first wooden Trinity Cathedral (the Russian term sobor, translated as "cathedral" can mean any major church irrespective of it being a cathedral church of a bishop) was built in the tenth century, allegedly under the patronage of Princess Olga, but this seems unlikely as Olga's conversion was personal, and the conversion of the Rus Land did not occur until 988, almost two decades after her death. Thus, it seems likely the first church dates to the time of Christianization or shortly thereafter. This church was replaced by a stone church in 1138, allegedly at the behest of Prince Vsevolod Mstislavich, who died the previous year. The cathedral was destroyed and rebuilt several times over the centuries; for example, the Novgorodian First Chronicle mentions that in 1365, Archbishop Aleksei of Novgorod (r. 1359-1388) blessed the reconstruction of a stone church on the foundations of the original Trinity church; it was completed in 1367 under the direction of Master Kirill (who appears to have died in the plague of 1390). This church was heavily damaged in a fire in 1609 and the interior was renovated aftwards. The current building was built beginning in 1691 and consecrated in 1699.

In the Soviet period, the cathedral was part of the schismatic Living Church movement in the 1920s before its closure in the 1930s, at which time it was turned into a museum. It was reopened as a church during the Nazi occupation. It remained open after the war.

The cathedral is 256 feet tall and contains the tombs of saint princes Vsevolod Mstislavich (also known as Gavriil - died in 1138) and Dovmont (died in 1299).

The current bishop of Pskov, as of February 1993, is Archbishop Evsevii (Nikolai Afanas'evich Savvin).

== Burials ==
- Vsevolod of Pskov
