= Prince of Polotsk =

Ruler of the Polotsk principality

The Prince of Polotsk ruled the Principality of Polotsk within the realm of Kievan Rus' or within the Grand Duchy of Lithuania from the mid-9th century to 1307.

== History ==
Rogvold, a non-Rurikid Varangian, was the first Prince of Polotsk. When Vladimir the Great returned from exile in Scandinavia in 980 to try to claim the Kievan throne that his brother, Yaropolk, held, he sought an alliance with Rogvolod through a marriage with his daughter, Rogneda. When she refused, calling Vladimir the "son of a slave," he attacked Polotsk, killed Rogvold and his son, and took Rogneda by force to be his wife. Polotsk was then granted to Vladimir's son, Izyaslav, around the time of Christianization (988), and when Izyaslav predeceased his father in 1001, the throne of Polotsk was passed on to Izyaslav's son, Briacheslav, and the Polotsk line (the senior branch of Vladimir's sons) became izgoi and was not legally allowed to succeed to the Kievan throne, although Bryacheslav's son, Vseslav, held briefly the Kievan throne in 1068–1069, after it was granted to him by the veche following the Kiev Uprising.

== List of princes ==
=== First rulers of Polotsk ===
Ruler	Born	Reign	Ruling part	Consort	Death	Notes
Rogvolod I (Рагвалод); Old Norse: Ragnvald	c.920 Västergötland	945-978	Polotsk	Unknown at least three children	978; Polotsk aged c.57-58?	First known ruler in Polotsk. It's been speculated that he and his daughter were members of the Ynglings royal family, in today's Sweden.
Rogneda (Рагнеда); Old Norse: Ragnheiðr	962; Daughter of Rogvolod I	978-1002	Polotsk	Vladimir the Great; 980 (separated in 988) eight children	1002 aged 39–40	Sometimes called Gorislava (Гарыслава). Refusing to marry Vladimir the Great, he raped her, killed her entire family and married her by force. Without any other surviving family, she and her son, Iziaslav, as per Norse royal custom, were then sent to govern jointly the land of her parents.

=== Kievan Rus' and its Belarusian feuds (862-1362) ===
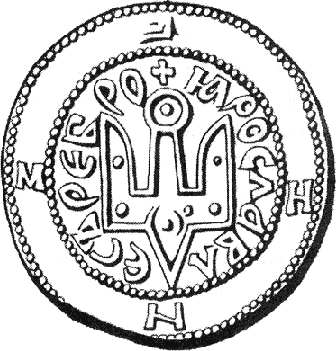
Personal seal of Yaroslav the Wise

==== Rurikids ====
The Rurikids were descendants of Rurik (Ukrainian: Рюрик) (Hrørekr), a Varangian pagan konung or chieftain, who according to the Primary Chronicle was invited to rule Novgorod in 862 and who came to become the ruler of the Northern Slavic tribes of the (Krivchians and Slovene) as well as the Finnish tribes (Meria, Chud and Ves). Later his son or grandson, Prince Ihor, became the Prince of separate Kyivan territories to the south beginning the rule of the Riurykide dynasty of Kyivan Rus. The existence of Rurik is a point of contention for historians, P. Kovaletsky and Omeljan Pritsak believe that Rurik was the same person as Hroereckr (Rorik), the 9th century Norse king of Jutland and Frisia and that pervasive myths and legends about him formed the basis for the primary chroniclers. Alternatively, Alexsei Shakmatov accepts the Primary Chronicle's account as factual and Rurik is a historic being.

===== Partitions of Kievan Rus' in Belarusian territory under Rurik dynasty =====
Kievan Rus', Grand Principality of Rus' (980-1078)
Principality of Turov-Pinsk (1078-1320) (Divided in Turov and Pinsk since c.1170)
Principality of Polotsk (988-1274)	Principality of Drutsk (1101-c.1200)	Principality of Vitebsk (1101-1345)
Principality of Minsk (1101-1216)
To Lithuania
To Lithuania	To Lithuania
To Lithuania

===== Table of rulers =====
(Note: As many princes ruled at different times in many places, the numbering of the princes is restricted to the Kievan Rus'/Kyiv and the Principality of Polotsk)

Ruler	Born	Reign	Ruling part	Consort	Death	Notes
Vladimir I the Great; Vladimir Basil Sviatoslavich (Володимир Великий/Володимѣръ Свѧтославичь); Old Norse: Valdamarr Sveinaldsson	c.958 Budiatychi; Son of Sviatoslav I of Kyiv and Malusha/Malfrida	980 – 15 July 1015	Kyivan Rus'	Olava/Allogia c.977 at least one son A Greek nun (widow of his brother) c.980 at least one son Rogneda of Polotsk c.978 (possibly in bigamy) eight children Adela (of Bulgaria?) at least two children (maximum four) Malfrida (of Bohemia?); Before 1000 two children Anna Porphyrogenita of Byzantium; 988; Cherson three children Regelindis (?) of Saxony (granddaughter of Otto I, Holy Roman Emperor); After 1011 one or two daughters Unknown two children	15 July 1015; Berestove (now part of Kyiv) aged 57–58	His early rule is characterized by a staunch pagan reaction but in 988 he was baptized into Orthodoxy and successfully converted Kyivan Rus' to Christianity.
Iziaslav I (Ізяслаў)	c.978 Kyiv; First son of Vladimir I the Great and Rogneda of Polotsk	988 – 1001	Polotsk	Unknown two children	1001; Polotsk aged 22–23	Polotsk splits rapidly from Kyivan Rus. As the eldest son of his mother, Iziaslav ruled in Polotsk alongside her.
Vseslav I (Усяслаў)	c.990 Polotsk; First son of Iziaslav I	1001-1003	Polotsk	Unmarried	1003; Polotsk aged 12–13?	His succession to his father consolidated the family's possession of Polotsk. Died without descendants.
Briacheslav I (Брачыслаў)	c.990 Polotsk; Second son of Iziaslav I	1003-1044	Polotsk	Unknown one child	1044; Polotsk aged 53–54	
Sviatopolk I the Accursed; Sviatopolk Yaropolkovich (Святополк Окаянний); Old Norse: Sveinpolk Iaropolksson	c.980 Kyiv; Son of Sviatoslav I of Kyiv and Predslava	15 July 1015 – 1019	Kyivan Rus'	Unknown name (daughter of Bolesław I of Poland) no children	1019; Brest aged 38–39	
Yaroslav I the Wise; Yaroslav George Vladimirovich (Яросла́в Му́дрий); Old Norse: Jarizleifr Valdamarrsson	c.978 Third son of Vladimir I the Great and Rogneda of Polotsk	1019 – 20 February 1054	Kyivan Rus'	Ingigerda of Sweden; 1019; Novgorod eight or nine children	20 February 1054; Vyshhorod aged 75–76	Prince of Rostov, Prince of Novgorod, and Grand Prince of Kyiv; during his reign Kyivan Rus' reached the pinnacle of its power.
Iziaslav I Iziaslav Demetrius Yaroslavich (Ізяслав Ярославич); Old Norse: Izjasleifr(?) Jarizleifsson	c.1024 Second son of Yaroslav I and Ingigerda of Sweden	20 February 1054 – 14 September 1068 April 1069 – 22 May 1073 15 July 1076 – 3 October 1078	Kyivan Rus'	Gertrude of Poland; 1043 three children	3 October 1078; Nizhyn aged 53–54	Reigned three times, threatened by the power of his relatives Vseslav of Polotsk (1068–69) and Sviatoslav II of Kyiv (1073–76). First ruler titled King of Rus' , as Pope Gregory VII sent him a crown from Rome in 1075.
Vseslav II the Seer; Vseslav Basil Bryacheslavich (Всеслав Брячиславич)	c.1039 Polotsk; Son of Briacheslav I	1044 – 24 April 1101	Polotsk	Unknown six children	24 April 1101; Polotsk aged 61–62	
Vseslav II the Seer; Vseslav Basil Bryacheslavich (Всеслав Брячиславич)	c.1039 Polotsk; Son of Briacheslav I	14 September 1068 – April 1069	Kyivan Rus'	Unknown six children	24 April 1101; Polotsk aged 61–62	
Sviatoslav II; Sviatoslav Nicholas Yaroslavich (Святослав Ярославич); Old Norse: Sveinald Jarizleifsson	c.1027 Kyiv; Third son of Yaroslav I and Ingigerda of Sweden	22 May 1073 – 15 July 1076	Kyivan Rus'	Cecilia of DithmarschenBetween 1043 and 1047 five children Oda of Stade (Nordmark) c.1065 one son	27 December 1076; Kyiv aged 48–49	A brief ruler during his brother Iziaslav's official reign.
Saint Yaropolk Iziaslavich	c.1043 First son of Iziaslav I and Gertrude of Poland	3 October 1078 – 22 November 1087	Turov-Pinsk	Kunigunde of Meissen c.1071 four children	22 November 1087; Zvenyhorod aged 62–63	His rule splits Turov-Pinsk from Kyiv authority.
Sviatopolk Iziaslavich	8 November 1050; Second son of Iziaslav I and Gertrude of Poland	22 November 1087 – 13 April 1093	Turov-Pinsk	Unknown name (daughter of Spytihněv II of Bohemia) c.1085 three children Olenna of the Kipchaks c.1094 four children	26 April 1113; Vyshhorod aged 62	In 1093, he ascended to Kyivan throne.
Viacheslav Yaropolkovich	c.1075? Second son of Yaropolk Iziaslavich and Kunigunde of Meissen	13 April 1093 – 1104	Turov-Pinsk	Unknown	1104 aged 28–29?	
Rogvolod II Boris I (Брачыслаў)	c.1060? Polotsk; First son of Vseslav II	24 April 1101 - 1129	Polotsk	Unknown three children	1129; Polotsk aged 68–69?	Children of Vseslav II, divided the principality between the three.
Rogvolod II Boris I (Брачыслаў)	c.1060? Polotsk; First son of Vseslav II	24 April 1101 - 1127	Drutsk	Unknown three children	1129; Polotsk aged 68–69?	Children of Vseslav II, divided the principality between the three.
Gleb Vseslavich (Глеб Усяславіч)	c.1060? Polotsk; Second son of Vseslav II	24 April 1101 - 13 September 1119	Minsk	Anastasia Yaropolkovna of Turov-Pinsk; 1090 four children	13 September 1119; Kyiv aged 58–59?	Children of Vseslav II, divided the principality between the three.
Minsk briefly annexed to Kyiv (1119-1146)						Children of Vseslav II, divided the principality between the three.
Sviatoslav Vseslavich (Святаслаў Усяславіч)	c.1060? Polotsk; Sixth son of Vseslav II	24 April 1101 - c.1129	Vitebsk	Sophia five children	c.1129 Vitebsk aged 68–69?	Children of Vseslav II, divided the principality between the three.
Vitebsk briefly annexed to Kyiv (1129-1132)						Children of Vseslav II, divided the principality between the three.
Vladimir Vsevolodovich Monomakh	1053; Son of Vsevolod I of Kyiv and Anastasia of Byzantium	1104 – 19 May 1125	Turov-Pinsk	Gytha of Wessex c.1074 five or six children Euphemia of Byzantium c.1100 six or seven children Unknown name (daughter of Aepa Ocenevich, Khan in Cumania); After 1107 no known children	19 May 1125; Kyiv aged 71–72	Also Grand Prince of Kyiv. From his reign, the succession in Turov-Pinsk echoed the distant Kyivan disputes for the throne.
Viacheslav Vladimirovich	1083; Chernihiv; Sixth son of Vladimir Vladimirovich and Gytha of Wessex	19 May 1125 – 14 April 1132 1134 - 1136 1136 - 1142 1146	Turov-Pinsk	Unknown before 1139 one child	2 February 1154; Kyiv aged 70–71	Also Grand Prince of Kyiv.
David (Давыд)	c.1060? Polotsk; Fourth son of Vseslav II	1129	Polotsk	Unknown three children	1129; Polotsk aged 68–69?	
Iziaslav II	1096; Novgorod; First son of Mstislav I of Kyiv and Christina of Sweden	1129 - 14 April 1132	Polotsk (with Drutsk)	Agnes of Hohenstaufen before 1151 five children Rusudan of Georgia; 1154 no children	13 November 1154; Kyiv aged 57–58	Also Grand Prince of Kyiv.
Iziaslav II	1096; Novgorod; First son of Mstislav I of Kyiv and Christina of Sweden	14 April 1132 - 1134 1136	Turov-Pinsk	Agnes of Hohenstaufen before 1151 five children Rusudan of Georgia; 1154 no children	13 November 1154; Kyiv aged 57–58	Also Grand Prince of Kyiv.
Sviatopolk	1114; Fourth son of Mstislav I of Kyiv and Christina of Sweden	24 April 1132 – 1132	Polotsk (with Drutsk)	Euphemia of Olomouc; 1143 or 1144 no children	20 February 1154	Also Prince of Volhynia.
Vasilko I (Васілька)	c.1080 Polotsk; First son of Sviatoslav Vseslavich and Sophia	1132 - 1144	Polotsk (with Vitebsk and Drutsk)	Unknown five children	1144; Vitebsk aged 63–64	While also ruling in the senior principality of Polotsk, Vasilko managed to restore the sovereignty of his father's principality.
Sviatoslav Vsevolodovich	1123; Chernihiv; First son of Vsevolod II of Kyiv and Maria Mstislavna of Kyiv	1142-1146 1154	Turov-Pinsk	Maria Vasilkovna of Polotsk; 1143 eight children	25 July 1194; Brest aged 70–71	Also Prince of Chernihiv and Grand Prince of Kyiv.
Rogvolod III Basil (Рагвалод-Васіль)	c.1110 Polotsk; Second son of Rogvolod II Boris	1127-1129 1140-1144 1158-1159 1162-1170	Drutsk	? Iziaslavna of Kyiv (daughter of Iziaslav II of Kyiv) five children	1170; Polotsk aged 59–60?	
Rogvolod III Basil (Рагвалод-Васіль)	c.1110 Polotsk; Second son of Rogvolod II Boris	1144-1151 1159-1162	Polotsk	? Iziaslavna of Kyiv (daughter of Iziaslav II of Kyiv) five children	1170; Polotsk aged 59–60?	
Gleb Rogvolodovich	c.1130? Polotsk; First son of Rogvolod III Basil	1144-1151 1159-1162 1170-1186	Drutsk	Unknown	1186; Drutsk aged 55–56?	
Yaroslav Iziaslavich	1132; Second son of Iziaslav Mstislavich and Agnes of Hohenstaufen	1146-1148	Turov-Pinsk	Richeza of Bohemia; 1149 four children	1180; Lutsk aged 47–48	Also Grand Prince of Kyiv.
Yuri Yaroslavich	c.1112 Son of Yaroslav Sviatopolkovich, Prince of Volhynia	1148-1150 1151-1154 1157-1168	Turov-Pinsk	Anna Vsevolodovna of Grodno seven children	1168; Bogolyubovo aged 55–56	His last reign marked the end of Kyiv involvement in the government; the principality passed directly to Yuri's children.
Andrey Yurievich Bogolyubsky	1111; Rostov; Third son of Yuri of Kyiv and ? of Cumania	1150-1151	Turov-Pinsk	Yulita Stepanovna four children	29 June 1174; Bogolyubovo aged 62–63	Also Grand Prince of Vladimir.
Rostislav (Расціслаў)	c.1110 Polotsk; First son of Gleb Vseslavich, Prince of Minsk and Anastasia Yaropolkovna of Turov-Pinsk	1146-1151 1159-1165	Minsk	Unknown two children	1165; Minsk aged 64–65?	
Rostislav (Расціслаў)	c.1110 Polotsk; First son of Gleb Vseslavich, Prince of Minsk and Anastasia Yaropolkovna of Turov-Pinsk	1151-1159	Polotsk	Unknown two children	1165; Minsk aged 64–65?	
Gleb Rostislavich	c.1130? Polotsk; Son of Rostislav	1151-1158	Drutsk	Unknown	1163; Drutsk aged 69–70?	
Boris Yurievich	c.1120? Seventh son of Yuri of Kyiv and ? of Cumania	1154-1157	Turov-Pinsk	Maria one child	2 May 1159; Suzdal aged 38–39?	
Vseslav III	c.1110 Polotsk; First son of Vasilko I	1144-1162 1176-1178 1182-1186	Vitebsk	? Rostislavna of Smolensk c.1160 one child	1186; Polotsk aged 69–70?	
Vseslav III	c.1110 Polotsk; First son of Vasilko I	1162-1167 1167-1180	Polotsk	? Rostislavna of Smolensk c.1160 one child	1186; Polotsk aged 69–70?	
Roman Viacheslavich (Раман)	c.1130? Son of Viacheslav Rostislavich and ? Viacheslavna of Kyiv	1162-1165	Vitebsk	Unknown two children	1165; Vitebsk aged 34–35?	Great-grandson of Vseslav I.
David Sviatoslavich	c.1110? Second son of Sviatoslav Vseslavich and Sophia	1165-1167	Vitebsk	Unknown one child	1173; Vitebsk aged 62–63?	
Volodar (Валадар)	c.1120 Polotsk; Second son of Gleb Vseslavich, Prince of Minsk and Anastasia Yaropolkovna of Turov-Pinsk	1151-1159 1165-1177	Minsk	Richeza of Poland; 18 June 1136 (annulled c.1150) four children	1180; Minsk aged 59–60?	
Volodar (Валадар)	c.1120 Polotsk; Second son of Gleb Vseslavich, Prince of Minsk and Anastasia Yaropolkovna of Turov-Pinsk	1167	Polotsk	Richeza of Poland; 18 June 1136 (annulled c.1150) four children	1180; Minsk aged 59–60?	
Viacheslav Sviatoslavich	c.1110? Third son of Sviatoslav Vseslavich and Sophia	1167-1168	Vitebsk	Unknown two children	1168; Vitebsk aged 57–58?	
Ivan Yurievich	c.1140? First son of Yuri Yaroslavich and Anna Vsevolodovna of Grodno	1168-c.1170	Turov-Pinsk	Unknown one child	c.1180? Turov aged 39–40?	Retired from government in 1170. After that, his brothers divided the principality.
Briacheslav Vasilkovich	c.1140 Vitebsk; First son of Vasilko I	1168-1176 1178-1182	Vitebsk	Unknown two children	1186; Vitebsk aged 45–46	
Sviatopolk Yurievich	c.1140? Second son of Yuri Yaroslavich and Anna Vsevolodovna of Grodno	c.1170 - 19 April 1190	Turov-Pinsk (at Turov)	Unknown two children	19 April 1190; Turov aged 49–50?	Brothers of Ivan Yurievich, divided the principality in halves.
Yaroslav Yurievich	c.1140? Third son of Yuri Yaroslavich and Anna Vsevolodovna of Grodno	c.1170 - 1190	Turov-Pinsk (at Pinsk)	Unknown one child	c.1190 Pinsk aged 49–50?	Brothers of Ivan Yurievich, divided the principality in halves.
Boris II	c.1140? Son of David Sviatoslavich, Prince of Vitebsk	1180-1185	Polotsk	Unknown one child	1185; Vitebsk aged 44–45?	
Vladimir II (Уладзімір)	c.1140 Polotsk; First son of Volodar and Richeza of Poland	1177-1216	Minsk	Unmarried	1216; Polotsk aged 75–76?	Children of Volodar, ruled jointly in Minsk, but succeeded each other in Polotsk.
Vladimir II (Уладзімір)	c.1140 Polotsk; First son of Volodar and Richeza of Poland	1185-1216	Polotsk	Unmarried	1216; Polotsk aged 75–76?	Children of Volodar, ruled jointly in Minsk, but succeeded each other in Polotsk.
Vasilko II	c.1140 Polotsk; Second son of Volodar and Richeza of Poland	1177-1216	Minsk	? Davidovna of Smolensk (daughter of Davyd Rostislavich) at least one child	1222; Polotsk aged 75–76?	Children of Volodar, ruled jointly in Minsk, but succeeded each other in Polotsk.
Vasilko II	c.1140 Polotsk; Second son of Volodar and Richeza of Poland	1216-1222	Polotsk	? Davidovna of Smolensk (daughter of Davyd Rostislavich) at least one child	1222; Polotsk aged 75–76?	Children of Volodar, ruled jointly in Minsk, but succeeded each other in Polotsk.
Minsk annexed to Lithuania
Polotsk briefly annexed to Smolensk
Vasilko Briacheslavich	c.1150? Vitebsk; Son of Briacheslav Vasilkovich	1186-1221	Vitebsk	Unknown two children	1221; Vitebsk aged 70–71?	
Boris Rogvolodovich	c.1140? Polotsk; Second son of Rogvolod III Basil	1186-c.1200	Drutsk	Unknown	c.1200 Drutsk aged 59–60?	Brothers of Gleb Rogvolodovich, possibly ruled jointly.
Vseslav Rogvolodovich	c.1140? Polotsk; Third son of Rogvolod III Basil	1186-c.1200	Drutsk	Unknown	c.1200 Drutsk aged 59–60?	Brothers of Gleb Rogvolodovich, possibly ruled jointly.
Drutsk annexed to Vitebsk
Gleb Yurievich	c.1140? Fourth son of Yuri Yaroslavich and Anna Vsevolodovna of Grodno	19 April 1190 - 1195	Turov-Pinsk (at Turov)	Unknown three children	1195; Turov aged 54–55?	
Yaropolk Yurievich	c.1140? Fifth son of Yuri Yaroslavich and Anna Vsevolodovna of Grodno	c.1190-1204	Turov-Pinsk (at Pinsk)	Unknown one child	1204; Pinsk aged 63–64?	
Andrey Ivanovich	c.1170? Son of Ivan Yurievich	1195 - 1 June 1223	Turov-Pinsk (at Turov)	Unknown one child	1 June 1223 aged 52–53?	
Vladimir Sviatopolkovich	c.1170? First son of Sviatopolk Yurievich	1204-1228	Turov-Pinsk (at Pinsk; also in Turov since 1223)	Unknown one child	1228; Turov aged 57–58?	
Briacheslav Vasilkovich	c.1190 Vitebsk; Son of Vasilko Briacheslavich	1221-1232	Vitebsk	Unknown two children	1232; Vitebsk aged 41–42	
Rostislav Sviatopolkovich	c.1170? Second son of Sviatopolk Yurievich	1228-1232	Turov-Pinsk (at Pinsk)	Unknown	1232; Pinsk aged 61–62?	
Yuri Andreyevich	c.1170? Son of Andrey Ivanovich	1228-c.1280?	Turov-Pinsk (at Turov)	Unknown one child	1 June 1223 aged 52–53?	
Briacheslav II	c.1190 Polotsk; Son of Vasilko II and ? Davidovna of Smolensk	1232-1256	Polotsk	Unknown five children	1256; Polotsk aged 65–66?	
Iziaslav Briacheslavich	c.1210? Vitebsk; Second son of Briacheslav Vasilkovich	1232-1262 1264	Vitebsk	Unknown	1264; Vitebsk aged 53–54?	
Michael Vladimirovich	c.1190? First son of Vladimir Sviatopolkovich	1232-1247	Turov-Pinsk (at Pinsk)	Unknown	1247; Pinsk aged 56–57?	
Feodor Vladimirovich	c.1200? Second son of Vladimir Sviatopolkovich	1247-1262	Turov-Pinsk (at Pinsk)	Unknown	1262; Pinsk aged 61–62?	
Constantine the Armless	c.1230 Polotsk; Son of Briacheslav II	1256-1258 1268-1274	Polotsk	? Alexandrovna of Vladimir-Suzdal (daughter of Alexander Nevsky) two children	1292 aged 61–62?	He probably used the title rex Ruthenorum. His reign coincided with a civil war between various claimants to the Grand Duchy of Lithuania. It is known that he renounced the right to the land of Lotigola in favor of the Livonian Order.
Constantine the Armless	c.1230 Polotsk; Son of Briacheslav II	1262-1263	Vitebsk	? Alexandrovna of Vladimir-Suzdal (daughter of Alexander Nevsky) two children	1292 aged 61–62?	He probably used the title rex Ruthenorum. His reign coincided with a civil war between various claimants to the Grand Duchy of Lithuania. It is known that he renounced the right to the land of Lotigola in favor of the Livonian Order.
Polotsk annexed to Lithuania (1256-58 and from 1274)
Yuri Vladimirovich	c.1220? Third son of Vladimir Sviatopolkovich	1262-1290	Turov-Pinsk (at Pinsk)	Unknown at least one child	1290; Pinsk aged 69–70?	
Michael Kostantinovich	c.1250? Vitebsk; Son of Constantine and ? Alexandrovna of Vladimir-Suzdal	1264-1287	Vitebsk	Unknown	1307; Vitebsk aged 56–57?	
Semyon Yurievich	c.1250? Son of Yuri Andreyevich	c.1280?-1320	Turov-Pinsk (at Turov)	Unknown	1320? aged 69–70?	After his death Turov was absorbed by Lithuania.
Turov annexed to Lithuania
Vasilko Briacheslavich	c.1220? Vitebsk; Third son of Briacheslav Vasilkovich	1287-1297	Vitebsk	Unknown at least one child	1297; Vitebsk aged 76–77?	
Demid Vladimirovich	c.1220? Fourth son of Vladimir Sviatopolkovich	1290-1292	Turov-Pinsk (at Pinsk)	Unknown	1292; Pinsk aged 71–72?	
Yaroslav Yurievich	c.1270? Son of Yuri Vladimirovich	1292-c.1300?	Turov-Pinsk (at Pinsk)	Unknown at least one child	c.1300? Pinsk aged 31–32?	
Yaroslav Vasilkovich	c.1250? Vitebsk; Son of Vasilko Briacheslavich	1297-1320	Vitebsk	Unknown one child	1320; Vitebsk aged 69–70?	
Vasily Yaroslavich	c.1290? Fourth son of Yaroslav Yurievich	c.1300-1320	Turov-Pinsk (at Pinsk)	Unknown	c.1320? Pinsk aged 29–30?	After his death Pinsk was absorbed by Lithuania.
Pinsk annexed to Lithuania
Maria Yaroslavna	c.1300 Vitebsk; Daughter of Yaroslav Vasilkovich	1320-1346	Vitebsk	Algirdas, Grand Duke of Lithuania; 1317 seven children	1346 aged 45–46	The only heir to the Principality, she may have ruled with her husband. Vitebsk was then annexed to Lithuania.
Vitebsk annexed to Lithuania

=== In the Grand Duchy of Lithuania ===
Coat of arms of the Połock and Witebsk Voivodships in the Grand Duchy of Lithuania

The Principality of Polotsk escaped the Mongol invasion of Rus' in 1237–1239. However, pagan Lithuanians began consolidating lands of the principality, and in 1240 Polotsk became a vassal of the Grand Duchy of Lithuania. It officially became part of Lithuania in 1307, though it retained some degree of local autonomy until the 1390s. Then the principality was abolished and became part of the Połock Voivodeship. Other principalities had the same fate in the Lithuanian Grand Duchy, such as Minsk or Vitebsk.

==== Lithuanian princes at Polotsk ====
- 1252–1263 Tautvilas
- 1264–1267 Gerdine
- 1267–1270 Iziaslav III of Vitebsk (?)
- 1270–1290 Konstantin the Armless
- 1290–1307 occupation by the Livonian Order (Archbishopric of Riga)

===== Gediminids =====
- 1307–1336 Vainius (Voin)
- 1336–1345 Narimantas
- 1345–1399 Andrei of Polotsk
- 1377–1397 Skirgaila

=== In the Polish-Lithuanian Commonwealth and the Russian Empire ===
The Lublin Union of 1569 constituted the Polish–Lithuanian Commonwealth as an influential player in European politics and the largest multinational state in Europe. While Ukraine and Podlaskie became subjects to the Polish Crown, present-day Belarus territory was still regarded as part of the Grand Duchy of Lithuania. The new polity was dominated by densely populated Poland, which had 134 representatives in the Sejm as compared to 46 representatives from the Grand Duchy of Lithuania. However Lithuania retained much autonomy, and was governed by a separate code of laws called the Lithuanian Statutes. Mogilyov was the largest urban centre of the territory of present-day Belarus, followed by Vitebsk, Polotsk, Pinsk, Slutsk, and Brest, whose population exceeded 10,000.

Eventually by 1795 Poland was partitioned by its neighbors. Thus a new period in Belarusian history started, with all its lands annexed by the Russian Empire, in a continuing endeavor of Russian tsars of "gathering the Rus lands" started after the liberation from the Tatar yoke by Grand Duke Ivan III of Russia.
