= Princess Yaropolkovna of Minsk =

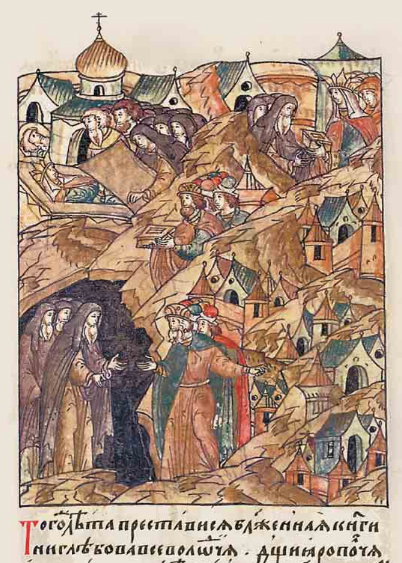
Death of the wife of Gleb Vseslavich of Minsk, illumination in the Tsar Book (16th century).

Princess Yaropolkovna of Minsk (Note: Old East Slavic description in the Kievan Chronicle: кнѧгини Глѣбоваӕ Всеславича дочи Ӕрополча Изѧславича, kniagini Glěbovaia Vseslavicha dochi Iaropolcha Iziaslavicha, "princess of Gleb Vseslavich, daughter of Iaropolk Iziaslavich", or "princess, Gleb Vseslavič's wife, daughter of Jaropolk Izjaslavič". Customary names in modern East Slavic languages: Belarusian: Анастасія Яраполкаўна, romanized: Anastasiya Yarapolkaǔna; Russian: Анастасия Ярополковна, romanized: Anastasija Jaropolkovna; Ukrainian: Анастасія Ярополківна, romanized: Anastasiya Yaropolkivna.) (1074 – 3 January 1158) was the daughter of prince Yaropolk Iziaslavich of Volhynia and Kunigunde von Orlamünde; the princess-consort of Gleb Vseslavich of Minsk (c. 1090–1118); and, according to some scholarly interpretations, princess regnant of Minsk for about 40 years after her husband's death (c. 1119–1158).

According to one single unreliable source from the late 17th century, the Kievan Synopsis by Innokentii Gizel', her first name or Christian name was "Anastasia"; therefore, some earlier historians have called her "Anastasia Yaropolkovna", or "Anastasia of Minsk". Many modern historians no longer accept that as her probable first or Christian name, and instead call her "Gleb of Minsk's widow", "the Widow Princess of Minsk", or "unknown Yaropolkovna".

== Biography ==
=== Encomium ===
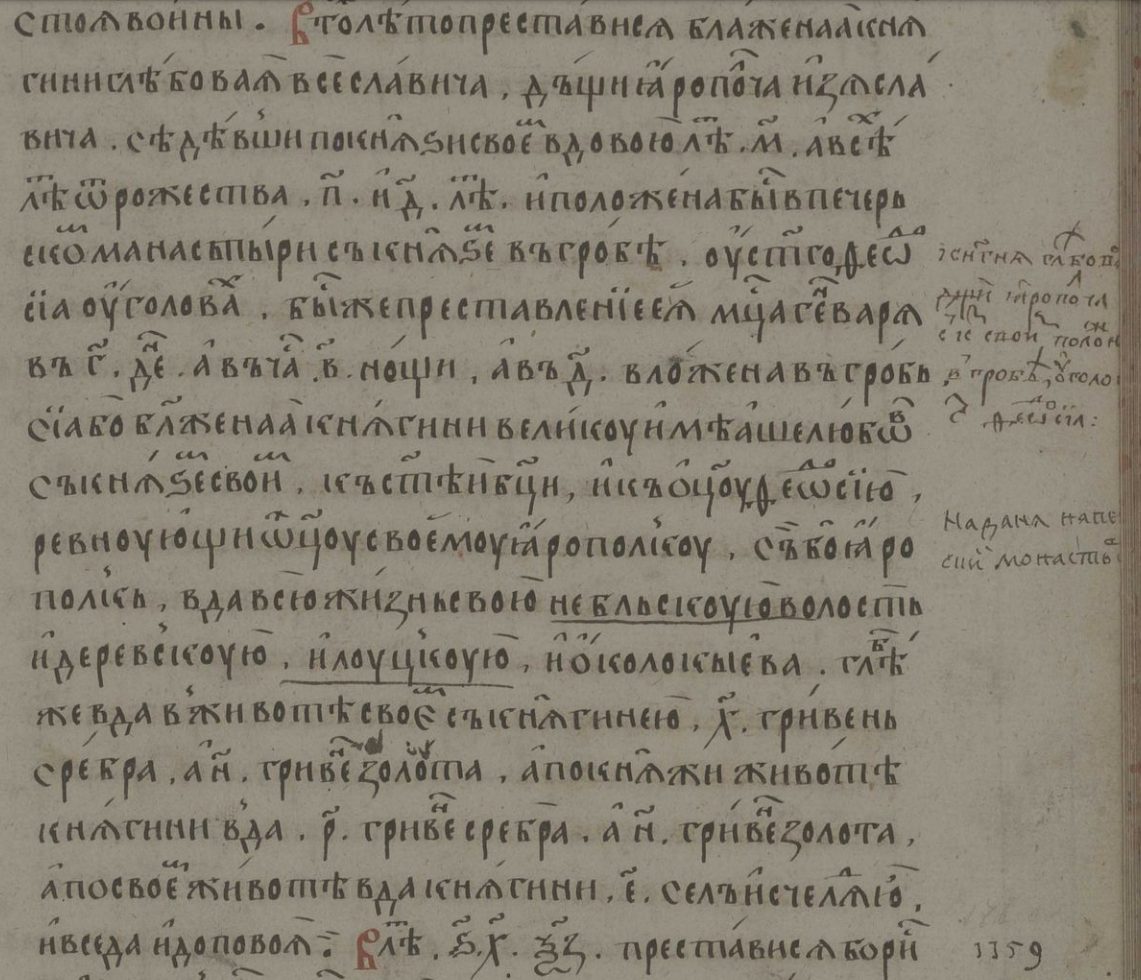

Hypatian copy (left) and Khlebnikov copy (right) of Princess Yaropolkovna's encomium.

The sources mention this woman only once directly – in the Kievan Chronicle, on the occasion of her death at age 84, sub anno 1158, where she is described as follows:

Том же лѣт̑. преставис̑ блж҃наӕ кнѧгини Глѣбоваӕ Всеславича дочи Ӕрополча Изѧславича сѣдѣвши по кн҃зи своемъ вдовою лѣт̑ м҃ а всихъ лѣт̑ и ѿ ржс̑тва .п҃. и .д҃ . лѣт̑.
(Tom zhe lětě prestavis’ blazhenaia kniagini Glěbovaia Vseslavicha dochi Iaropolcha Iziaslavicha sěděvshi po kniazi svoem” vdovoiu let” .m. a vsikh” lět” i ot” rozhestva .ts. i.d. lět”.).
"In the same year died the blessed princess of Gleb Vseslavich, daughter of Iaropolk Iziaslavich, having ruled after her husband['s death] as a widow for forty years." (Inés García de la Puente, 2012).
"In that same year the blessed princess, Gleb Vseslavič's wife, daughter of Jaropolk Izjaslavič, who had been ruling forty years in the place of her prince as a widow, died." (Lisa L. Heinrich, 1977) (Note: Raffensperger (2024) slightly updated Heinrich's spelling: "In that same year the blessed princess [kniaginia], Gleb Vseslavich's wife, daughter of Iaropolk Iziaslavich, who had been ruling forty years in the place of her prince [kniaz'] as a widow, died.")

The obituary, which has the style of an encomium, goes on to narrate she was buried in the Assumption Cathedral of the Kyiv Pechersk Lavra, next to her husband in the tomb by the side of father Theodosius of Kiev. The level of detail provided about princess Yaropolkovna of Minsk is unique amongst all obituarities of princesses in the Kievan Chronicle, which contains 72 announcements of princely deaths, 60 of which are about men who died as princes (84%), and 12 of them are about women who died as princesses (16%). For example, it is by far the longest obituary, and it is very specific about the time and place of her death and burial. (Note: 'in the month of January, on the third day, at the second hour of the night, and at the fourth hour she was deposited in the tomb.') Only 7 out of 12 princesses are given a date of death, only 3 a burial place, and Yaropolkovna is the only one with an exact hour of demise and entombment.

The author of the Kievan Chronicle indicates that during Gleb's lifetime the couple had pledged 600 hryvnias of silver and 50 hryvnias of gold, and after the prince's death the woman gave 100 hryvnias of silver and 50 hryvnias of gold, and also bequeathed 5 villages with челѧдью chelyad'yu (Garcia de la Puente: "slaves"; Heinrich: "serving people") and all property, 'even her povoi' (Note: A повой (povoi) was a woman's head covering, as well as a veil, shroud. Heinrich (1977) translated this as "before she became a nun", but Garcia de la Puente (2012) pointed out that 'nothing is said about whether she became a nun', instead translating the passage as: "up to and including her headdress", 'which probably has a figurative sense of “she gave the shirt off her back.” That is, the chronicler says that Gleb's widow gave the Caves Monastery absolutely everything she had.') to the above-mentioned monastery.

Later chronicles such as the Nikon Chronicle and Voskresensk Chronicle repeat the information provided by the Kievan Chronicle almost verbatim, and provide no additional clues. The late-17th-century Kievan Synopsis of Gizel' adds that her first or Christian name was "Anastasia", but no source or reason for this information is provided, and subsequent authors only repeated what Gizel' wrote, therefore 'there is not enough reliable information to conclude that the name of Gleb's widow was Anastasia'.

=== Marriage ===
It is not known in detail when would-be princess Yaropolkovna and Gleb Vsevslavich married, but the date can be calculated. For example, after the murder of Yaropolk in 1086/7, Kunigunde moved to Germany, taking her youngest daughter (Mechthild or Matilda) with her, where she got married. Her older daughter, the future princess of Minsk, stayed in her home country. She was probably already under the care of a man, or at least engaged to one. In that era, people were married from the age of 12, which makes 1086 the earliest possible date of marriage, that is, during her father's lifetime, although the newlyweds could have been married in the early 1090s, but no later than April 1093. In or around the year 1090 seems most probable.

=== Historical context ===
The marriage was probably the result of the desire of prince Vseslav Bryachislavich of Polotsk to enlist the support of the family of prince Iziaslav I Yaroslavich of Kiev (died 1078) in the struggle against his brother Vsevolod Yaroslavich (prince of Kiev 1078–1093). According to Litvina & Uspenskij (2013), this was the first matrimonial union in Kievan Rus' between members of the reigning clan, the so-called Rurikids (or Volodimerovichi): Gleb and princess Yaropolkovna, as great-great-grandchildren of Volodimer I of Kiev in the male line, were related in the eighth degree; marriages between siblings-in-law up to the seventh degree were forbidden by church norms, so foreign women usually became the wives of Rus' princes.

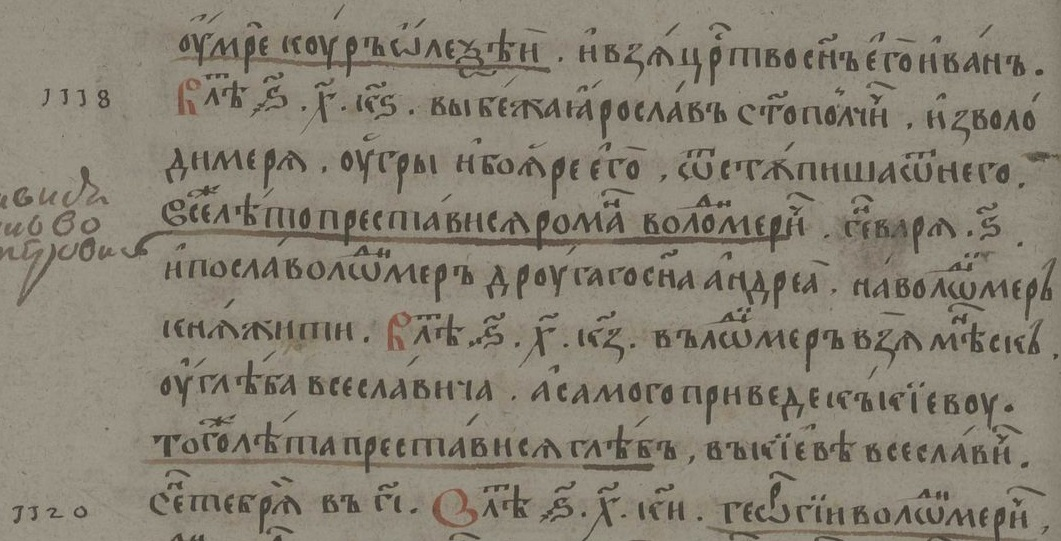
'In the year 1119, Vladimir (Monomakh) took Minsk from Gleb Vseslavič, whom he brought to Kiev. That same year on the thirteenth of September, Gleb Vseslavič died in Kiev.' – Kievan Chronicle (Khlebnikov Codex), translated by Lisa Lynn Heinrich (1977)

When Vseslav died in 1101, the Principality of Polotsk split into six appanages: Polotsk, Drutsk, Minsk (to Gleb Vseslavich), Vitebsk, Lukoml', and probably Iziaslavl' (Zaslawye). Soon thereafter, internecine conflict broke out between the six sons of Vseslav, several times prompting the intervention of the prince of Kiev and other southern princes: Vladimir II Monomakh intervened in 1115 (6623) and/or 1116 (6624), again in c. 1119–21, and Mstislav I of Kiev in 1127, rearranging the balance of power in the broader Polotskian realm. It was during Monomakh's second intervention that Minsk was captured, Gleb Vseslavich was taken captive to Kiev, where he died, thus widowing his wife, princess Yaropolkovna of Minsk. It is unclear what happened to the principality of Minsk thereafter, but Inés García de la Puente (2012) theorised, based on the available textual, linguistic, historical and archaeological evidence, that Monomakh and subsequent princes of Kiev continuously left princess Yaropolkovna to reign in Minsk under their supervision, rather than appointing yet more quarrelsome sons or grandsons of Vseslav, especially after most of them were exiled in 1129/30. Raffensperger & Birnbaum (2021) accepted Garcia de la Puente's explanation.

In the year 1129 (6637) or 1130 (6638), Mstislav sent several Vseslavichi princes of Polotsk into a forced exile in Byzantium, which the Kievan Chronicle explains in a flashback sub anno 1140 (6648) as Mstislav punishing these Polotskian princes for allying themselves with the Polovtsi instead of helping him to fight against them. It is not known which sons and grandsons of Vseslav were exiled to Constantinople, nor whether or not these included any sons of princess Yaropolkovna of Minsk, nor whether the two who are mentioned as returning to Kievan Rus' in 1140 included any of them either. Her oldest son Rostislav Glebovich did reign as prince of Polotsk between 1151 and 1159, and might have had some governing role in Minsk before 1151, but the sources are unclear.

As for who else could have reigned in Minsk between 1119 and 1158, the Suzdalian Chronicle claims that when Yaropolk II of Kiev acceded the Kievan throne in 1132/3, he gave his nephew Iziaslav Mstislavich Turov, Pinsk and Minsk, perhaps as part of his possession of Polotsk rather than all four separately, although this is uncertain. Iziaslav would voluntarily leave them for Novgorod in 1135 anyway, and "Minsk" is never mentioned again in the Suzdalian Chronicle, and only once more (namely 1151) in the Kievan Chronicle before the princess' death in 1158, creating a vacuum in which the widow princess could have reigned in Minsk. It is not until the year 1159, one year after her death, that her second son Volodar' Glebovich is said to be prince of Minsk.

=== Archaeological evidence ===
No seals dating to after the 1120s of any living male Vseslavichi princes of Polotsk and its appanages have been found; instead, archaeologists have found a remarkably high number of seals belonging to female members of the Vseslavichi clan after the 1120s. Soviet archaeologist and historian Valentin Yanin noted in 1970 the possibility that princesses ruled in the Vseslavichi territories of Polotsk and its appanages between 1129 and the 1150s, during the Byzantine exile of the male princes. Building on Yanin's and other observations, Soviet and Russian historian Natalia Pushkareva developed the concept of a 'Polotsk Matriarchate' in her 1989 book Женщины Древней Руси ("Women of Ancient Rus'"), highlighting other Rus' princesses of the 11th and 12th centuries who owned their own seals, thus implying princely authority.

== Children ==
She had at least three sons:

- Rostislav, ruled Polotsk between 1151 and 1159;
- Volodar', appears as prince of Minsk in 1159;
- Vsevolod, received Strezhev in 1159.

Russian historian Aleksandr Nazarenko expressed uncertainty as to whether Rostislav was Gleb's son by princess Yaropolkovna, suggesting that he could have been born in an unknown first marriage. The reason for the doubts was that in this case, Rostislav married his second cousin, a case forbidden by religious canons, but which did occur. At the same time, the origin of Rostislav's wife has not been established for certain, so princess Yaropolkovna could well have been Rostislav's mother.

== Legacy ==
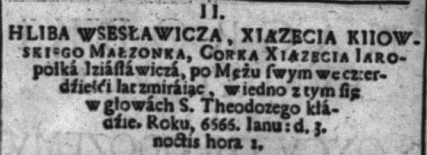
Epitaph from the Teratugrima, mentioning "The wife of Kievan prince Hlib Wsesławic, daughter of prince Iaropołk Iziásłáwic".

The memory of prince Gleb Vseslavich and princess Yaropolkovna of Minsk lived on in the Kyiv Pechersk Lavra for a long time. A cathedral monk of the Caves Monastery Athanasius Kalnofoysky in his work Teratugrima (1638) wrote them a poetic epitaph in Polish. The author called the piety and devoutness of the dead the main virtue worthy of honour, ‘the halo of Saint Theodosius is not opposed to his absence in the usual mortals, but illuminates them with his grace'.

The unknown author of the Kievan Synopsis claimed to have found the name of the princess as "Anastasia", although it is not mentioned in earlier sources, including the epitaph. The Synopsis called Gleb Vseslavich (Hlib Wsesławic) a 'Kievan prince,' being inscribed, like other Rurikids, in the foundation of the historical memory of the Ukrainian identity of that time.

== Bibliography ==
=== Primary sources ===
- Kievan Chronicle (c. 1200), sub anno 1158
  - (Church Slavonic critical edition) Shakhmatov, Aleksey Aleksandrovich, ed. (1908). Ipat'evskaya letopis' Ипатьевская лѣтопись [The Hypatian Codex]. Complete Collection of Russian Chronicles (PSRL) (in Church Slavic). Vol. 2 (3rd ed.). Saint Petersburg: Typography of M. A. Aleksandrov / Izbornyk. pp. 285–301.
  - (modern English translation) Heinrich, Lisa Lynn (1977). The Kievan Chronicle: A Translation and Commentary (PhD diss.). Nashville, Tennessee: Vanderbilt University. p. 616. ProQuest 7812419
  - (modern Ukrainian translation) Makhnovets, Leonid (1989). Літопис Руський за Іпатським списком [Rus' Chronicle according to the Hypatian Codex] (in Ukrainian). Kyiv: Dnipro. p. 591. ISBN 5-308-00052-2. — A modern annotated Ukrainian translation of the Kievan Chronicle based on the Hypatian Codex with comments from the Khlebnikov Codex.

=== Literature ===
- Garcia de la Puente, Inés (2012). "Gleb of Minsk's Widow: Neglected Evidence on the Rule of a Woman in Rus'ian History?". Russian History. 39 (3). Brill Deutschland: 347–378. doi:10.1163/18763316-03903006. ISSN 0094-288X.
- García de la Puente, Inés (2017). "The Widow Princess of Minsk". Portraits of Medieval Eastern Europe, 900–1400. Routledge. pp. 15–22. doi:10.4324/9781315204178-2. ISBN 978-1-315-20417-8. Edited by Donald Ostrowski and Christian Raffensperger.
- Raffensperger, Christian; Birnbaum, David J. (2021). "N. N. Iaropolkovna. b. 1074 – d. 1158". Rusian genealogy at genealogy.obdurodon.org.
- Raffensperger, Christian (2024). Name Unknown: The Life of a Rusian Queen. Routledge. p. 232. doi:10.4324/9781003325185. ISBN 978-1-04-003014-1.
