= Principality of Minsk =

Slavic state in present day Belarus (1101-1326)

Coordinates: 54°0′N 27°30′E

Principality of Minsk Менскае княства (Belarusian)
- 1101–1326
- Principality of Minsk (Менскае княства) in Gleb Vseslavich's time early 12th century
- Capital: Minsk (Mensk)
- Common languages: Old East Slavic, Ruthenian
- Religion: Eastern Orthodox
- Government: Monarchy
- Prince
  - 1101–1109: Gleb Vseslavich
  - 1146–1165: Rostislav Glebovich
- History
  - Established: 1101
  - Disestablished: 1326
Preceded by	Succeeded by
Principality of Polotsk	Minsk Voivodeship
- Today part of: Belarus

The Principality of Minsk was an appanage principality of the Principality of Polotsk and centered on the city of Minsk (today in Belarus). It existed from its founding in 1101 until it was nominally annexed by the Grand Duchy of Lithuania in 1242, and then fell under de facto annexation in 1326.

== Geography ==
The principality originally occupied territories around the Drut, Svislach and Berezina river basins. Besides the capital city of Minsk, other population centers in the principality included Barysaw, Lahojsk, Zaslawye, Orsha and the historical town of Drutsk.

== History ==
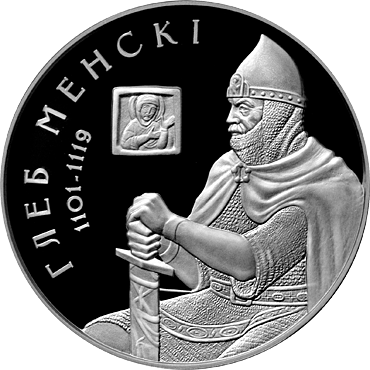
Commemorative coin dedicated to Gleb Vseslavich (2007)

The area around Minsk was controlled by the Principality of Polotsk beginning from the 10th century. Following the death of Vseslav of Polotsk in 1101, Polotsk was divided into six smaller principalities each to be inherited by one of his six surviving sons. Vseslav's second born son, Gleb Vseslavich inherited the lands surrounding Minsk and started the Minsk branch of the princes of Polotsk.

Almost immediately following his father's death, Gleb started a war against his brothers Davyd, prince of Polotsk and Roman, prince of Drutsk to expand his territory. In 1106, he had partaken in a raid against the Baltic tribes in Semigallia. In 1116, he started a war with Vladimir II Monomakh of the Principality of Kiev and sacked the town of Slutsk. In retaliation, Vladimir marched towards Minsk and laid a two-month siege; Gleb sent peace envoys to the enemy camp and agreed to a peace treaty on the condition of good behavior on his part. Nevertheless, Gleb resumed his hostilities in 1117, attacking Smolensk. Vladimir Monomakh sent his son Mstislav to Minsk with another large army, besieging and taking Minsk, and bringing Gleb to Kiev as prisoner, where he died in September 1119.

Thereafter, the principality of Minsk fell under Kievan influence, with Gleb's widow, Princess Yaropolkovna of Minsk, most likely reigning after him for 40 years until 1158, as reported in the Kievan Chronicle. One year after her death, her son Volodar Glebovich is mentioned as the prince of Minsk for the first time. Volodar and his descendants would fight wars with the princes of Drutsk and Vitebsk. This period saw the principality's relationship with the Grand Duchy of Lithuania grow, and in 1164, Volodar with the help of the Lithuanians, won a battle against the prince of Polotsk, which affirmed the principality's independence from Polotsk.

In the 13th century, the influence of Lithuanian princes grew and the princes of Minsk were virtually vassals of the Grand Duchy of Lithuania. Minsk escaped the Mongol invasion of Kievan Rus' in 1237–1239. However, in later years it was attacked by nomadic invaders from the Golden Horde, who ravaged and vassalized many principalities to the south. In 1242, Minsk was annexed by the Grand Duchy of Lithuania. In 1249, a combined Minsk and Lithuanian army repelled a Tatar-Mongol invasion.

The city of Minsk oversaw periods of growth and prosperity during Lithuanian reign and many local nobles enjoyed high ranking in the society of the Grand Duchy. For instance, in 1326, a treaty between Grand Duchy of Lithuania and the city of Novgorod was signed for Lithuanian Prince Gediminas by Vasily, the then ruler of Minsk.

In 1413, when the Grand Duchy of Lithuania and the Kingdom of Poland signed the Union of Horodło, the Principality of Minsk ceased to exist and the city became the center of the newly created Minsk Voivodeship.

== See also ==
- History of Minsk
- Principality of Slutsk

== Bibliography ==
=== Primary sources ===
- Kievan Chronicle (c. 1200)
  - (Church Slavonic critical edition) Shakhmatov, Aleksey Aleksandrovich, ed. (1908). Ipat'evskaya letopis' Ипатьевская лѣтопись [The Hypatian Codex]. Complete Collection of Russian Chronicles (PSRL) (in Church Slavic). Vol. 2 (3rd ed.). Saint Petersburg: Typography of M. A. Aleksandrov / Izbornyk. pp. 285–301.
  - (modern English translation) Heinrich, Lisa Lynn (1977). The Kievan Chronicle: A Translation and Commentary (PhD diss.). Nashville, Tennessee: Vanderbilt University. p. 616. ProQuest 7812419
  - (modern Ukrainian translation) Makhnovets, Leonid (1989). Літопис Руський за Іпатським списком [Rus' Chronicle according to the Hypatian Codex] (in Ukrainian). Kyiv: Dnipro. p. 591. ISBN 5-308-00052-2. — A modern annotated Ukrainian translation of the Kievan Chronicle based on the Hypatian Codex with comments from the Khlebnikov Codex.

=== Literature ===
- Fennell, J. (2014). The Crisis of Medieval Russia 1200-1304. Longman History of Russia. Taylor & Francis. p. 17. ISBN 978-1-317-87314-3.
- Garcia de la Puente, Inés (2012). "Gleb of Minsk's Widow: Neglected Evidence on the Rule of a Woman in Rus'ian History?". Russian History. 39 (3). Brill Deutschland: 347–378. doi:10.1163/18763316-03903006. ISSN 0094-288X.
- García de la Puente, Inés (2017). "The Widow Princess of Minsk". Portraits of Medieval Eastern Europe, 900–1400. Routledge. pp. 15–22. doi:10.4324/9781315204178-2. ISBN 978-1-315-20417-8. Edited by Donald Ostrowski and Christian Raffensperger.
- Raffensperger, Christian; Birnbaum, David J. (2021). "N. N. Iaropolkovna. b. 1074 – d. 1158". Rusian genealogy at genealogy.obdurodon.org.
