= Principality of Vitebsk =

European polity

Coordinates: 55°N 30°E

Principality of Vitebsk Віцебскае княства
- 1101–1508
- The Principality of Vitebsk (16.) in 1385.
- Capital: Vitebsk
- Common languages: Old East Slavic
- Religion: Eastern Orthodox
- Government: Monarchy (until 1393); Viceroyalty (since 1393)
- History
  - Established: 1101
  - Disestablished: 1508
Preceded by	Succeeded by
Principality of Polotsk	Grand Duchy of Lithuania

The Principality of Vitebsk (Belarusian: Віцебскае княства) was a Ruthenian principality centered on the city of Vitebsk in modern Belarus, that existed from its founding in 1101 until it was nominally inherited into the Grand Duchy of Lithuania in 1320. Vitebsk would later fall under the complete authority of Lithuania in 1508.

== History ==
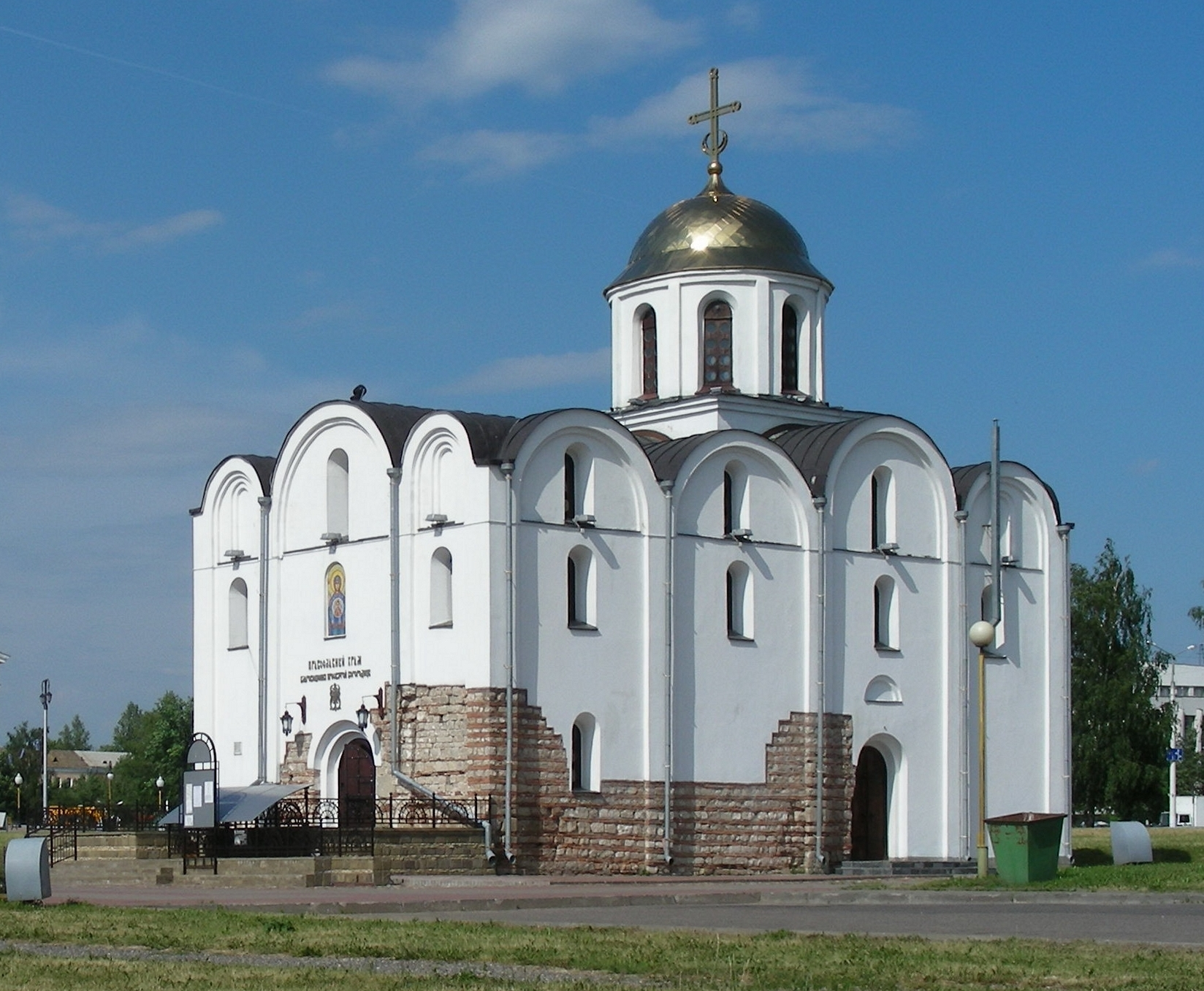
Church of Annunciation, erected in Vitebsk in the 12th century

The area around Vitebsk was controlled by the Principality of Polotsk beginning from the 10th century. Following the death of Vseslav of Polotsk in 1101, Polotsk was divided into six smaller principalities each to be inherited by one of his six surviving sons. Vseslav's second-born son, Sviatoslav Vseslavich inherited the lands surrounding Vitebsk and started the Vitebsk branch of the princes of Polotsk.

In 1106, Sviatoslav had partaken in a raid against the Baltic tribes in Semigallia with his brothers. In 1127, the prince of Kiev, Mstislav Vladimirovich, began a war with the princes of Polotsk over trade routes and pillaged several cities including Polotsk. Following the death of Rogvolod Vseslavich in 1128, Davyd Vseslavich inherited Polotsk and opposed the truce between Rogvolod and Kiev and renewed the conflict. During the new campaigning in 1129, Mstislav Vladimirovich captured the three remaining sons of Vseslav (Davyd, Sviatoslav and Rostislav) and annexed Polotsk and its vassals including Vitebsk. Mstislav gave the title of Polotsk to his son Svyatopolk Mstislavich. Sviatoslav and his brothers along with their immediate families were exiled to Constantinople where Sviatoslav died in 1130.

Sviatoslav's son Vasilko Sviatoslavich, after having likely served as commander under emperor John II Komnenos, returned from his exile in Constantinople in either 1131 or 1132 to claim his inheritance as Prince of Vitebsk. In 1132, the residents of Polotsk unhappy with the rule of Svyatopolk Mstislavich, invited Vasilko to claim the Principality of Polotsk. Vasilko accepted the offer and gave the title of Vitebsk over to his son Vseslav Vasilkovich. Under the reign of Vseslav, the other exiled Polotsk princes were allowed to return in 1139 and the princes of Vitebsk, Minsk and Drutsk began to quarrel over the control of Polotsk after Vseslav claimed Polotsk in 1162. In 1165–1167 due to the feudal strife, the principality of Vitebsk was shortly acquired by the princes of Smolensk. However this submission was short-lived, and Vitebsk soon regained independence and given to Briachislav Vasilkovich, another son of Vasilko. During this time period, the principality had strong trade connections to Riga.

In 1186, the principality of Vitebsk again fell under the influence of Smolensk which angered the princes of Polotsk and Chernigov who in 1195 marched against the prince of Smolensk. As a result of this campaign, Vitebsk again fell under the rule of Polotsk. In the beginning of the thirteenth century, Vitebsk had close relationships with the princes of Vladimir-Suzdal but due to the swift diplomatic manoeuvring of Lithuanian princes, the principality fell under the influence of the Grand Duchy of Lithuania when Grand Duke Algirdas married to the daughter of the last prince of Vitebsk Maria of Vitebsk. It is not known who succeeded after the death of the second Briachislav Vasilkovich in 1232. However, in 1254, the nephew of Mindaugas, Tautvilas was given Polotsk, and he placed his son Constantine as ruler of Vitebsk in 1262. The last prince of Vitebsk was Jaroslav Vasilkovich, whose daughter Mary was married to a Lithuanian prince. Jaroslav died in 1320 without heirs and Vitebsk was incorporated into the Grand Duchy of Lithuania.

The Principality of Vitebsk was inherited into the Grand Duchy of Lithuania in 1320 but retained its independence until 1393, when it became a viceroyalty. In 1508, the Voivodeship of Vitebsk was created out of the lands of the former principality along with the cities of Orsha, Drutsk and Mogilyov.

== Princes ==
- Sviatoslav Vseslavich (1101–1129)
- Vasilko Sviatoslavich (1129–1132)
- Vseslav Vasilkovich (1132–1164)
- Roman Vyacheslavich (1162–1165)
- Davyd Rostislavich (1165–1167) Smolensk Ruled
- Briachislav Vasilkovich (1168–1175)
- Vseslav Vasilkovich (1175–1178) (Second Term)
- Briachislav Vasilkovich (1178–1181) (Second Term)
- Vseslav Vasilkovich (1180–1186) (Third Term)
- Vasilko Briachislavich (1186–1221)
- Briachislav Vasilkovich (1221–1232)
- ??? (1232–1262)
- Constantine Bezrukiy (1262–1263)
- Izyaslav Briachislavich (1264)
- Mikhail Konstantinovich (1270–1280/97)
- Vasilko Briachislavich (1297–1320)
- Algirdas (1320–1377) (from 1345, Grand Duke of Lithuania)
- Uliana of Tver (1377–1391)
- Vytautas (1391–1392)
- Fedor Vesna (1392–1393)
- Švitrigaila (1393)

== See also ==
- Principality of Minsk
- Principality of Slutsk
- Bibliography of Russian history
