= Turov, Belarus =

Town in Gomel Region, Belarus

Turov Тураў (Belarusian) Туров (Russian) Turaw
- Town
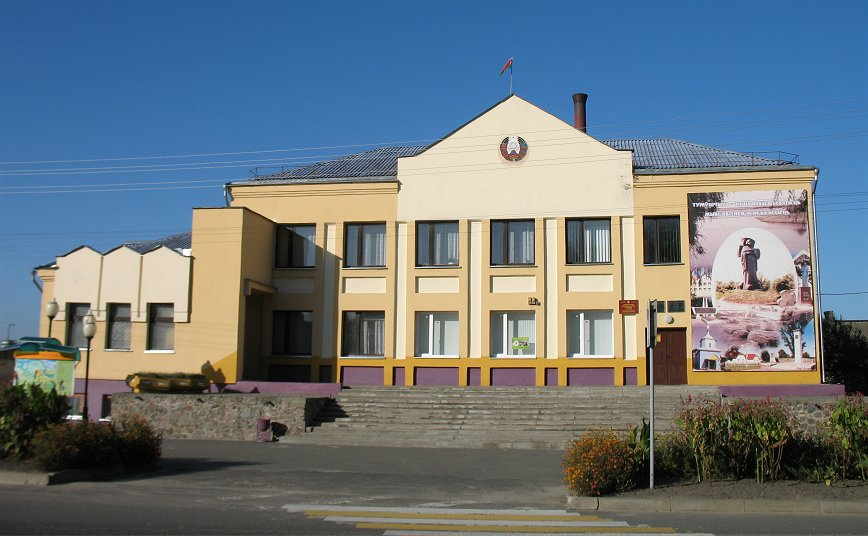
- Town Hall

- Flag Coat of arms

- Location within Belarus
- Coordinates: 52°4′12″N 27°44′24″E
- Country: Belarus
- Region: Gomel Region
- District: Zhytkavichy District

Population (2025)
  - Total: 2,761
- Time zone: UTC+3 (MSK)
- Postal code: 247980
- Area code: +375 2353
- License plate: 3

Turov, or Turaw, (Note: Belarusian: Тураў, romanized: Turaŭ; Russian: Туров; Lithuanian: Turava; Ukrainian: Турів, romanized: Turiv; Polish: Turów; Yiddish: טוראָוו.) is a town in Zhytkavichy District, Gomel Region, Belarus. As of 2025, it has a population of 2,761.

It served as the capital of the Principality of Turov during the Middle Ages.

== History ==
Turov was an ancient capital of the Dregovich tribe - one of the three Eastern Slavic tribes that are considered ancestors of the modern Belarusian people (the others being Krivichs and Drevlians). Turov was first mentioned in the Tale of Bygone Years from 980. It is located in the southern part of Belarus, in the historical region of Polesia.

According to legend, the city was founded at the crossing of Yazda and Strumen rivers by Duke Tur - hence the name Turov. Other etymology draws the name from Tur, the Slavic name of the Aurochs. Both rivers join with the Pripyat river, which in turn flows into the Dnieper and then leads to the Black Sea. This river route was known to Vikings, who used it extensively for communication and during their frequent raids to Constantinople.

The Varangian dynasty of Ruriks became dukes in the neighboring Duchy of Kiev. Soon Turov also came under the dominion of a local branch of dukes of the Rurik Dynasty and particularly of Izyaslav I, son of Yaroslav the Wise. In that period the town of Turaŭ was not only an important trade center within the Kievan Rus', due to its proximity to major trade routes running from the Baltic Sea to the Byzantine Empire, but also one of the most important cities of the Rus among Kiev, Chernihiv, Novgorod, and Pereyaslav. The Prince of Turov, the main contender to the throne of the Kievan Rus' before their subjugation to the Monomakhs considerably influenced the early politics of the neighboring Duchy of Poland in the 11th century having together an intertwined history.

Thanks to the towns' strategic location, many different crafts were developed and practiced in Turov. It was also home to bishops Cyril of Turov and Laverentiy of Turov. In 1005 the first Roman Christian bishopric on the territory of Belarus was founded in Turov. The town's period of prosperity ended with a number of feudal conflicts in the 12th century. Soon afterwards Turaŭ lost much of its importance as well as its autonomy.

In 1320 Turov became a part of the Grand Duchy of Lithuania having closely assimilated with the Prince of Minsk. In 1430 it became a private town of the Grand Duke Svitrigaila. In the end of the 15th century Turaŭ became a property of Grand Court Marshal of Lithuania Michal Glinski. In 1502 it was damaged by a Tatar invasion. After Glinski's betrayal and escape to Grand Duchy of Moscow in 1508, Turov was confiscated by the family of Konstanty Ostrogski, who started the reconstruction, but the town was yet again destroyed by the Tatars in 1521. The Ostrogski family owned the town for more than a century, until it was given as a dowry to the Sapieha and then Potocki magnate families. During The Deluge the town was taken by Muscovy, but was soon retaken by Janusz Radziwiłł. After the period of constant wars with Muscovy, the town was severely damaged. By 1667, Turov had only 111 households left of the 401 there in 1648.

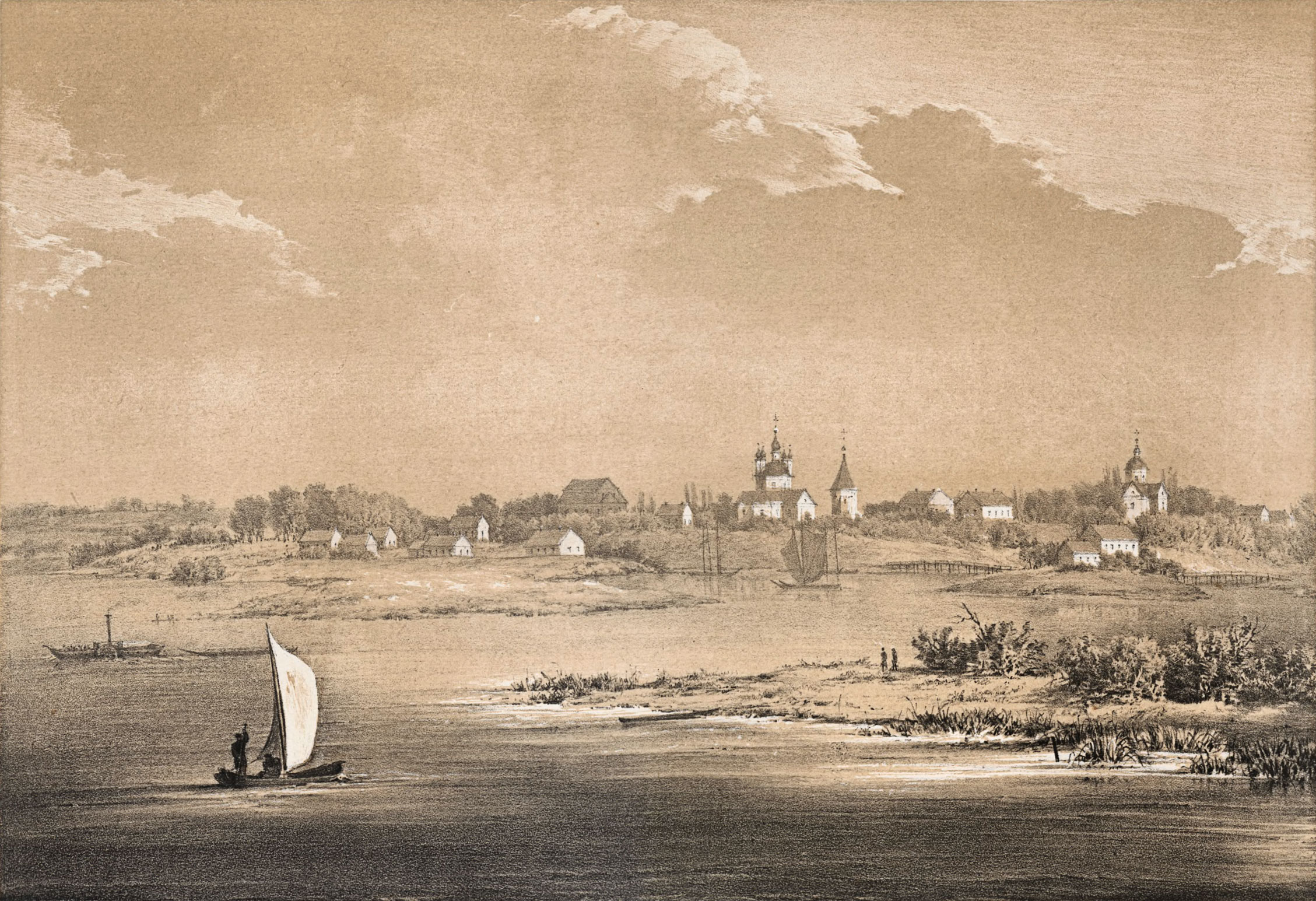
19th-century painting by Napoleon Orda

The town never fully recovered. After the Second Partition of Poland in 1793 it was annexed by Russia and remained a small, provincial town for most of the 19th century. From that time onwards it shared the fate of the nearby town of Gomel.

in 1810, the wooden Orthodox Church of All Saints was built in Turov. It has survived down to this day, never having been rebuilt. Inside the church are kept the weeping icon of St Nicholas, and two old Christian crosses covered in legends and stories. The church remains as a centre of Orthodox life in the town.

=== Jewish population ===
The shtetl (Jewish community) in Turov began in the 16th century. The population of Jewish people reached its peak at the end of the 19th century. After that time they began to emigrate to larger cities and to other countries. Turov was subjected to pogroms (violence against Jewish communities), but the Jewish population managed to hang on through World War I and the Russian Revolution. Even after the Bolsheviks took over, the Jewish population continued to carry on their traditions and there was a degree of tolerance among the non-Jewish population of Turov. Greater efforts to suppress religious activity began in the 1930s.

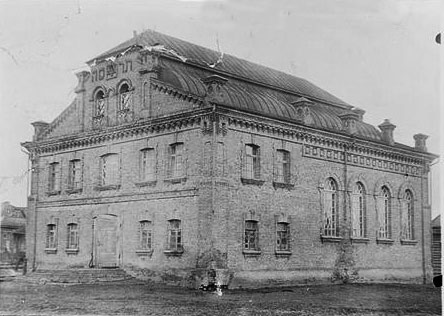
Synagogue in 1905

In 1921 two schools opened in Turov, both a general school and a Yiddish school; both were attended by Jewish students. There were three synagogues in Turov, one Misnagdim and two Hasidic. All three closed in the early 1930s.

The Jewish population in Turov was wiped out during World War II. Some Jews volunteered to join the Soviet army to fight the Germans. The first German army units to come through Turov, in July 1941, did nothing to the Jewish population. The Holocaust began with the arrival of later units. Very few families returned after the war and as of 2003 there were only three Jewish people living in Turov.

== Town flag ==
The Turov Flag was accepted by town's council on September 27, 2001 and was included in Belarus' coats of arms registry on January 23, 2002.

Additionally, it has a rectangular form with width to length ratio equal 1 : 2, and consists of three horizontal bands: blue (6/9 of width), white (1/9 of width) and red (2/9 of width).

== Notable people ==
- Aryeh Leib Shifman (1891–1937), rabbi
- Skarżyński noble family.

== See also ==
- Heck Cattle - Turov's name was based on Aurochs, and a herd of Heck Cattle was introduced into Turov region as a practice of rewilding.

== Books ==
- (in Belarusian, Russian and English) T.A.Khvagina (2005) POLESYE from the Bug to the Ubort, Minsk Vysheysha shkola, ISBN 985-06-1153-7
- (in Belarusian, Russian and English) 2016, Turov Rhapsody, Minsk, Four Quarters Book Publishing, ISBN 978-985-581-028-6
