= Fedor Vesna =

14th-century ruler

- Died: 1393
- Occupation: Falconry
- Title: governor (vicegerent) of Vitebsk 1392-1393

Fedor Vesna (Belarusian: Фёдар Вясна, Russian: Фёдор Весна Polish: Fedor Wesna, Theodor Wiosna) was a famous 14th century falconer and ruler of Vitebsk from 1392 to 1393.

Fedor's fame as a successful falconer introduced him to Jogaila, the Grand Duke of Lithuania and King of Poland, with whom he became friends. When Fedor retired from falconry in the 1390s, Jogaila granted him the title of duke and after the death of the last ruler of Principality of Vitebsk, Uliana of Tver in 1392, Jogaila abolished the principality and set Fedor to rule its lands. As Fedor Vesna was neither a member of the Gediminids Dynasty nor of noble birth, his exaltation was poorly received in the Grand Duchy and made him a distinct target for rival ambitions. Švitrigaila, the younger brother of Jogaila and duke of Polotsk, briefly captured Vitebsk in 1393. According to some Lithuanian chronicles, Švitrigaila killed Fedor Vesna upon the capture of Vitebsk.

== Sources ==
- Wolff J. Senatorowie i dygnitarze Wielkiego Księstwa Litewskiego: 1386–1795. Kraków, 1885. p. 85.
