= Principality of Turov =

10th–14th century East Slavic principality in modern-day Belarus

Coordinates: 52°10′N 26°45′E

Principality of Turov and Pinsk
- 10th century–14th century
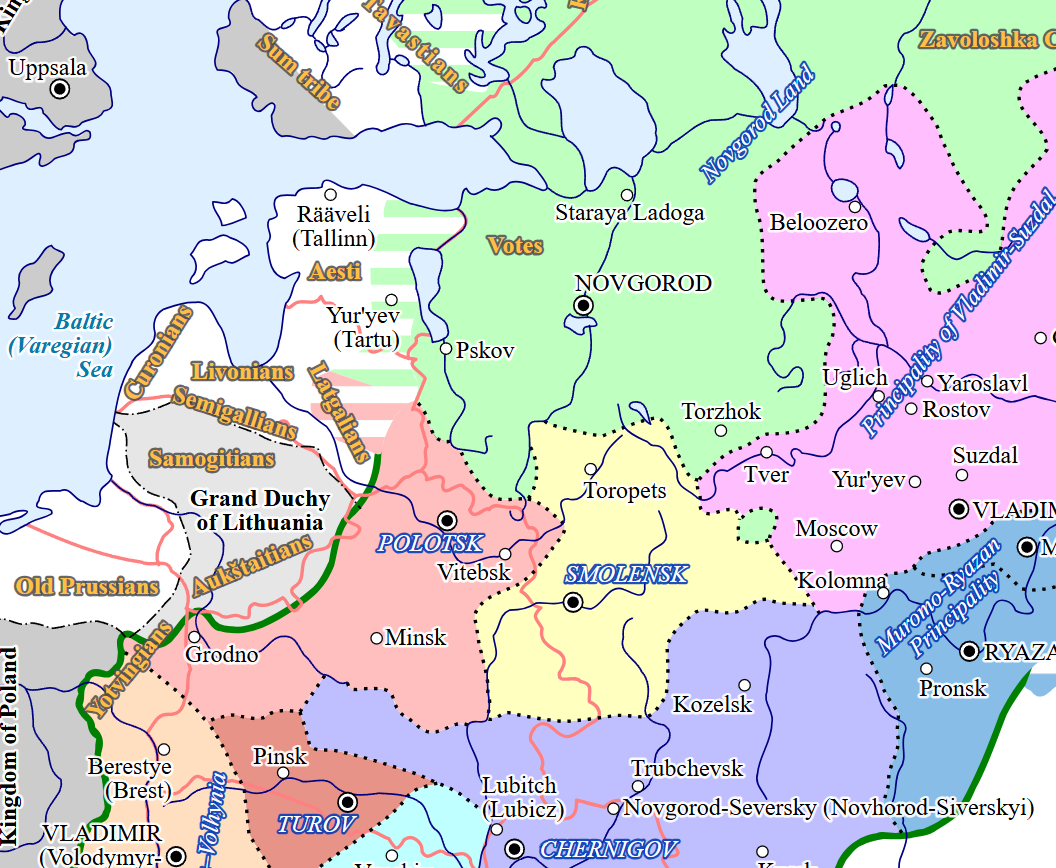
- Principality of Turov and Pinsk (1237)
- Status: Principality
- Capital: Turov; Pinsk
- Common languages: Old East Slavic
- Religion: Eastern Orthodoxy
- Government: Monarchy
- Prince
  - 950–980: Tur
- Legislature: Veche
- History
  - Established: 10th century
  - Incorporation into the Grand Duchy of Lithuania: 14th century
Preceded by	Succeeded by
Dregovichs	Grand Duchy of Lithuania / Grand Duchy of Lithuania

The Principality of Turov, later called the Principality of Turov and Pinsk (Belarusian: Турава-Пінскае княства, romanized: Turava-Pinskaje kniastva; Russian: Турово-Пинское княжество, romanized: Turovo-Pinskoye knyazhestvo; Ukrainian: Турово-Пінське князівство, romanized: Turovo-Pins'ke knyazivstvo), also known as Turovian Rus', was a medieval principality of Kievan Rus' from the 10th century on the territory of modern-day Belarus and northern Ukraine. The princes of Turov often served as grand princes early in the 10th and 11th centuries. Its capital was Turov (Turaŭ), and other important cities included Pinsk, Mazyr, Slutsk, Lutsk, Brest, and Volodymyr.

Until the 12th century, the principality was very closely associated with the principalities of Kiev and Volhynia. Later, for a short period of time until the Mongol invasion, it enjoyed a wide degree of autonomy when it was annexed to the Kingdom of Galicia–Volhynia. In the 14th century, it became part of the Grand Duchy of Lithuania.

== History ==
The Principality of Turov originated mainly from the Dregovich tribe and partially the Drevlyans. While circumstances of its creation are not clearly known, the Principality as mentioned in the Primary Chronicle existed in 980. According to the legend, the town of Turaŭ was founded around 950 (first mentioned in 980) by Varangian Prince Tur, a brother of Rogvolod (the first chronicled prince of Polatsk).

=== Kiev Principality ===
During the time of Vladimir the Great (980 - 1015), the city of Turov and the immediate vicinity became part of Kievan Rus. Around 988, Vladimir appointed his eight-year-old son, Sviatopolk I of Kiev, to be knyaz of Turov. Later, Vladimir jailed Sviatopolk for plotting to rebel. Shortly before Vladimir died, Sviatopolk was freed and, upon Vladimir's death, seized the mantle of Grand Prince of Rus.

=== Izyaslavichi ===
In a series of three battles during 1016-1018, Yaroslav the Wise overthrew his older brother, Svyatopolk, and became Grand Prince of Kievan Rus. About 1042 or 1043, Yaroslav married his eldest son, Izyaslav, to the sister of King Casimir I of Poland and appointed Izyaslav to be knyaz of Turov and Pinsk. In 1054, Izyaslav became Grand Prince of Rus, with a volatile reign.

In 1078 after Izyaslav's death, Izyaslav's brother and new Grand Prince, Vsevolod, appointed Izyaslav's eldest son, Yaropolk Izyaslavich, to be knyaz of both Volhynia and Turov. In 1084, the Rostislavichi, rulers of neighboring Galicia (Halychyna), attempted to seize part of Yaropolk's realm, but Yaropolk and Vsevolod's son, Vladimir Monomakh, defeated the invaders. Yaropolk revolted briefly against Grand Prince Vsevolod, was reinstated, and was murdered in 1087 (likely by the Rostislavichi).

=== Opposition to Vladimir Monomakh ===
The Turov principality was passed to his younger brother Sviatopolk II, who administered the land of Novgorod. When Svyatopolk became the Grand Prince of Rus, he passed the principality of Turov to his nephew and son of Yaropolk Vyacheslav. Later Svyatopolk gave Volodymyr-Volynskyi and Brest to his sons Yaroslav and Mstislav respectively. As the Grand Prince Svyatopolk also tried to conquer the rebellious Rostislavichi, who had established themselves well in the land of Halych. However, his attempts were rather unsuccessful. In 1100 the principality of Turov was passed to Yaroslav Svyatopolkovich who ruled both the lands of Turov and Volhynia. During another conflict between the prince of Turov and the Grand Prince of Rus Yaroslav was eliminated from his realm in 1118. The land of Turov was then passed to another son of Svyatopolk Bryachislav, while Volhynia was given to one of the sons of Vladimir Monomakh Roman.

The 1097 Council of Liubech modified the rota system such that the Principality became a patrimonial land.

=== Reinstatement ===
After the death of Bryachislav Vladimir, Monomakh gave the Turov principality to his Vyacheslav who kept it until the middle of the 12th century. Around the 1150s Turov belonged to the descendants of Yuri Dolgoruki Andrei and Boris. Finally in 1162 the principality was passed by Yuri Dolgoruki back to one of the Izyaslavichi Yury Yaroslavich, grandson of Svyatopolk II of Kiev, who gained full independence from Kievan Rus'. However, at the same time the Principality became more and more divided between several sons of the duke Yury. A semi-independent Principality of Pinsk was created. Along with the Principality of Smolensk, the army of Turau participated in the Battle of the Kalka River in 1223.

=== Decline ===
The Principality of Turaŭ (23.) in 1385. The Principality of Pinsk (22.) in 1385.

In the early 13th century the Principality of Turov became dependent of the Kingdom of Galicia–Volhynia. To liberate itself from it, the dukes of Turov cooperated more and more with the Grand Duchy of Lithuania. In the early 14th century the Principality non-violently joined the Grand Duchy. By that time Hleb Narymunt, the son of Gediminas, was already ruler of Pinsk, while Turov and Haradok were still ruled by Rurikids. Later the territory of the Principality became part of the Brest Litovsk, Nowogródek, and Minsk Voivodeship.

== Regions of the Principality ==
- Principality of Turov (10th century - 14th century)
- Principality of Pinsk (12th century - 16th century)
- Principality of Kletsk (12th century - 15th century)
- Principality of Slutsk-Kopyl (12th century - 16th century)
- Principality of Dubrovytsia (12th century - 13th century)

== Princes ==
=== Prince of Turov ===
- Sviatopolk I Accursed (980-1019)

Izyalavichi

- Izyaslav I Yaroslavich (about 1045-1078)
- Yaropolk Petr Izyaslavich(1078–1087)
- Sviatopolk II Mikhail Izyaslavich (1087–1094)
- Vyacheslav Yaropolkovich (1094-1104/1105|5)

Monomakh (of Smolensk)

- Vyacheslav Monomakhovich (1125–1132)
- Izyaslav II Monomakhovich (1133–1134)
- Vyacheslav Monomakhovich (1134–1141)
- Vyacheslav Monomakhovich (1142–1146)
- ?

Dolgoruky

- Andrei I Yuryevich (1150–1151)
- ?
- Borys I (1155–1157)

Yuryevichi (Izyaslavichi's branch)

- Yuri Yaroslavovich (1157–1167)
- Ivan Yuryevich (1167–1190)
- Gleb (1190–1195)
- Ivan Yuryevich (1195–1207)
- Rostislav Glebovich (1207–1228)
- ?
- Yuri Volodymyrovich (?-1292)
- Dmitry Yuryevich (1292-)
- Danila Dmitrovich (?-before 1366)

=== Prince of Pinsk ===
Yuryevichi (Izyaslavichi's branch)

- Yaroslav Yurievich (-1184-)
- Volodimir Glebovich (-1228-)
- Rostislav Volodimirovich (-1242-)
- Fiodor Volodimirovich (-1262-)
- Yuri Volodimirovich (-1292)
- Demid Volodimirovich (1292-to 1292)
- Yaroslav Yurievich (to 1292-)
- Yuri Dimitrovich
- Gediminas (1320- ?)
- Narymunt Gleb (1340–1348)
- Mikhail Glebovich Narymuntovich (1348-?)
- Vasili Mikhailovich Narymuntovich (14th century)
- Yuri Nos Vasilievich Narymuntovich (before 1398- after 1410)
- Yuri Semenovich (before 1440-after 1471)
- Maria Olelkovich (1471–1501)
- Vasili Olelkovich (1480–1495)
- Fiodor Ivanovich Yaroslavich (1501–1521)

=== Prince of Kletsk ===
Yuryevichi (Izyaslavichi's branch)

- Wiaczesław Jarosławicz (1127- ?)
- ?
- Michał Zygmuntowicz (1442–1452)

=== Prince of Slutsk-Kopyl ===
- Yaroslav Iziaslavovich ? (1148)
- Sviatoslav Olegovich (1148–1162
- Volodimir Mstislavovich (1162–1164) ?
- ?
- Volodimir Olgierdovich (1395–1398)
- Aleksandr Olelko (1398–1454)
- Michail Olelkovich (1454-1470/1481)
- Simeon I Olelkovich (1481–1505)
- Yuri I Olelkovich (1505–1542)
- Simeon II Olelkovich (1542–1560)
- Yuri II Olelkovich (1560–1572)
- Yuri III Olelkovich (1572–1586)

=== Prince of Dubrovytsia ===
- Ivan Yurievich (1166–1182) ?
- Gleb Yurievich (1182–1190)
- Aleksandr Glebovich (1190–1223)

== Bibliography ==
- Ermolovich M.I., Ancient Belarus - Polotsk and Novogrudskii period, 1990 (Ермаловіч М. І. Старажытная Беларусь. Полацкі і Навагародскі перыяд. Мн., 1990.) (in Belarusian)
- Saganovich G., Outline of the History of Belarus from antiquity to the end of 18th century (Сагановіч Г. Нарыс гісторыі Беларусі ад старажытнасці да канца XVIII ст. Мн., 2001.) (in Belarusian)
- Hrushevsky, M. "History of Ukraine-Rus". Vol.2 Ch.4 (page 5) (in Ukrainian)
