= Gleb Vseslavich =

Prince of Minsk from 1101 to 1119

Gleb
- Prince of Minsk
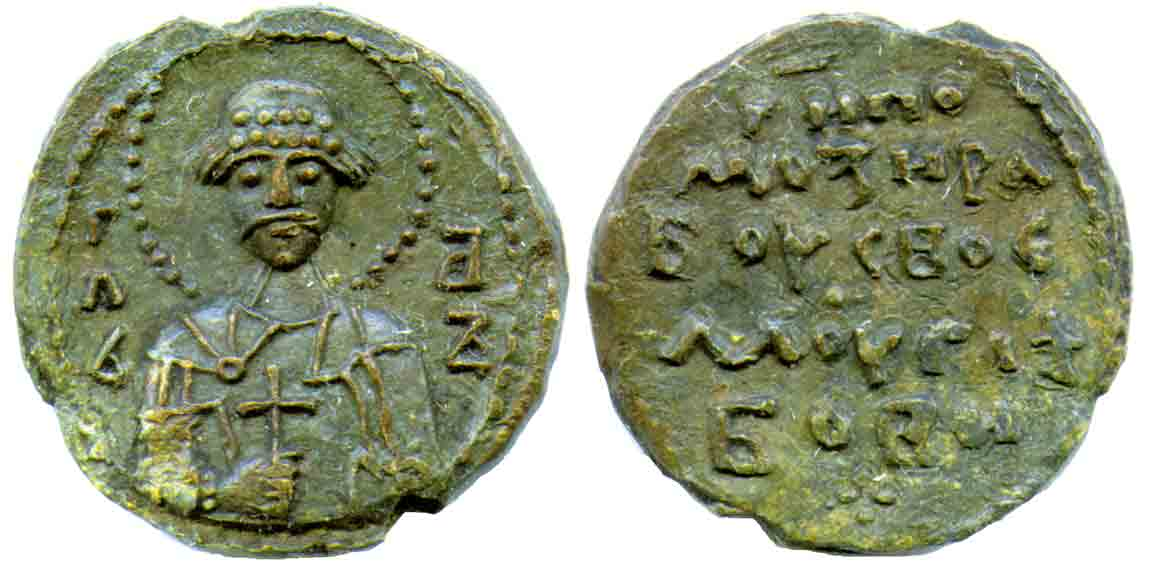
- Seal of Gleb Vseslavich
- Reign: 1101–1119
- Predecessor: Monarchy established
- Died: September 13, 1119; Kiev
- Spouse: Princess Yaropolkovna of Minsk
- Issue: Iziaslav; Rostislav; Volodar; Vsevolod
- House: Rurik
- Father: Vseslav the Seer

Gleb Vseslavich (Note: Belarusian: Глеб Усяславіч; Russian: Глеб Всеславич.) (died September 13, 1119) was the prince of Minsk between 1101 and 1119. During his reign, Minsk was at war with Kiev and Polotsk. He was the son of Vseslav of Polotsk and founded the Minsk branch of Rurikids.

== Reign ==
In 1104, his city of Minsk was under siege from the voivode Putiata, Oleg Sviatoslavich, and Yaropolk Vladimirovich, the son of Vladimir II Monomakh. In 1106, he had partaken the raid on the Baltic tribe of Semigallians.

In 1116, he started the war with Monomakh and burned down Slutsk. In response to that, Monomakh with his sons, Davyd Sviatoslavich, and sons of Oleg Sviatoslavich assaulted Minsk. The Monomakhs took Orsha, Drutsk, and took Minsk under siege. Gleb started negotiations with Vladimir who in spirit of the upcoming Easter holidays agreed to conclude a peace. Completely ignoring the conditions of the signed peace treaty, Gleb resumed his hostilities in 1119. The same year, Mstislav Vladimirovich, the son of Monomakh, took Gleb as a prisoner to Kiev where the last one died shortly.

== Family ==
- Wife: since c. 1090 Princess Yaropolkovna of Minsk (died 1158), a daughter of Yaropolk Iziaslavovich
- Sons:
1. Rostislav (died 1165), Prince of Minsk 1146–1165 and Prince of Polotsk 1151–1159
2. Volodar (died 1167+), Prince of Gorodets 1146–1167, Prince of Minsk 1151–1159, 1165–1167, and Prince of Polotsk 1167
3. Vsevolod (died 1159/1162), Prince of Iziaslav 1151–1159, Prince of Strezhev 1159–1162
4. Iziaslav (died 1134)

== Bibliography ==
- Alekseyev L. V. — Polotsk Land // Medieval Russian Principality 10th—13th centuries — published 1975

Gleb Vseslavich Rurikovich Born: ? Died: 1119
Regnal titles
Preceded by established	Prince of Minsk; 1101–1119	Succeeded by Rostislav Glebovich
Titles in pretence
Preceded by Rogvolod Vseslavich	2nd in line to Grand Prince of Kiev; 1093–1119	Succeeded by Davyd Vseslavich
