= Aryeh Leib Shifman =

Rabbi Aryeh Leib Shifman (haRav Aryeh Leib ben Moshe Ber Shifman; October 24, 1891 in Turaw, Belarus – November 19, 1937 in Smolensk, Russia) was a Rabbi and a student of the Chofetz Chaim. After studying in the Radun Yeshiva for 18 years under the Chofetz Chaim, Rabbi Aryeh Leib was granted Semicha and appointed the Rabbi of Grozovo, Belarus. Later that year, he was appointed Rabbi of Maryina Gorka and Pukhovichi, Belarus. As a result of Soviet anti-religious and antisemitic persecutions, Rabbi Aryeh Leib was jailed in 1933.

As a result of this further persecution, Aryeh Leib and his family was ordered to evacuate Pukhovichi, due its proximity to the Soviet–Polish border, within 24 hours. He was officially hired as the bookkeeper of the Smolensk Synagogue, but covertly fulfilled the responsibilities of a communal rabbi as well. On October 17, 1937, the NKVD arrested Rabbi Aryeh Leib. After a lengthy interrogation, they presented him with two options: either to become a secret informant or to become a political prisoner. He was given a day to consider his decision. He returned the following day, adamantly refusing the former and was arrested as a political prisoner.

When he was arrested, his library of religious books and his own manuscripts of religious writings were taken by the Soviets. Some of it was immediately destroyed and the rest placed in Soviet archives. He was convicted by a Troika on falsified charges, ranging from counter-revolutionary activities to Trotskyism, on November 12, 1937 and was sentenced to death by firing squad. Despite extended and intense torture, he never confessed to any of the charges made against him. Despite the opportunity to become an informant and avert his fate, he never compromised his principles. His death sentence was carried out in the basement of the NKVD prison in Smolensk on November 19, 1937.
