= Rogvolod Vseslavich =

Rogvolod-Boris Vseslavich
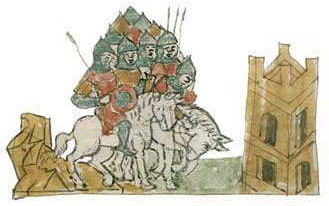
- Miniature from the Radziwiłł Chronicle: Rogvolod-Boris rides to rule in Polotsk

Prince of Drutsk Prince of Polotsk
- Reign: 1101–1128
- Successor: Rogvolod-Vasiliy
- Died: 1128; Polotsk
- Spouse: ?
- Issue: Rogvolod-Vasiliy; Ivan; Zvenislava
Names
- Rogvolod-Boris Vseslavich
- House: Rurik Dynasty
- Father: Vseslav Briachislavich
- Mother: ?

Rogvolod Vseslavich, baptismal name Boris, was the Prince of Drutsk and Polotsk. He was the son of Vseslav of Polotsk, Grand Prince of Rus. Rogvolod probably was named in honor of his ancestor Rogvolod.

Some historians, including Mikhail Pogodin, believe that Rogvolod-Boris are two different princes. It is also not clear whether or not Rogvolod was the older brother of Davyd and Gleb. However, if he was given the Principality of Drutsk it, probably, corresponds to the line of succession which presumably made him second in that line.

It also possible that he was the Prince of Polotsk right after his father's death, but that account is rebutted by another fact which is supported by some Slavic chronicles that call Davyd Vseslavich as the leader of the Polotsk armed forces and possibly the main successor of the Polotsk throne. According to Vasily Tatishchev, Rogvolod has found the city of Barysaw in 1102, hence are the main speculation him being also called Boris. In 1106, he possibly participated in the united campaign of Polotsk Principality against the Semigallians, which ended in defeat. Sometime in 1120, Rogvolod founded a princely residence near Polotsk in Belchitsy.

== Sources ==
- "Рогволод Всеславич" . Brockhaus and Efron Encyclopedic Dictionary (in Russian). 1906.

Rogvolod-Boris Vseslavich Rurikovich Born: ? Died: 1128
Regnal titles
Preceded by established	Prince of Drutsk; 1101–1128	Succeeded by Rogvolod-Vasiliy
Titles in pretence
Preceded by Sviatopolk II	Grand Prince of Kiev; 1093–1128	Succeeded by Davyd Vseslavich
Preceded by Sviatopolk II	2nd in line to Grand Prince of Kiev; 1087–1093	Succeeded by Gleb Vseslavich
