= Principality of Drutsk =

European polity

Coordinates: 54°20′N 29°45′E

Principality of Drutsk Князство Друцкое (Sla)
- Appanage principality of Polotsk Principality
- 1101–1565
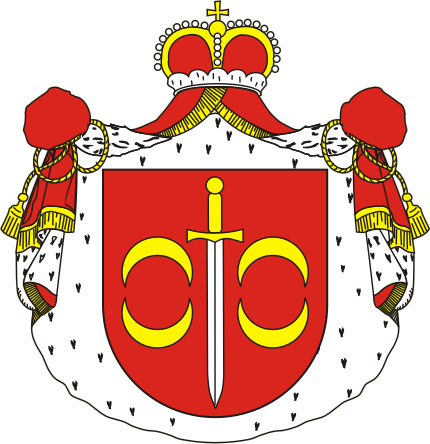
- Coat of arms

- The Principality of Drutsk (8.) in 1385.
- Capital: Drutsk
- Government
  - Type: Feudal monarchy
- History
  - Established: 1101
  - Disestablished: 1565
Succeeded by
Grand Duchy of Lithuania
- Today part of: Belarus

The Principality of Drutsk (Belarusian: Княства Друцкае; obsolete spelling: Druck) was a small appanage of the Principality of Polotsk, centred in the city of Drutsk. It was located on a three way stick between Vitebsk, Minsk and Mogilev regions in modern Belarus.

The appanage principality of Drutsk was established after the death of Vseslav, the Prince of Polotsk, in 1101 and the division of the Polatsk territory between Vseslav's sons. Drutsk was given to Rogvolod-Boris. Soon its territory was taken over by another appanage duchy of Polotsk, Principality of Minsk governed by Gleb Vseslavich. In 1116, the Principality of Drutsk was taken over by the Grand Principality of Kiev governed by Volodymyr Monomakh, but by 1150s it was returned to Principality of Minsk. Eventually Drutsk was entirely taken over by the Principality of Minsk in the second half of the 13th century and in early 14th century by another appanage duchy of Polotsk, Principality of Vitebsk.

It is believed that Algirdas, Grand Duke of Lithuania, acquired the Principality by marriage to Maria of Vitebsk. The principality became part of the Grand Duchy of Lithuania where it existed as an autonomous principality until an administrative reform in 1565–1566, when it was included into the Orsha county of Vitebsk Voivodeship.

== Princes of Drutsk ==
- 1151–1158: Gleb of Drutsk, son of prince Rostislav of Minsk
- 1101–1119: Boris I of Polotzk, son of grand-prince Vseslav of Kiev
- 1140–1146: Rogvolod II of Polotzk, son of Boris I
- 1146–1151: Gleb of Drutsk, son of Rogvolod II
- from 1163: Gleb of Drutsk, son of Rogvolod II
- 1161–1171: Rogvolod II of Polotzk (again)
- until 1196: Boris of Drutsk, son of Gleb
- about 1217: Vojtech of Drutsk, son of prince Boris II of Polotzk

== See also ==
- Bibliography of Russian history
