= Yaropolk Iziaslavich =

Prince of Turov and Volhynia (r. 1078–1086/1087)

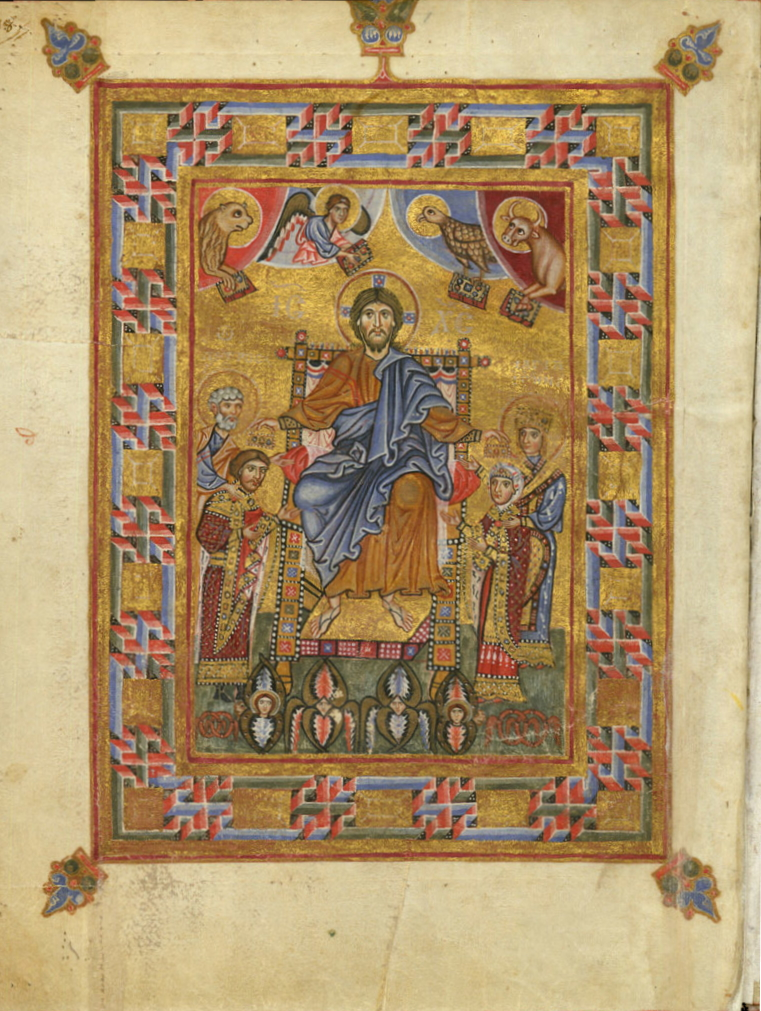
- Christ crowning Yaropolk and his mother Gertruda, 11th-century miniature from the Gertrude Psalter

Prince of Volhynia
- Reign: 1078–1086/1087
- Predecessor: Oleg Svyatoslavich
- Successor: Davyd Igorevich

Prince of Turov
- Reign: 1078–1086/1087
- Predecessor: Iziaslav Yaroslavich
- Successor: Sviatopolk Iziaslavich
- Died: 1086/1087
- Spouse: Kunigunde, daughter of Otto I, Margrave of Meissen
- Issue: Princess Yaropolkovna of Minsk a daughter Yaroslav; Viacheslav; Vasilko
Names
- Yaropolk Iziaslavich (Peter)
- House: Rurik
- Father: Iziaslav I of Kiev
- Mother: Gertrude of Poland

Saint Yaropolk Iziaslavich
- Died: 22 November 1086/1087
- Venerated in: Eastern Orthodox Church
- Feast: 22 November

Yaropolk Iziaslavich (Note: Also romanized as Iaropolk Iziaslavich or Yaropolk Iziaslavych.) (died 22 November 1086/1087) (Note: 1086 according to the Laurentian Codex, and 1087 according to the Hypatian Codex.) was Prince of Turov and Prince of Volhynia from 1078 until his death.

The son of Grand Prince Iziaslav I of Kiev by a Polish princess named Gertruda, he is visible in papal sources by the early 1070s, but largely absent in contemporary domestic sources until his father's death in 1078. During his father's exile in the 1070s, Yaropolk can be found acting on his father's behalf in an attempt to gain the favor of the German emperors and the papal court of Pope Gregory VII. His father returned to Kiev in 1077 and Yaropolk followed.

After his father's death, Yaropolk was appointed as prince of Volhynia and prince of Turov in 1078 by the new grand prince, his uncle Vsevolod. By 1085, Yaropolk had fallen into a state of enmity with the grand prince, and by extension the grand prince's son Vladimir II Monomakh, forcing him to flee to Poland, his mother's homeland. He returned in 1086 and made peace with Monomakh, but was later murdered on a journey to Zvenigorod.

== Early life and family ==
Yaropolk was the son of Iziaslav I of Kiev (d. 1078), and Gertruda, daughter of the Polish monarch Mieszko II Lambert (died 1034). Since the Kievan succession war of 1015–1019, the Polish ruler Bolesław had taken an interest in Kievan Rus', hoping to gain control of the land of Red Ruthenia (Czerwien Grody), seized by Vladimir the Great.

Despite some initial success, the expedition of Bolesław to Kiev in 1018 failed to establish Sviatopolk Vladimirovich (Bolesław's son-in-law), the prince of Turov, on the Kievan throne. The Polish ruler did at least gain the Red Ruthenia very briefly, though that was recovered for Kievan Rus' by Yaroslav and Mstislav Vladimirovich, the prince of Chernigov, in 1031.

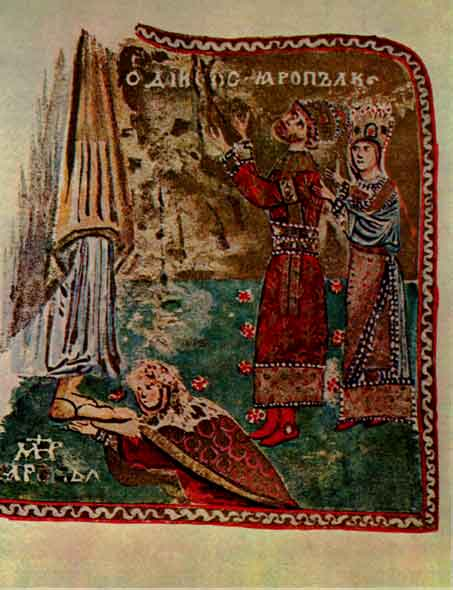
Illumination in the Gertrude Psalter depicting Yaropolk and his wife before the Apostle Peter, with Yaropolk's mother Gertruda at the Apostle's feet.

In 1042, Yaroslav forced Casimir of Poland to settle for a peaceful deal. Casimir recognised Ruthenian control of Red Ruthenia and returned 800 Ruthenian prisoners who had been in Polish custody since being captured two decades before by Bolesław. Peace was secured by two marriages. Casimir was married to Yaroslav's sister, while Casimir gave his own sister Gertruda to Yaroslav's son, Iziaslav.

== Political turmoil ==
In 1054, Yaropolk became the son of the grand prince, as in that year Iziaslav ascended the throne of Kiev. Iziaslav's rule and thus Yaropolk's security were however quickly challenged by Iziaslav's brother Sviatoslav and by his cousin Vseslav Briacheslavich. At this time among the Rurikids, there were two senior branches that could claim the grand princeship through descent from Vladimir the Great; namely, the descendants of Yaroslav Vladimirovich and the descendants of Iziaslav Vladimirovich.

In 1067, Vseslav rebelled in an attempt to overthrow Iziaslav and become the grand prince himself, claiming the right as a great-grandson of Vladimir the Great through Iziaslav Vladimirovich. Vseslav's attempt was unsuccessful, and ended in his imprisonment. Troubles for Iziaslav were to continue though. In 1068, Iziaslav's alleged negligence to the advances and incursions of the Cuman people (Polovtsy) after the defeat at the Battle of the Alta River led the citizens of Kiev to revolt; Vseslav was released, and took the Kievan throne while Iziaslav fled to Bolesław in Poland. With Polish assistance, Iziaslav returned in May 1069, expelled Vseslav and retook the throne. This victory for Iziaslav secured the Kievan throne for the descendants of Yaroslav Vladimirovich, and thereafter the descendants of Iziaslav Vladimirovich confined themselves to Polotsk where they reigned with semi-independent status.

== Sviatoslav and exile to the west ==
Despite the successful exclusion of the Polotsk Rurikids, in 1073, Iziaslav was expelled from the Kievan throne by his brothers, Sviatoslav, the prince of Chernigov, and Vsevolod, the prince of Pereyaslavl. Bolesław was not as willing or able to assist Iziaslav this time around, and probably for this reason Iziaslav traveled further West; at Mainz in early 1075, Iziaslav sought the aid of Henry IV of Germany, but to no avail.

Iziaslav sent Yaropolk to Rome to request aid from Pope Gregory VII. It is likely that while there Yaropolk made complaints about Bolesław and about the money the latter had formerly seized from Iziaslav, as the pope subsequently issued a request that Bolesław return it. Pope Gregory addressed a letter to Iziaslav, called "Demetrius", "King of the Russians", and to his "queen" Gertruda. The letter noted that Yaropolk, called "Peter", had given his own as well as his father's fidelity to the pope, and that it had been requested that the "kingdom of the Ruthenians" be held of St Peter. Two papal legates were sent to Iziaslav, and Iziaslav was urged to give them his full co-operation.

It was only after Svyatoslav's death in late 1076 that Iziaslav was able to recover the status of grand prince. Vsevolod, who had previously fought against him, was appointed Prince of Chernigov and thus heir to the Kievan throne, explaining perhaps Vsevolod's lack of opposition. The Poles were persuaded by the papacy to give Iziaslav assistance recovering his kingdom, and on 15 July 1077, Iziaslav re-entered Kiev.

== Prince Yaropolk ==
Yaropolk is found aiding his father and his uncle Vsevolod in 1078, when Oleg Sviatoslavich (and his brother Boris) attempted to gain the throne of Chernigov from Vsevolod. Oleg had been allied to the Polovtsy, and with their help defeated Vsevolod in battle. Grand Prince Iziaslav and Yaropolk, as well as Vsevolod's son Vladimir Monomakh, were able to reverse this result, and Oleg was forced to retreat to Tmutorokan. Grand Prince Iziaslav, Yaropolk's father, died as a result of the battle.

The Primary Chronicle records that in 1078, before the death of Iziaslav, Yaropolk was "ruling in Vyshgorod", a city north of Kiev, while his brother Sviatopolk ruled as the prince of Novgorod, and Vladimir Monomakh ruled as the prince of Smolensk. After his uncle Vsevolod had become the grand prince, Yaropolk was given Vladimir-in-Volhynia and Turov, while Monomakh received Chernigov.

Little is known for the following eight years, but by 1085, Vsevolod and Yaropolk are reported to have become entrenched against each other. The laconic account of these developments in the Primary Chronicle makes the course of events far from transparent. Vasilko and Vladimir Rostislavich, two Galicia-based princes unhappy with territorial settlement under Vsevolod, were said to have attempted to expel Yaropolk in 1084, but Grand Prince Vsevolod's son Vladimir Monomakh drove these Rostislavchi away.

Following this, a gift made by the grand prince to Davyd Igorevich, which included land in Volhynia and control of trade with the Byzantine Empire, is said to have made Yaropolk hostile to the Grand Prince. By 1085, Vsevolod and Yaropolk are reported to have become entrenched against each other, and Vsevolod ordered his son, Vladimir Monomakh to march against Yaropolk. Lacking confidence in his own resources, Yaropolk fled Volhynia to Poland, leaving his followers (and mother) at Lutsk. Vladimir captured Lutsk and Yaropolk's family, attendants and treasure, and assigned his whole principality to Davyd Igorevich.

== Death and legacy ==
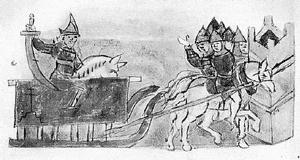
Miniature from the Radzivil Chronicle allegedly depicting the death of Yaropolk.

In the following year, Yaropolk returned and reportedly came to an agreement with Vladimir Monomakh, but nothing specific is known of the terms other than Yaropolk being reinstated. Yaropolk was murdered, and the circumstances of his murder are not clear, but the Primary Chronicle suggested the complicity of Rurik Rostislavich, the prince of Peremyshl, and his brother Vasilko Rostislavich, the prince of Terebovl. His murderer was a man called Neradets, who put a sword through Yaropolk before fleeing to hide with Rurik in Peremyshl; the date given is 22 November. He died in 1086 or 1087. His body was taken to Kiev and buried in the church of Saint Peter on 5 December, the church which Yaropolk himself had endowed.

Yaropolk is said to have married to the German noblewoman, Kunigunde, daughter of Otto, Margrave of Meissen. Whether by Kunigunde or not, Yaropolk had several children whose names have come into the record. A daughter, Princess Yaropolkovna of Minsk, married her far relative Gleb Vseslavich, the prince of Minsk who was a member of the Polotsk branch of the Rurikid family. The Annalista Saxo records another daughter, and that she married Günther, Count of Schwarzburg, though it does not mention her name. Three sons are known, namely, Yaroslav (d. 1102–1103), and Viacheslav (d. 1104). The fate of his descendants is as mysterious as his and only has some scarce records left.

Embedded in the Primary Chronicle is a eulogy to Yaropolk, and among the honors assigned to him, is that he was in the habit of assigning a "tenth part of his wealth to the Mother of God". Probably due to his personal devotion to the papacy and to St Peter, Yaropolk established a new church of St Peter at the monastery of St Demetrios in the city of Kiev. He was said to have left all his wealth to the Monastery of the Caves in Kiev. The Primary Chronicle's eulogy is the first indication of saintly regard, and indeed today he is venerated as a saint in the Eastern Orthodox Church, with his feast day falling on the reported day of his death, 22 November.

== Ancestry ==
Ancestors of Yaropolk Iziaslavich

8. Vladimir the Great
4. Yaroslav I the Wise
9. Rogneda of Polotsk
2. Iziaslav I of Kiev
10. Olof Skötkonung
5. Ingegerd Olofsdotter of Sweden
11. Estrid of the Obotrites
1. Yaropolk Iziaslavich
12. Bolesław I Chrobry
6. Mieszko II Lambert
13. Emnilda of Lusatia
3. Gertrude of Poland
14. Ezzo of Lotharingia
7. Richeza of Lotharingia
15. Matilda of Germany

== Family ==
Wife – Kunigunde, daughter of Otto I

1. Princess Yaropolkovna of Minsk (daughter), married Gleb Vseslavich (Prince of Minsk)
  1. Volodar
  2. Rostislav
2. Mechtild (daughter), married Günther I (House of Schwarzburg)
  1. Sizzo III
3. Yaroslav (son) (?–1102)
4. Viacheslav (son) (?–1104)
5. Vasilko (son)

== Bibliography ==
- Bartlett, Robert (1993), The Making of Europe: Conquest, Colonization and Cultural Change, 950–1350, London: Penguin Books, ISBN 978-0140154092
- Cowdrey, H. E. J. (1998), Pope Gregory VII, 1073–1085, Oxford: Oxford University Press, ISBN 0-19-820646-1
- Curtin, Jeremiah (1908), "Chapter 1: Early History of Russia", The Mongols in Russia, Little, Brown and Company, Boston, p. 31, ISBN 978-1-4400-4917-0
- Dmytryshyn, Basil, ed. (1991), Medieval Russia: A Source Book, 850–1700 (3rd ed.), Fort Worth: Harcourt Brace Jovanovich, ISBN 0-03-033422-5
- Franklin, Simon; Shepard, Jonathan (1996), The Emergence of Rus, 750–1200, Longman History of Russia, London & New York: Longman, ISBN 0-582-49091-X
- Martin, Janet (1995), Medieval Russia, 970–1584, Cambridge Medieval Textbooks, Cambridge: Cambridge University Press, ISBN 0-521-36832-4

Yaropolk Iziaslavich Rurik Died: 1087
Regnal titles
Preceded by Iziaslav Yaroslavich	Prince of Turov; 1078–1087	Succeeded by Svyatopolk Iziaslavich
Preceded by Oleg Svyatoslavich	Prince of Volhynia; 1078–1087	Succeeded by Davyd Igorevich
