= Rostislav Glebovich =

Rostislav
- Prince of Minsk
- Reign: 1146–1165
- Predecessor: ?
- Successor: ?
- Born: ?
- Died: 1165
- House: Riurik Dynasty
- Father: Gleb Vseslavich
- Mother: ?

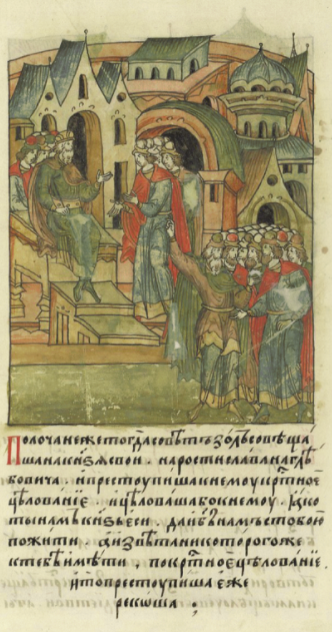
Rostislav Glebovich depicted in a 1568 anonymous manuscript illustration

Rostislav Glebovich (Russian: Ростислав Глебович) (died 1165) was the prince of Minsk between 1146 and 1165, and was the son of Gleb Vseslavich. Rostislav's son, Gleb Rostislavich, was the Prince of Drutsk. In 1159, Gleb was expelled from Drutsk and fled to his father, and later that same year they together started a campaign to recapture Drutsk.

== References and sources ==
Rostislav Glebovich Rurikovich Born: ? Died: 1165
Regnal titles
Preceded by Unknown; eventually Gleb Vseslavich	Prince of Minsk; 1146–1165	Succeeded by ?
