= Agnes Hohenstaufen =

- Died: 1151
- Spouse: Iziaslav II of Kiev
- Issue: Mstislav II of Kiev; Yaroslav II of Kiev
- Father: Conrad III of Germany
- Mother: Gertrude of Comburg

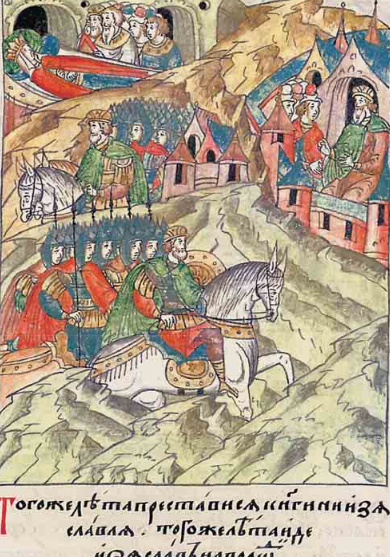
Death of Agnes of Germany

Agnes Hohenstaufen (Ukrainian: Агнеса Гогенштауфен) (?-1151), was a Grand Princess of the Kiev by marriage to Iziaslav II of Kiev, Grand Prince of Kiev (r. 1146–1149 and 1151–1154).

== Issue ==
1. Mstislav II of Kiev
2. Yaroslav II of Kiev
3. Yaropolk, Prince of Shumsk
  1. Vasylko (1151–1182), prince of Shumsk
