= Volodar Glebovich, Prince of Minsk =

Prince of Minsk (c. 1090 – 1176)

Volodar Glebovich of Minsk was a prince of Minsk, belonging to the Vseslavichi clan of the principality of Polotsk from where it originated. He was the son of Gleb Vseslavich of Minsk (death 1119) and Princess Yaropolkovna of Minsk. The first time he is mentioned as prince of Minsk in the Kievan Chronicle is in 1159, one year after a long obituary to his mother, indicative that she reigned as princess of Minsk between her husband Gleb's death in 1119 and her son Volodar's mention as prince in 1159.

Volodar died after 1167, possibly 1176.

== Biography ==
Volodar's family had long been in conflict with the Grand Prince of Kiev, Vladimir Monomach, who in 1113 (according to some information 1119) conquered Minsk from Volodar's father. Later, the remaining possessions of the Polotsk dynasty had been conquered by Vladimir's son Mstislav I of Kiev and its members were forced into exile to, inter alia, Constantinople. However, after Mstislav's death in 1132, Kievan Rus' experienced some turmoil, enabling the Polotsk dynasty to make a political comeback beyond its patrimony.

Volodar was married June 5, 1135 (probably while in exile in Poland) to Richeza of Poland, Queen of Sweden, daughter of Bolesław III Wrymouth and widow of the Danish prince Magnus Nielsen, who the year before fell in the Battle of Fotevik. Volodar and Richeza had the daughter Sofia of Minsk, who later married Valdemar the Great of Denmark.

The marriage of Volodar and Richeza was a political move by her father directed against the then alliance between Erik Emune of Denmark and the descendants of Monomach. Since several central actors in this conflict died and the position of the Monomies in Russia greatly weakened, the foundation of the marriage also fell, which was dissolved in divorce, after which Richeza married Sverker I of Sweden.

The Kievan Chronicle states that Vseslav Glebovich, with Lithuanian help, defeated Rogvolod-Vasily of Polotsk in 1162, either near Minsk or "Garadzets". Sub anno 1167, it states that Volodar defeated Vseslav Vasilkovich near Polotsk, but when Volodar's army advanced to Vitebsk, it had to retreat due to a storm.

== Misconception ==
In ancient history research, Volodar was usually confused (among others by Nikolaj von Baumgarten) with the half-mythical prince Vladimir Vsevolodich of Novgorod.

== Bibliography ==
=== Primary sources ===
- Kievan Chronicle (c. 1200), sub anno 6682 (1174) [1173]
  - (Church Slavonic critical edition) Shakhmatov, Aleksey Aleksandrovich, ed. (1908). Ipat'evskaya letopis' Ипатьевская лѣтопись [The Hypatian Codex]. Complete Collection of Russian Chronicles (PSRL) (in Church Slavic). Vol. 2 (3rd ed.). Saint Petersburg: Typography of M. A. Aleksandrov / Izbornyk. pp. 285–301.
  - (modern English translation) Heinrich, Lisa Lynn (1977). The Kievan Chronicle: A Translation and Commentary (PhD diss.). Nashville, Tennessee: Vanderbilt University. p. 616. ProQuest 7812419
  - (modern Ukrainian translation) Makhnovets, Leonid (1989). Літопис Руський за Іпатським списком [Rus' Chronicle according to the Hypatian Codex] (in Ukrainian). Kyiv: Dnipro. p. 591. ISBN 5-308-00052-2. — A modern annotated Ukrainian translation of the Kievan Chronicle based on the Hypatian Codex with comments from the Khlebnikov Codex.

=== Literature ===
- Garcia de la Puente, Inés (2012). "Gleb of Minsk's Widow: Neglected Evidence on the Rule of a Woman in Rus'ian History?". Russian History. 39 (3). Brill Deutschland: 347–378. doi:10.1163/18763316-03903006. ISSN 0094-288X.
- John Lind "The Russian Marriages. Dynamic and Political Coalitions During the Danish Civil War of the 1130s" in (Danish) Historical Journal No. 2 1992.
