= Iziaslav I of Kiev =

Grand Prince of Kiev (r. 1054–1068; 1069–1073; 1077–1078)

Iziaslav I
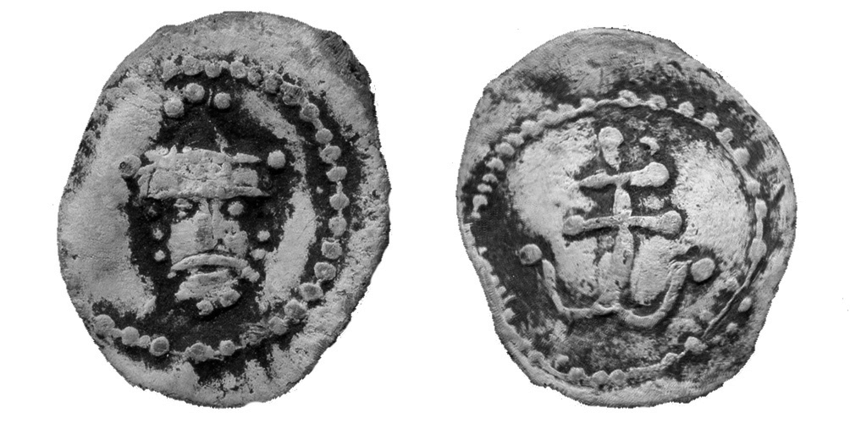
- Seal of Iziaslav I with his portrait

Grand Prince of Kiev
- Reign: 1054–1068
- Predecessor: Yaroslav the Wise
- Successor: Vseslav
- Reign: 1069–1073
- Predecessor: Vseslav
- Successor: Sviatoslav II
- Reign: 1077–1078
- Predecessor: Vsevolod I
- Successor: Vsevolod I

Prince of Novgorod
- Reign: 1052–1054
- Predecessor: Vladimir of Novgorod
- Successor: Mstislav I

Prince of Turov
- Reign: 1045–1052
- Born: 5 February 1024
- Died: 3 October 1078 (aged 54); Nezhatyna Nyva
- Burial: Church of the Tithes, Kiev
- Spouse: Gertrude of Poland, Casimir's sister
- Issue: Yaropolk Izyaslavich, Mstislav, Sviatopolk II
Names
- Iziaslav Yaroslavovich
- Dynasty: Rurik
- Father: Yaroslav the Wise
- Mother: Ingegerd Olofsdotter (a daughter of Olof Skötkonung)
- Religion: Eastern Orthodoxy
- Seal

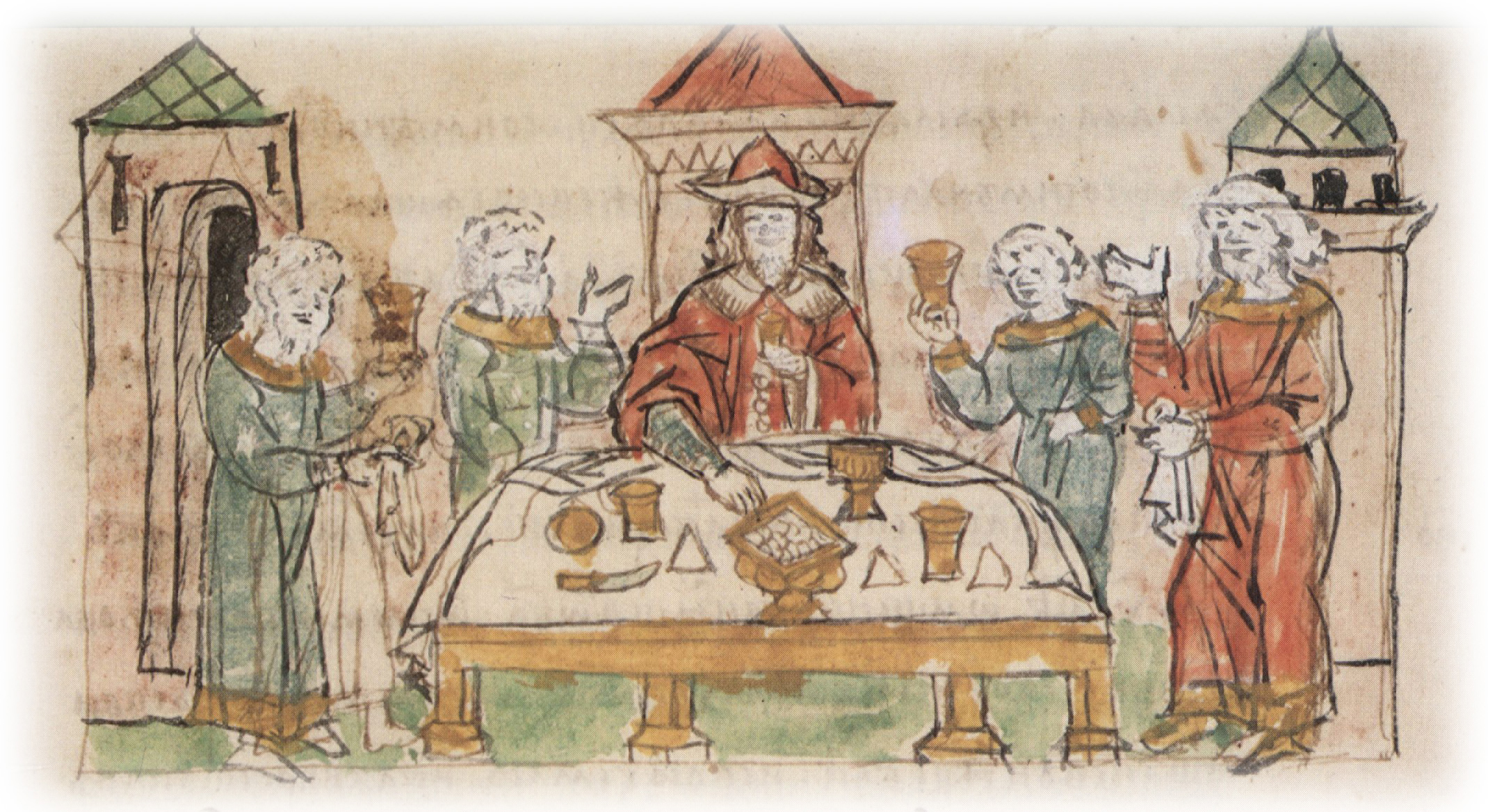
Iziaslav having a meal with his boyars, a miniature from Radziwill Chronicle

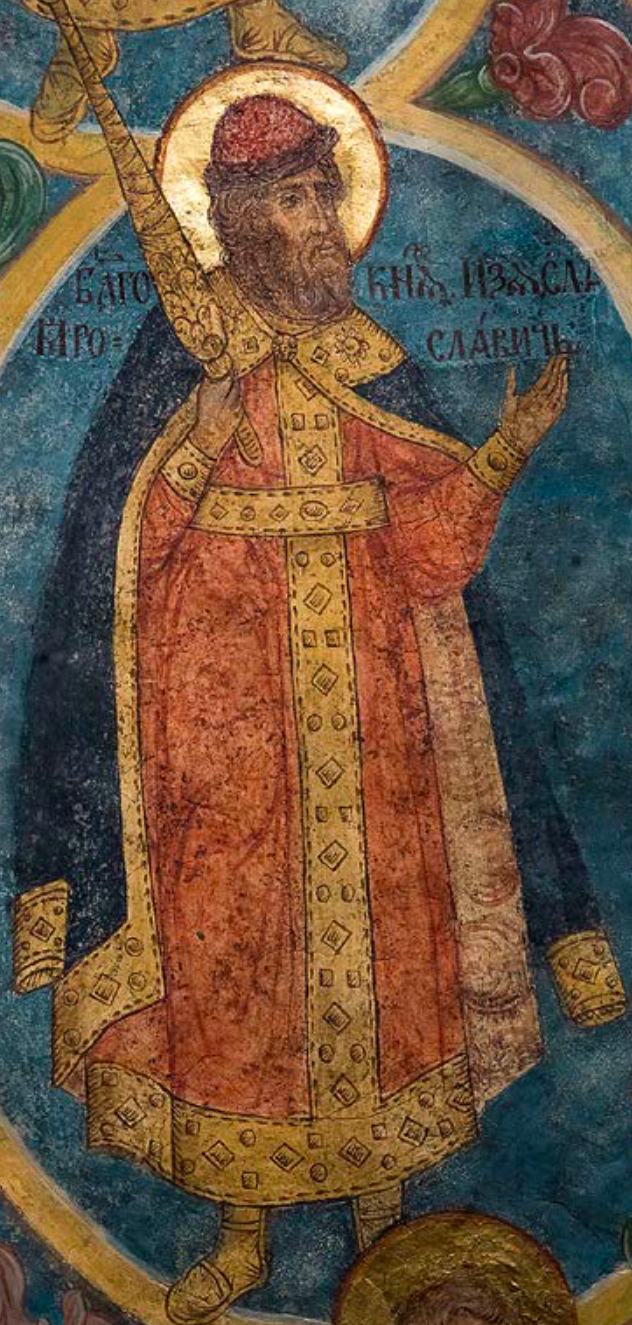
Portrait of Izyaslav I from Novospassky Monastery

Iziaslav I Yaroslavich (Old East Slavic: Изѧславь Ѩрославичь, romanized: Izęslavǐ Jęroslavičǐ; (Note: Russian: Изяслав Ярославич; Ukrainian: Ізяслав Ярославич) 1024 – 3 October 1078; baptized as Demetrius) was Prince of Turov and Grand Prince of Kiev (1054–1068; 1069–1073; 1077–1078).

Iziaslav's children Yaropolk and Sviatopolk would rule the Turov Principality. Their authority was mainly challenged by the descendents of Rostislav Vsevolodovich.

== Biography ==
Iziaslav was the oldest son of Yaroslav I the Wise by his second wife Ingigerd Olafsdottir. Iziaslav succeeded his father, after Yaroslav's oldest child, Vladimir (the only child by Yaroslav's first wife), had predeceased his father. Iziaslav was one of the authors of the Pravda of Yaroslav's Descendants – a part of the first legal code of the Russkaya Pravda.

He is also credited with the foundation of the Kiev Pechersk Monastery. Prince Iziaslav I of Kiev ceded the whole mountain to Antonite monks who founded a monastery built by architects from Constantinople. According to the Primary Chronicle, in the early 11th century, Antony, a Greek Orthodox monk from Esphigmenon monastery on Mount Athos, originally from Liubech in the Principality of Chernigov, returned to Rus' and settled in Kiev as a missionary of the monastic tradition to Kievan Rus'. He chose a cave at the Berestov Mount that overlooked the Dnieper River and a community of disciples soon grew.

In 1043, his father Yaroslav made an agreement with King Casimir I of Poland that recognized Cherven as part of Kiev. The agreement was sealed with a double marriage: Casimir to Dobronega, Yaroslav's sister; and Iziaslav to Gertrude, Casimir's sister. From this marriage were born three children: Yaropolk, Mstislav and Sviatopolk. From 1045 to 1052, Iziaslav reigned as Prince of Turov.

=== First reign (1054–1068) ===
Upon the death of Yaroslav the Wise in 1054, his realm was divided between three of his older sons (Vladimir of Novgorod died before that), Iziaslav, Sviatoslav, and Vsevolod, creating the Yaroslavichi triumvirate that ruled the country for the next 20 years.

In 1060, the triumvirate campaigned together in the steppes against the Oghuz.

=== Rebellion of Vseslav of Polotsk (1065–1069) ===
In 1065, their cousin Vseslav, who was the prince of Polotsk, besieged Pskov, but was defeated. In the winter of 1066–1067, he also attacked Novgorod. The prince of Novgorod at the time was Iziaslav's son Mstislav, who fled for Kiev. In response, the triumvirate marched up to take out Vseslav. Their first stop was the town of Minsk, whose people reportedly shut themselves into the town. However, the triumvirate managed to take Minsk and met Vseslav at the Nemiga river. On 3 March 1067, the two armies faced off at the Battle on the Nemiga River. Ultimately, the triumvirate was victorious and Vseslav fled. On 10 June, there was a formal truce between the two parties and Iziaslav invited Vseslav to his camp, but it was a trap. Vseslav and his two sons were arrested and brought to Kiev.

In 1068, the Cumans defeated the triumvirate at the Alta river, which dangerously exposed some major cities, including Kiev. Sviatoslav went to Chernigov, while Iziaslav and Vsevolod went to Kiev. On September 15, a veche met in Kiev that encouraged Iziaslav to fight the invaders, but he refused to even negotiate. The Kievans decided that if he wasn't going to send them, maybe another prince would, and started a popular uprising against him. Part of that uprising was that they freed Vseslav from his captivity and acclaimed him as their new prince. Iziaslav fled to Poland to get aid from Boleslaw II and marched back to reclaim the city. However, Vseslav didn't want to rule Kiev, so he fled in the night, leaving the people of the city with no leader to face Iziaslav and his Polish allies. Sviatoslav and Vsevolod asked him to show restraint, so he sent his son Mstislav, former prince of Novgorod, to blind and kill the important people. Iziaslav was received back in Kiev by 2 May 1069.

=== Second reign (1069–1073) ===
His brother Sviatoslav had gained more power from the whole affair. He was the one who defeated the Cumans in autumn of the previous year and even captured their leader while Iziaslav was off in Poland. During that time, Sviatoslav even installed his own son, Gleb, as the new prince of Novgorod. Iziaslav's son Mstislav got Polotsk instead, though after his death in 1069 it went to his brother Sviatopolk. Unfortunately for Iziaslav, Sviatopolk was expelled from the city by Vseslav in 1071 who returned to ruling it, leaving Iziaslav's family with nothing to show for losing Novgorod.

In 1072, the triumvirate presided over the celebration of the sanctity of Boris and Gleb, which involved the transfer of their relics to a new church in Vyshgorod.

=== Exile in Poland (1073–1076) ===
By 1073, Iziaslav had alienated so many people that Sviatoslav and Vsevolod drove him out of Kiev on 22 March in a seemingly bloodless coup. He once again went to Poland, but this time Boleslaw took his bribes and didn't give him any aid. In January 1075, he showed up at the court of King Henry IV of Germany in Mainz to ask for help, but Henry didn't immediately provide aid, instead sending an emissary to Kiev for more information. At the same time, Iziaslav sent his son Yaropolk to Rome to ask for the support of Pope Gregory VII.

=== Third reign (1077–1078) ===
Luckily for Iziaslav, Sviatoslav died in 1076 and he was able to return to Kiev on 15 July 1077 to once again rule. A conflict broke out after Sviatoslav's death about the rightful succession to Chernigov. Iziaslav and Vsevolod drove out Sviatoslav's son Oleg in April 1078. That summer, Oleg's brother Gleb, who was still ruling Novgorod, was driven out, killed, and replaced with Iziaslav's son Sviatopolk. But around the same time, Oleg got support from the Cumans and his cousin Boris, and came back to claim Chernigov. Oleg and Boris defeated Vsevolod in August and Vsevolod came to Kiev to ask Iziaslav for support. He agreed, but died in battle against Oleg on 3 October 1078. He was the only incumbent Grand Prince of Kiev to be killed in battle.

== Children ==
Iziaslav had the following children with Gertrude:

- Yaropolk
- Mstislav (?–1069), was a Prince of Novgorod (1054–1067) which he lost to Vseslav of Polotsk. He had a son Rostislav Mstislavich that died in 1093.
- Eupraxia, may have been married to Mieszko Bolesławowic, son of Bolesław II the Bold in 1088.
- Sviatopolk ΙΙ grand prince of Kiev.

== Sources ==
- Martin, Janet (2007). Medieval Russia: 980–1584. Second Edition. E-book. Cambridge: Cambridge University Press. ISBN 978-0-511-36800-4.

Iziaslav I Yaroslavich Rurik Born: 1024 Died: 1078
Regnal titles
Preceded by reestablished	Prince of Turov; 1042–1078	Succeeded by Yaropolk Izyaslavich
Preceded by Yaroslav I	Grand Prince of Kiev; 1054–1073	Succeeded by Sviatoslav II
Titles in pretence
Preceded by Vladimir Yaroslavich	Grand Prince of Kiev; 1052–1054	Succeeded by Mstislav Izyaslavovich
Preceded by Sudislav Vladimirovich	2nd in line Grand Prince of Kiev; 1042–1052	Succeeded by Sviatoslav Yaroslavich
