= Vseslav of Polotsk =

Prince of Polotsk (r. 1044–1101) and Kiev (r. 1068–1069)

Vseslav the Seer
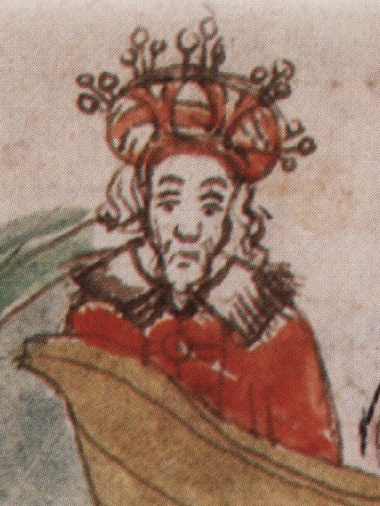
- Vseslav in the Radziwiłł Chronicle (15th century)

Grand Prince of Kiev
- Reign: September 1068 – April 1069
- Predecessor: Iziaslav I
- Successor: Iziaslav I

Prince of Polotsk
- Reign: 1044–1101
- Born: c. 1029; Polotsk
- Died: 24 April 1101 (aged ~72); Polotsk
- Burial: Cathedral of Holy Wisdom in Polotsk
- Issue more...: Gleb Vseslavich
Names
- Vseslav Bryachislavich
- Dynasty: Rurik
- Father: Bryachislav of Polotsk

Vseslav Bryachislavich (Note: Russian: Всеслав Брячиславич; Belarusian: Усяслаў Брачыславіч) (c. 1029 – 24 April 1101; also known as Vseslav the Sorcerer or Vseslav the Seer) was Prince of Polotsk (1044–1101) and Grand Prince of Kiev (1068–1069). Together with Rostislav Vladimirovich and voivode Vyshata, he created a coalition against the Yaroslaviches' triumvirate. Polotsk's Cathedral of Holy Wisdom, completed in the mid-11th century, is one of the most enduring monuments from his reign and the oldest stone building in Belarus.

== Biography ==
Vseslav was the son of Bryachislav Izyaslavich, Prince of Polotsk and Vitebsk, and was thus the great-grandson of Vladimir I of Kiev and Rogneda of Polotsk. He was born in c. 1029–1030 in Polotsk (with Vasilii as his baptismal name) and married around 1060.

He took the throne of Polotsk in 1044 upon his father's death, and although since 1093 he was the senior member of the Rurik dynasty for his generation, since his father had not been prince in Kiev, Vseslav was excluded (izgoi) from the grand princely succession. In fact, since he was the only major prince in Rus not descended from Yaroslav, he was, according to Simon Franklin and Jonathan Shepard, "an outsider from within"

Unable to secure the capital, which was held by Yaroslav's three sons, Vseslav started pillaging the northern areas of Kievan Rus. In 1065, he laid siege to Pskov but was thrown back. In the winter of 1066–1067, he pillaged and burnt Novgorod the Great, removing the bell and other religious objects from the Cathedral of Holy Wisdom and bringing them to decorate his own cathedral of the same name in Polotsk. His attack threatened to cut the sons of Yaroslav in the Middle Dnieper region off from Scandinavia, the Baltic region, and the far north, important sources of men, trade, and income (in furs for example) for the Rus princes in the Middle Dnieper. The attack also forced the young Mstislav, then enthroned in Novgorod, to flee back to his father, Iziaslav, in Kiev, and was thus an affront to the Kievan grand prince. The Yaroslavichi joined forces and marched north, sacking Minsk (then under the control of Polotsk) and defeating Vseslav in battle on the Nemiga River on March 3, 1067 Vseslav fled but was treacherously captured during the peace talks in June, when Iziaslav violated his oath. He was then imprisoned in Kiev.

=== Grand Prince of Kiev ===
During the Kiev Uprising of 1068, brought about by defeat at the hands of the Kipchaks on the Alta River and Iziaslav's unwillingness to arm the veche, so its members could march out and face the nomads the second time, the crowd freed Vseslav from prison, and proclaimed him grand prince of Kiev, forcing Iziaslav to flee to Poland. Returning with an army seven months later, Iziaslav retook his throne, and Vseslav fled back to Polotsk. After several years of complicated struggle with Iziaslav of Kiev, he finally secured Polotsk in 1071. During the last 30 years of his reign, his chief enemies were Vsevolod Yaroslavich and Vsevolod's son Vladimir Monomakh.

Vseslav died April 24, 1101, the Wednesday before Good Friday according to the Primary Chronicle; indeed, the chronicles strangely link the two events, as if the sorcerer had died as a result of the crucifixion and resurrection. He was buried in the Cathedral of Holy Wisdom in Polotsk.

== Family ==
Vseslav had six sons:

1. Roman (?-1114/1116), Prince of ? (probably of Drutsk). Roman perished either in Ryazan or Murom. His widow became a nun and lived in Polotsk, Saint Sophia Cathedral, where she opened her charity. They had no children.
2. Gleb Vseslavich, Prince of Minsk;
3. Rogvolod-Boris, Prince of Drutsk; There has been some discussion whether Vseslav had six or rather seven sons. Some historians (L.Alekseev and Vasily Tatishchev) believe that Boris was the baptism name of Rogvolod, and thus they were one and the same person.
4. Davyd, Prince of Polotsk,
5. Sviatoslav, Prince of Vitebsk;
6. Rostislav, possibly Prince of Lukoml. In 1129, he was sent to Byzantium by Vladimir II Monomakh, with the rest of Vseslaviches. It is uncertain who his wife or his descendants were.

St. Euphrosyne of Polotsk is sometimes said to be Vseslav's daughter, although her date of birth is given as 1120, two decades after Vseslav's death and thus she could not be his child; other sources, however, say she was the daughter of Sviatoslav Vseslavich, and thus a granddaughter of Vseslav. She founded a number of monasteries in Polotsk and the surrounding region, and is considered one of the patron saints of Belarus.

== Vseslav in literature and legend ==
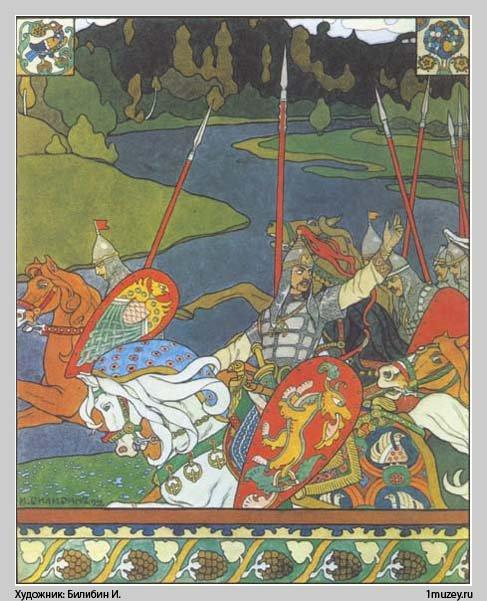
Volga Sviatoslavich, alias Volkh Vseslavich, the bogatyr based on Vseslav of Polotsk; a drawing by the Russian artist Ivan Bilibin.

=== Vseslav in chronicles ===
Vseslav had a great reputation for sorcery. The Russian Primary Chronicle states that he was conceived by sorcery and was born with a caul (a veil of birth membrane) on his head, and that the sorcerers told his mother that this should be bound to his head for the rest of his life as it was a sign of good luck. In modern Belarusian he is known as Usiasłaŭ the Sorcerer; in Russian he is Vselav Charadei or Vseslav Veshchii, Vseslav the Sorcerer or Vseslav the Seer.

=== Vseslav in The Tale of Igor's Campaign ===
Vseslav also appears in the 12th-century epic The Tale of Igor's Campaign, where, as in several byliny or folk-tales, he is depicted as a werewolf. In The Igor Tale, his defeat at the Nemiga River is shown to illustrate that inter-princely strife is weakening the Russian land. Vseslav is also said to be able to hear the church bells (stolen from Novgorod) of his cathedral at Polotsk all the way from Kiev:

"In the seventh age of Troyán Vséslav cast his lots for the Maiden dear to him."

"He with wiles at the last tore himself free: and galloped to the city of Kíev; with his weapon took hold of the golden throne of Kíev; galloped from them like a wild beast at midnight from Bĕ́lgorod, swathed himself in a blue mist, rent asunder his bonds into three parts, opened wide the gates of Nóvgorod, shattered the Glory of Yarosláv [the First]; galloped like a wolf from Dudútki to the Nemíga."

"On the Nemíga the sheaves are laid out with heads; men thresh with flails in hedgerows; on the barn-floor they spread out life; they winnow the soul from the body."

"On the blood-stained Nemíga the banks were sown with bane,—sown with the bones of the sons of Russia."

"Prince Vséslav was a judge to his subjects, he appointed cities for the princes: but he himself at night raced like a wolf from Kiev to the Idol [or, (accepting the reading of the text unaltered)—to the Lord] of Tmutarakáń, raced, like a wolf across the path of the great Khors."

"To him at Polotsk they rang the bells early for matins at Saint Sophia; and he at Kíev heard the sound."

=== Volkh Vseslavich/Volga Sviatoslavich and Vseslav of Polotsk ===
Vseslav may also be the basis for the bogatyr Volkh Vseslavich or Volga Sviatoslavich, who is found in a cycle of byliny. Volkhvs were priests of the pre-Christian Slavic religion and were thought to possess magical powers. This fact may be tied to Vseslav's alleged magical as well as his lupine aspects. In the Ruthenian Christianity volkhv is said to have been the son of a serpent and the Princess Marfa Vseslavevna and could transform himself into a wolf and other animals. That, of course, sounds as a fairy tale, however Christianity as a religion while still being challenged by people that followed the older traditions used this misinterpretation to outcast the followers of Slavic paganism. Volkhvs of Novgorod were well known to challenge the well established Christianity in Kiev in the 11th century, which resulted in Vseslav's victory when Mstislav Iziaslavovich fled to Kiev. Not long after that the same volkhvs were calling to uprising against Gleb Sviatoslavovich. Volkh appears in a number of drawings by the late-19th and early 20th-century Russian artist Ivan Bilibin, who was heavily influenced by Russian folklore.

== Notes ==
Vseslav of Polotsk Rurik Born: 1039 Died: 1101
Regnal titles
Preceded by Iziaslav I	Prince of Kiev; 1068–1069	Succeeded by Iziaslav I
Preceded by Bryachislav Izyaslavich	Prince of Polotsk; 1044–1101	Succeeded by Davyd Vseslavich
