= Drutsk =

Historical town in Belarus

Coordinates: 54°20′N 29°46′E

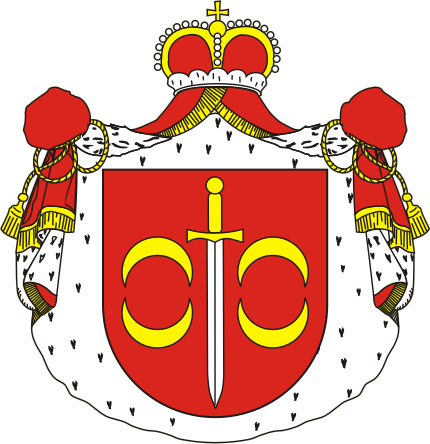
Druck Coat of Arms, possibly a variant of the Ostoja coat of arms

Drutsk (Belarusian: Друцк, [drutsk]; Polish: Druck, Russian: Друцк, also known as Дрютескъ (Dryutesk) or Дрюческъ (Druchesk) in the Middle Ages), is a historical town in Belarus, 40 kilometres (ca. 25 miles) west of Mogilev.

The town was established in 1078 as an outpost of the Principality of Polotsk on the road from Polotsk to Kiev and Chernigov. According to the Drutsk Gospel, the town was built around one of the oldest Christian churches in White Ruthenia erected in 1001.

In the 12th century and 13th century it was a centre of the early medieval Principality of Drutsk, ruled by the dukes of the Polotsk branch of the Rurikid dynasty. Since the 13th century there is only limited information about the town available in the chronicles.

In 1524 Drutsk has been burned down by Russians in a war and started to lose its political importance. Exact time and reasons of the town's decline are unknown. Historians estimate the period of decline to between the 15th and 17th centuries.

Archaeological researches state that Drutsk has been an important military fortress for some period of time. Until the mid 17th century it had a castle. Both the castle and the town have been destroyed and rebuilt for several times.

According to the German ambassador of the 17th century Johann Georg Korb, in the 16th century Drutsk was a large city that had about two hundred churches but that was then entirely destroyed in a war. Therefore, Korb compared the city with Troy.

The town is also the name-sake of the Drucki-Lubecki and Druckoy-Sokolinski noble families and the name-sake for their coat of arms, the Druck Coat of Arms. The most famous member of those families is Franciszek Ksawery Drucki-Lubecki.

== Sources ==
- Анатоль Мяснікоў. Горад на вольнай Друці... // Звязда, 27.6.2001.
- Аляксееў Л. В. Друцк // Беларуская Савецкая Энцыклапедыя. У 12 т. Т.4. Графік — Зуйка / Беларуская Савецкая Энцыклапедыя; Рэдкал.: П. У. Броўка (гал. рэд.) і інш. — Мн.: Бел.Сав.Эн., 1971. — 608 с.: іл., карты. No ISBN.
- Друцк старажытны: Да 1000-годдзя ўзнікнення горада / Рэд.кал.: Г.П.Пашкоў (гал.рэдактар) і інш.; Маст. У.М.Жук. –Мн.: БелЭН, 2000. —128 с.: іл. ISBN 985-11-0185-0
