= Prince of Tmutarakan =

The Prince of Tmutarakan (Russian: князь тмутараканский) was the title of the ruler of Tmutarakan, a principality of Kievan Rus'.

== List of princes ==
- Mstislav of Chernigov, 988–1036
- Sviatoslav II of Kiev
- Rostislav of Tmutarakan
- Gleb Svyatoslavich, 1036–1060
- Volodar of Peremyshl
- Oleg I of Chernigov, 1083–1094
