= Champion warfare =

Type of battle

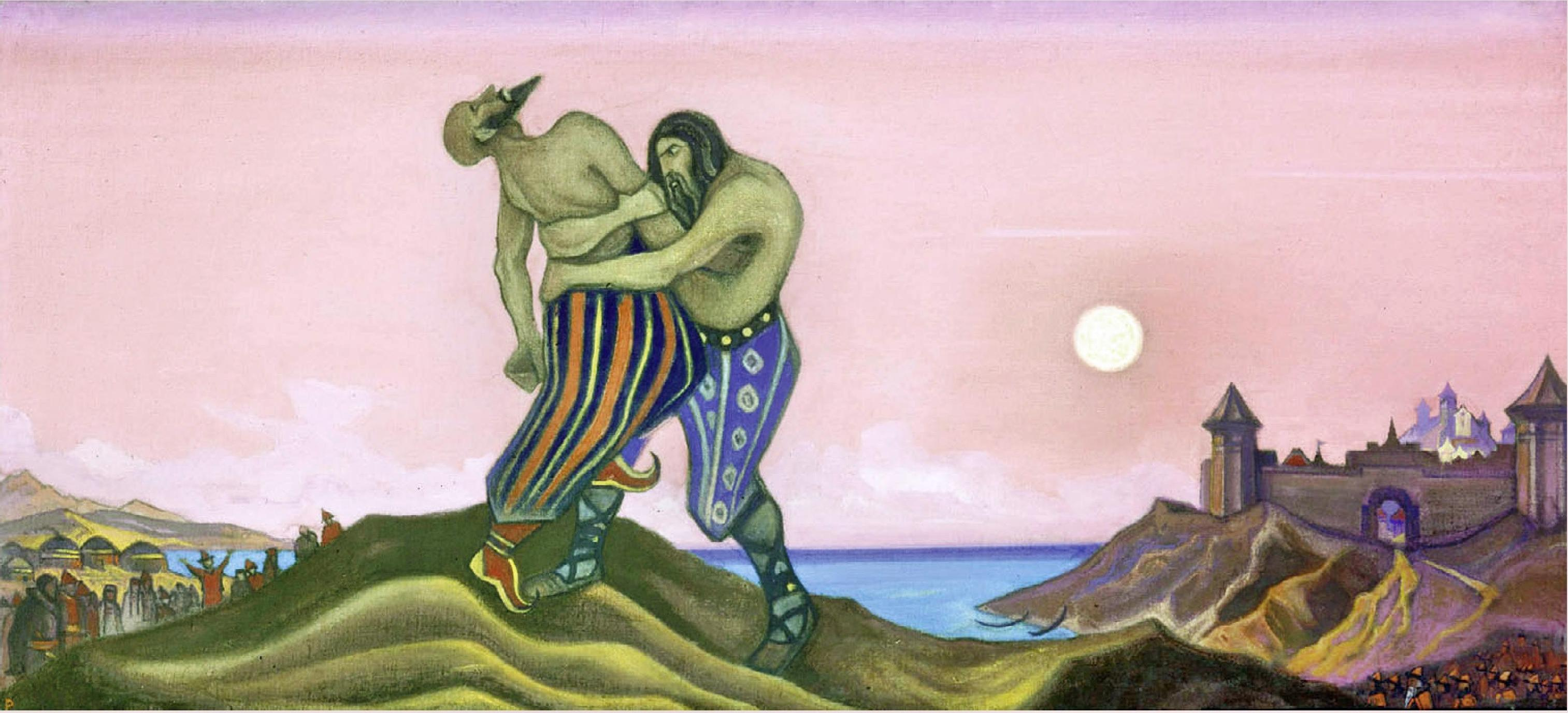
Tmutarakan ruler Prince Mstislav defeats Kassog Prince Rededya in 1022, ceasing mutual hostilities by way of duel. Painting by Nicholas Roerich, 1943.

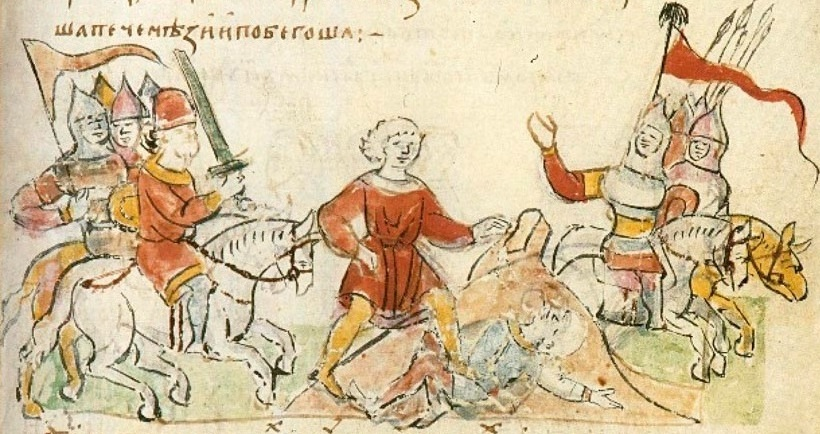
Grand Prince Vladimir (wielding a sword) beholds enemy forces withdraw as his champion Nikita the Tanner defeats the Pecheneg champion. Detail of a 15th-century medieval chronicle.

Champion warfare refers to a type of battle, most commonly found in the epic poetry and myth of ancient history, in which the outcome of the conflict is determined by single combat or duel between two combatants ("champions") chosen to represent each opposing side. Champion warfare can also refer to a battle in which armies actually engage, but champions within the armies fight so effectively as to single-handedly carry the sway of battle, such as in the Iliad.

== Champion warfare in literature ==
- Numerous instances of champion warfare can be observed in Homer's Iliad, most notably the climactic battle between Achilles and Hector, although there are many more.
- Champion warfare has numerous examples in Ferdowsi's Shahnameh (Book of Kings).
- Champion warfare is a common theme in the early books of Livy's history of Rome Ab Urbe Condita (From the Founding of the City), including the story of the famous triplets of the Horatii and Curiatii families and the great champion Horatius Cocles.
- Large-scale battles in the Chinese novels Romance of the Three Kingdoms and Water Margin typically begin with champion combat.
- The Combat of the Thirty in 1351 between competing French lineages was held as a model and pinnacle of chivalric combat.
- Champion warfare is a common occurrence in Indian epics such as the Mahabharata and the Ramayana. The latter's fate is decisively determined by Rama, and his nemesis Ravana
- In the Bible, the battle between David and Goliath is an example of champion warfare. Group champion combat, where a certain number of champions from each side battle, also existed, as shown in the Battle of Gibeon, where General Abner, loyal to King Ish-bosheth, had twelve champions duel twelve warriors chosen from the ranks of King David's army by General Joab. (2 Samuel 2:12–17 describes the duels themselves.)
- Champion warfare is a common theme in Irish mythology, notably in the Ulster Cycle, with Cú Chulainn fighting many duels.
- In the Old High German Hildebrandslied, champion warfare between a father and his son is the main theme.

== See also ==
- Single combat
- Holmgang
