= Vladimir of Novgorod =

Prince of Novgorod from 1036 to 1052

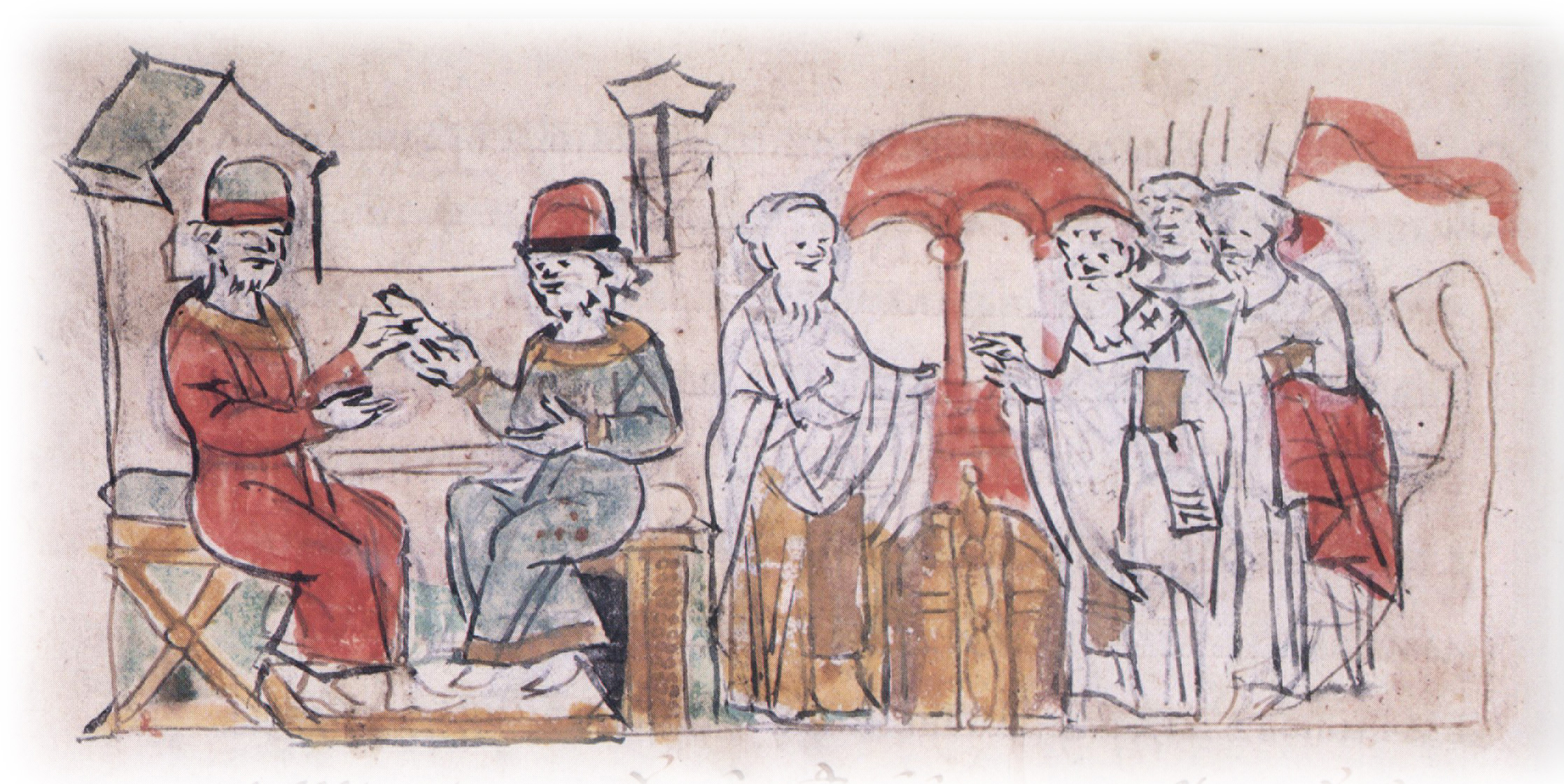
- Vladimir's accession to Novgorod by order of his father Yaroslav the Wise, Yaroslav's appointment of Luka Zhidiata, miniature from the Radziwiłł Chronicle (15th century)

Prince of Novgorod
- Reign: 1036–1052
- Born: 1020
- Died: 4 October 1052 (aged 31–32); Novgorod
- Burial: St. Sophia Cathedral, Novgorod
- Spouse: Anna
- Issue: Rostislav; Yaropolk
Names
- Vladimir Yaroslavovich
- House: Rurik
- Father: Yaroslav the Wise
- Mother: Ingegerd Olofsdotter

Vladimir Yaroslavich (Russian: Владимир Ярославич; Old Norse: Valdamarr Jarizleifsson; 1020 – 4 October 1052) was Prince of Novgorod from 1036 until his death in 1052. He was the eldest son of Yaroslav I the Wise by Ingegerd Olofsdotter, a daughter of Olof Skötkonung, the king of Sweden. He is venerated as a saint in the Eastern Orthodox Church, with his feast being on 4 October.

== Life ==
In state affairs, he was assisted by the voivode Vyshata and the bishop Luka Zhidiata. In 1042, Vladimir may have been in conflict with Finns, according to some interpretations even making a military campaign in Finland. In the next year he led the Russian armies against the Byzantine emperor Constantine IX. He predeceased his father by two years and was buried by him in St Sophia Cathedral he had built in Novgorod. His sarcophagus is in a niche on the south side of the main body of the cathedral overlooking the Martirievskii Porch. He is depicted in an early twentieth-century fresco above the sarcophagus and on a new effigial icon on top of the sarcophagus. The details of his death is unknown, however his son Rostislav and his descendants were in unfriendly relationship with the descendants of the Yaroslaviches triumvirate (Iziaslav, Sviatoslav, and Vsevolod). Three of Vladimir's younger brothers Izyaslav I, Svyatoslav II and Vsevolod I all reigned in Kiev, while other two (Igor and Vyacheslav) died in their early twenties after which their lands were split between the Yaroslaviches triumvirate. Coincidentally, Vyshata of Novgorod pledged his support to Rostislav in the struggle against the triumvirate.

Vladimir's only son, Rostislav Vladimirovich, was a landless prince who usurped power in Tmutarakan. His descendants were dispossessed by their uncles and were proclaimed as izgoi (outcast), but gradually managed to establish themselves in Halychyna, ruling the land until 1199, when their line became extinct. In order to downplay their claims to Kiev, the records of Vladimir's military campaigns seem to have been obliterated from Kievan chronicles. As a result, medieval historians often confuse him with two more famous namesakes — Vladimir the Great and Vladimir Monomakh. The name of Vladimir's consort is also uncertain: According to Nikolai Baumgarten, Vladimir was married to Ode, the daughter of count Leopold of Staden, whereas others (including Aleksandr Nazarenko) disregard that assumption or claim a different person.

Vladimir's memory was better preserved in foreign sources. In Norse sagas he frequently figures as Valdemar Holti (that is, "the Nimble"). George Cedrenus noticed Vladimir's arrogance in dealing with the Byzantines.

== Veneration ==
Saint Vladimir Yaroslavich of Novgorod

Right-Believing, Wonderworker
- Born: 1020
- Died: 4 October 1052
- Venerated in: Eastern Orthodox Church
- Canonized: 1439 by Euthymius II of Novgorod
- Feast: 4 October
- Attributes: sword

Vladimir was glorified as a saint in 1439 by Saint Euthymius II of Novgorod, the Archbishop of Novgorod. His feast day was established on 4 October.

Vladimir Yaroslavich Rurik Born: 1020 Died: 1052
Titles in pretence
Preceded by Yaroslav the Wise	Prince of Novgorod; 1034-1052	Succeeded by Iziaslav Yaroslavich
