= Roman Svyatoslavich =

Prince of Tmutarakan
- Reign: 1073 or after–1079
- Predecessor: Oleg Svyatoslavich (?)
- Successor: Oleg Svyatoslavich
- Born: c. 1052
- Died: 2 August 1079 (aged 26–27)
- House: Sviatoslavichi
- Father: Sviatoslav Iaroslavich
- Mother: Killikiya

Roman Svyatoslavich or Roman the Handsome (c. 1052 – 2 August 1079) was prince of Tmutarakan in Kievan Rus'. The starting year of his reign is uncertain, but he reigned his principality from around 1073 or 1077. His former allies, the Cumans killed him after their unsuccessful joint campaign against his uncle, Vsevolod I of Kiev.

== Life ==
Principalities in the Kievan Rus' (1054-1132)

Roman was the son of Sviatoslav Iaroslavich, Prince of Chernigov and his first wife, Killikiya. The order of seniority of Sviatoslav's four sons by Killikiya is uncertain: Roman might have been the second or fourth among them. According to historian Martin Dimnik, he was born around 1052. He was named after his father's saintly uncle, Boris whose baptismal name was Roman.

The starting year of Roman's reign in Tmutarakan cannot certainly be determined. According to Martin, he seems to have succeeded his brother Oleg who moved to Vladimir after their father became Grand Prince of Kiev in 1073. However, no source makes mention of Oleg's or Roman's reign in Tmutarakan in this period.

The Russian Primary Chronicle writes that Boris Vyacheslavich "fled to join Roman in Tmutorakan" after reigning in Chernigov for eight days in May 1077. In less than a year, Roman's brother, Oleg also settled in Tmutarakan. Boris and Oleg allied with the Cumans against their uncle, Vsevolod, who had seized Chernigov. However, they were defeated on 25 August. In the summer of 1079, Roman made an alliance with the Cumans against Vsevolod. They advanced as far as the confluence of the rivers Sula and Dnieper, but Vsevolod made a peace with the Cumans, forcing Roman to withdraw. While he was returning to Tmutarakan, the Cumans murdered him on 2 August.

Roman advanced with [Cuman] forces as far as Voin', but Vsevolod remained near Pereyaslavl' and made peace with the [Cumans]. Roman returned homeward with them, but they killed him on August 2. The bones of Svyatoslav's son and Yaroslav's grandson still lie there even to this day.

— Primary Chronicle

No source makes mention of Roman's marriage or his descendants, implying that he never married and died childless. The Lay of Igor's Campaign mentions him as "handsome Roman, son of Sviatoslav".

== Sources ==
=== Primary sources ===
- "The Lay of Igor's Campaign" In Medieval Russia's Epics, Chronicles, and Tales: Revised and Enlarged edition (Edited by Serge A. Zenkkovsky) (1974). Penguin Books. pp. 167–192. ISBN 0-452-01086-1.
- The Russian Primary Chronicle: Laurentian Text (Translated and edited by Samuel Hazzard Cross and Olgerd P. Sherbowitz-Wetzor) (1953). Medieval Academy of America. ISBN 978-0-915651-32-0.

=== Secondary sources ===
- Dimnik, Martin (1994). The Dynasty of Chernigov, 1054–1146. Pontifical Institute of Mediaeval Studies. ISBN 0-88844-116-9.
- Franklin, Simon; Shepard, Jonathan (1996). The Emergence of Rus 750–1200. Longman. ISBN 0-582-49091X.
