= Steward (office) =

Representative of a head of state, usually for a colony

A steward was the manager of a household or estate for its owner. They might be upper servants, but where the employer was a great noble they were often themselves members of the gentry class.

At the highest level "stewards" were officials appointed by a monarch or other government to represent them in a country and who may have a mandate to govern it in their name; in the latter case, it is synonymous with the position of regent, vicegerent, viceroy, king's lieutenant (for Romance languages), governor, or deputy (the Roman rector, praefectus, or vicarius).

== Etymology ==
From Old English stíweard, stiȝweard, from stiȝ "hall, household" + weard "warden, keeper"; corresponding to Dutch: stadhouder, German Statthalter "place holder", a Germanic parallel to French lieutenant.

The Old English term stíweard is attested from the 11th century. Its first element is most probably stiȝ- "house, hall" (attested only in composition; its cognate stiȝu is the ancestor of Modern English sty). Old French estuard and Old Norse stívarðr are adopted from the Old English.

The German and Dutch term (Middle High German stat-halter) is a parallel but independent formation (a calque of lieutenant) corresponding to obsolete English stead holder (stede haldare 1456; also stedys beryng (1460), sted-haldande (1375) steadward, steadsman).

In medieval times, the steward was initially a servant who supervised both the lord's estate and his household. The butler was a lower role, responsible for wine and other drinks. However it became convenient to divide the role, so that by the 13th century, there were commonly two stewards in a great house—one who managed the estate and the other, the majordomo, to manage domestic routine. Stewards might earn up to 3 to 4 pounds per year. Stewards took care of their lord's castles when they were away. Also, stewards checked on the taxes of the serfs on their lords' manors.

In the New Testament, the word Greek: οικονομος (oikonomos) in Luke's parable of the unjust office-holder is typically translated as "steward" in older translations, but is often translated as "manager" in more recent translations.

== British Isles ==
The Lord High Steward of England held a position of power in the 12th to 14th centuries, and the Lord Steward is the first dignitary of the court. The Stewart family traces its appellation to the office of the High Steward of Scotland. Lord High Steward of Ireland is a hereditary office held since the 15th century.

== Low Countries ==
In the Netherlands, it developed into a rare type of de facto hereditary head of state of the thus crowned Dutch Republic.

Stadtholders were appointed by feudal lords to govern parts of their territory. Stadtholders could be appointed for the whole or parts of their territory by the local rulers of the independent provinces in the Low Countries (e.g., the Duke of Gelre appointed a stadtholder to represent him in Groningen). In the Low Countries (which included present-day Netherlands, Belgium, and Luxembourg), from the Middle Ages to the 18th century, this was originally an essentially honorary title awarded by the Spanish Habsburg kings to major noblemen in each province, but its nature changed drastically.

== Northern Europe ==
=== Danish Statholder ===
- In Denmark, a ministerial high office of royal governor in the capital, at Copenhagen Castle

=== Norwegian Statholder ===
In Norway, the office of Statholder existed both during the Dano-Norwegian personal union from 1536 to 1814 and during the Swedish-Norwegian personal union from 1814 until it was abolished in 1873, while the union lasted until 1905. During the latter, the office was also known as Rigsstatholder, or Lieutenant of the Realm. The Statholder governed Norway on behalf of the King. Since Norway was a separate kingdom with its own laws and institutions, it was arguably the most influential office in both Denmark-Norway and in the Swedish-Norwegian realm second to that of the king. The office was sometimes held by the Crown Prince, who was styled as Viceroy.

The term Statholder (from German Statthalter) means "place holder" (i.e., the one governing on behalf of the king). The modern Norwegian spelling is stattholder.

== Southern Europe ==
=== Ban of Croatia ===
The Croatian office of the Ban was equivalent to a viceroy. The Ban was appointed by the monarch (King of Croats until 1102, King of Hungary 1102–1526, Austrian ruler 1527–1918) with a mandate to govern a part of country, or whole country, in the name of the King of Dalmatia, Croatia, and Slavonia.

=== Ban of Bosnia ===
Bosnia was a banate of the Kingdom of Hungary 1136–1377. During that period, Bosnia was governed by an autonomous hereditary viceroy, called a ban. The last of them, Tvrtko, became the first king of the Kingdom of Bosnia.

== Eastern Europe ==
The Russian equivalent of "stadtholder" is posadnik; the term sometimes occurs as "stadtholder" in English-language literature. Although there were such legendary posadniks as Gostomysl (9th century), the term first appeared in the Primary Chronicle in the year of 997 to denote the most senior official of an Eastern Slavic town. The earliest posadniks of the city of Novgorod (Holmgard) include a dynasty composed of Dobrynya, his son Konstantin Dobrynich, and Ostromir.

== Freemasonry ==
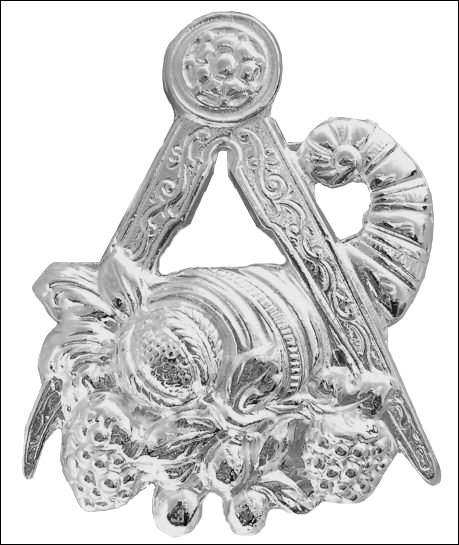
Freemasonry Stewards Jewel

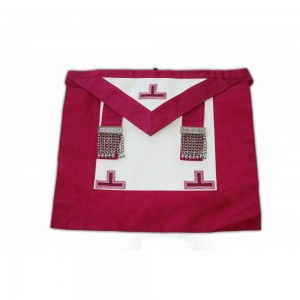
Masonic regalia: the Grand Stewards apron

The office of Steward or Grand Steward is an elected office of merit in Freemasonry. The main duty of the Steward is to attend to visitors and to assist other officers in their duties. The Grand Stewards may provide special assistance at Lodge Installations. The Stewards Jewel consists of a cornucopia with compasses above.

== See also ==
- Bailli
- Ban of Croatia
- Butler
- Castellan
- Chamberlain (office)
- Luogotenente
- Mayor of the Palace
- Seneschal
- Viceroy
