= Vladimir I =

Vladimir I may refer to:

- Vladimir the Great (c. 958 – 1015)
- Vladimir of Novgorod (1020–1052)
