= Vyshata =

Russian associate

Vyshata (Russian: Вышата; died after 1064) was the son of the posadnik of Novgorod, Ostromir. He had a son, Yan Vyshatich.

Vyshata was an associate of Vladimir Yaroslavovich, the prince of Novgorod. The authors of the Primary Chronicle made use of Yan's tales, tending to emphasise Vyshata's leadership in the Russo-Byzantine war of 1043 at the expense of Ivan Tvorimich, who was most likely the commander-in-chief. After his defeat near Constantinople, Vyshata was taken prisoner and spent three years in confinement in Byzantium. Having his return, he supported Rostislav Vladimirovich's attempt to capture the principality of Novgorod, and after its failure, fled to Tmutarakan where Rostislav became a prince. He is known to have had another son by the name of Putiata.

Vyshata is mentioned as the right-hand man to Sadko, in Onega-Novgorod byliny.

== Sources ==
- "Вышата" . Brockhaus and Efron Encyclopedic Dictionary (in Russian). 1906.
