= Rededya =

- Prince of Kassogia
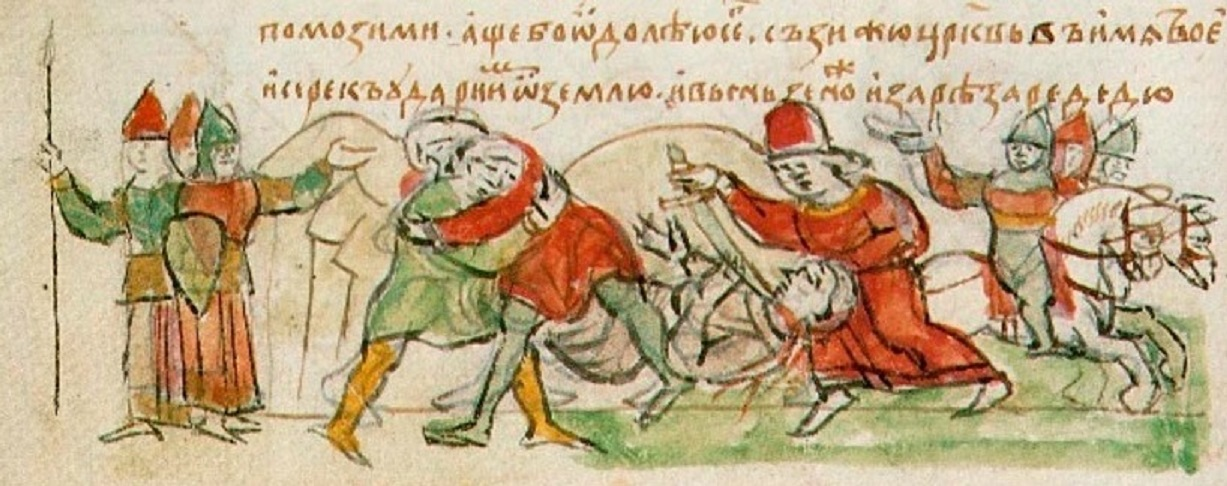
- Rededya's death, miniature from the Radziwiłł Chronicle (15th century)
- Died: 1022; Tmutarakan
- Issue: Yure; Roman
- Religion: Khabzeism

Rededya, also called Ridade or Rededey (Adyghe: Ридадэ; died 1022), was a prince of the Kassogs, a medieval Northwest Caucasian people generally regarded as the ancestors of the Circassians. He ruled in Kassogia, a medieval state in the North Caucasus.

== History ==
The Laurentian Codex provides the following information. In 1022, Prince Mstislav the Brave, who at the time was the prince of Tmutarakan, started a military operation against the Alans. During the operation, he encountered the Kassogian army commanded by Rededya. To avoid unnecessary bloodshed, Mstislav and Rededya, who possessed an extraordinary physical strength, decided to have a personal fight, with the condition that the winner would be considered the winner of the battle. The fight lasted some hours and, eventually, Rededya was knocked to the ground and stabbed with a knife. The subjects of Rededya were forced to admit defeat. Mstislav ascribed his win to the Virgin, whom he prayed to before the battle.

Subsequently, Mstislav has taken the wife and the two sons of Rededya and had them baptized. In their baptism, Rededya's sons got the names of Yury and Roman. Roman later married Tatyana, the daughter of Mstislav.

Traditionally, Kassogians are considered as direct ancestors of the Circassians. Some modern Russian historians claimed they may have come to the Caucasus from the Middle East and subsequently assimilated.

== In art ==
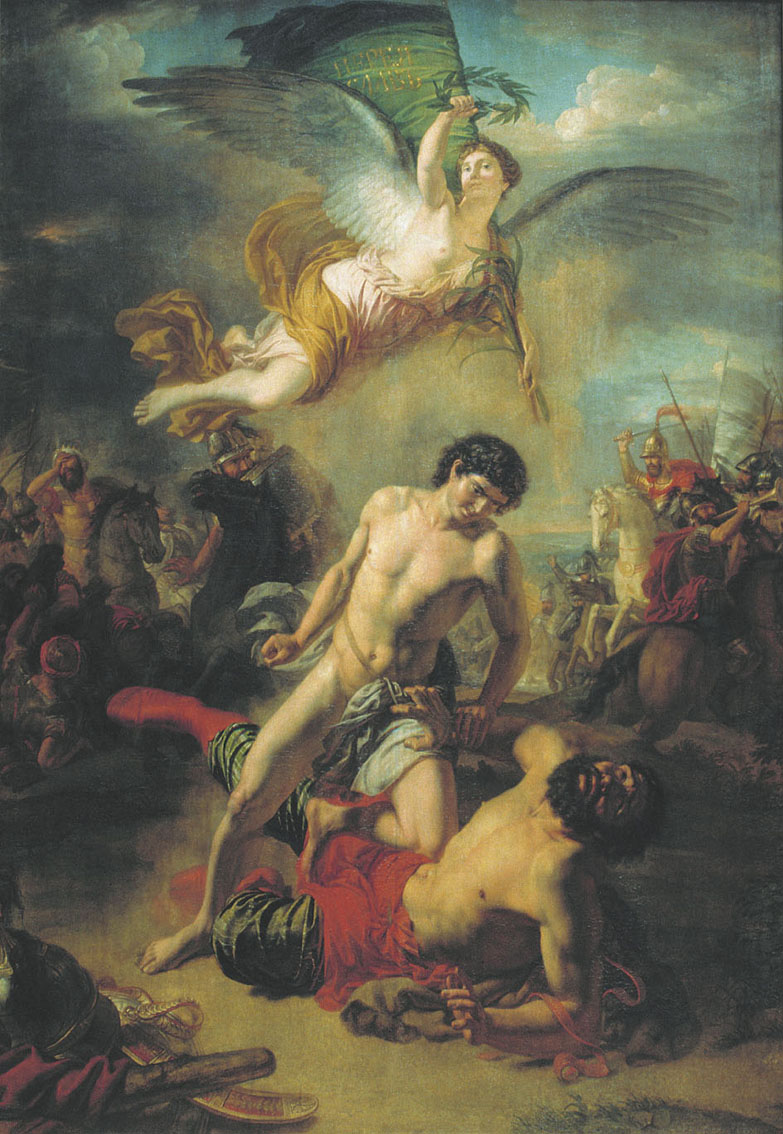
"The Single Combat of Prince Mstislav Vladimirovich the Bold with the Kosozh Prince Rededey." Artist: Andrey Ivanov (1812).

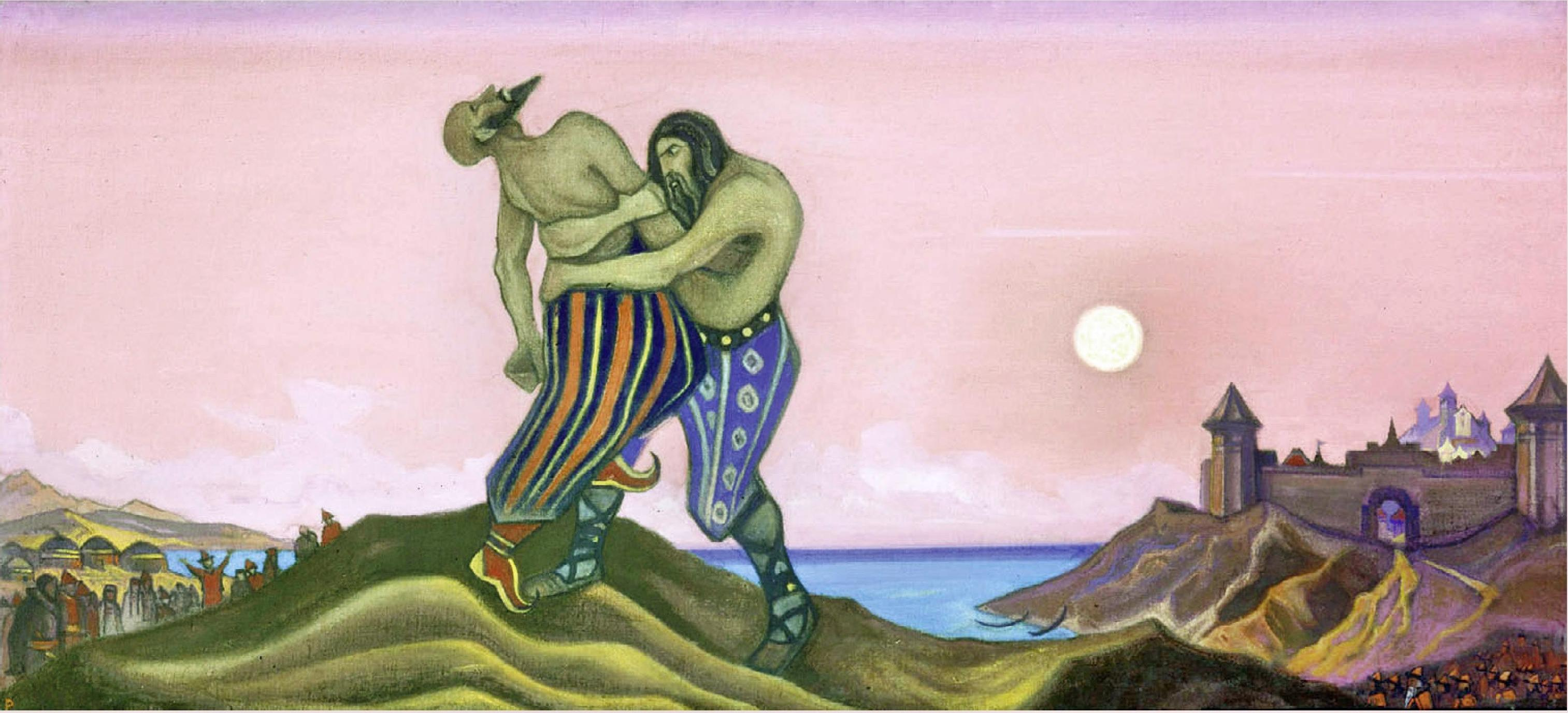
The duel between Mstislav and Rededya, painting by Nicholas Roerich (1943)

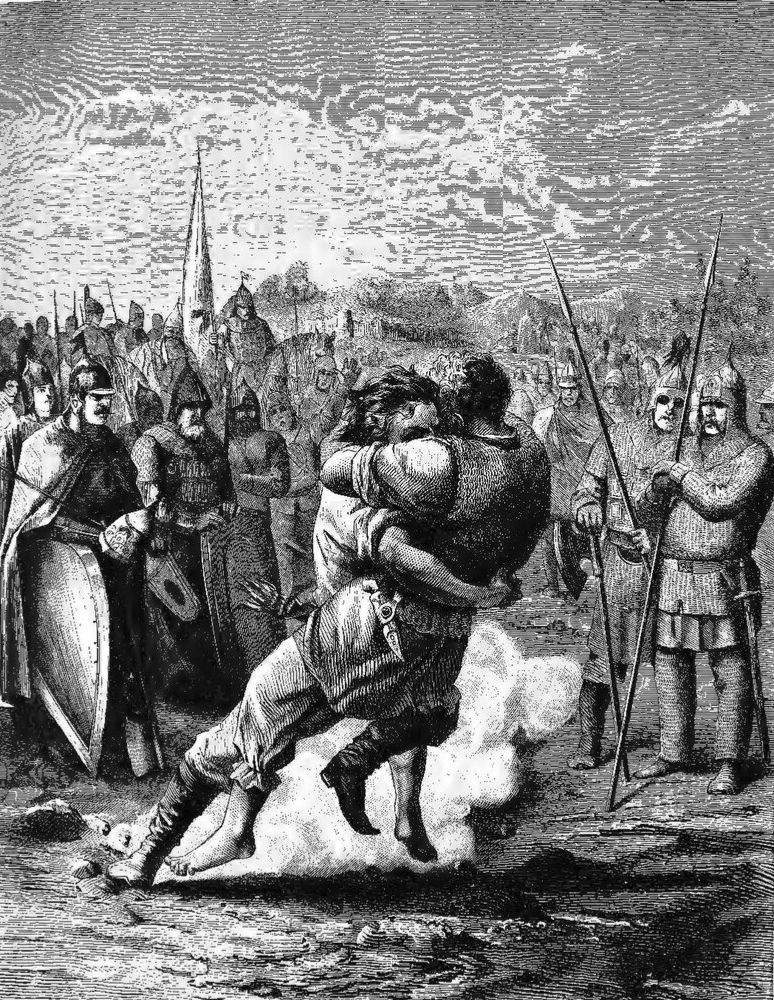
"Mstislav's Combat with Rododeya" Medieval engraving by Richard Brend'amour

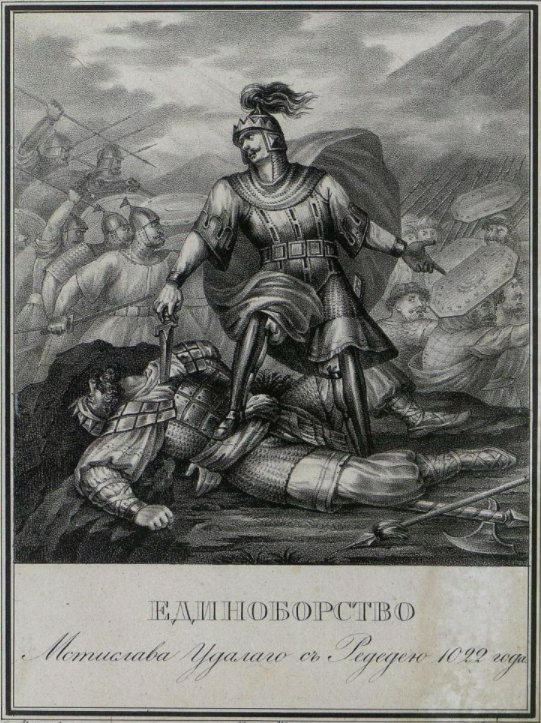
Mstislav the Brave over the body of Rededya
