= Battle of Snovsk =

1068 battle

- Part of the Rus'–Cuman wars
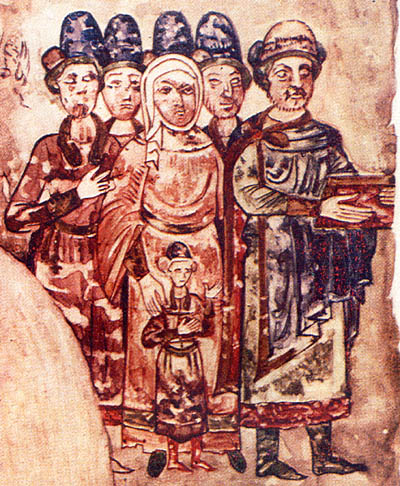
- Sviatoslav and his family
Date	1 November 1068
Location	near Chernihiv, Kievan Rus'
Result	Rus' victory

Belligerents
Kievan Rus'	Cuman–Kipchak Confederation

Commanders and leaders
Sviatoslav II	Khan Sharukan (surrendered)

Strength
3,000	12,000

Casualties and losses
Unknown	Heavy

The Battle of Snovsk (Note: Ukrainian: Битва на Снові, romanized: Bytva na Snovi. Russian: Битва у Сновска, romanized: Bitva u Snovska.) was a battle in 1068 near Chernigov. According to the results of the battle, the Cumans who invaded the territory of Kievan Rus' were forced to retreat.

== Background ==
In the middle of the 11th century, conflicts between Rus' and nomads began, and the latter managed to inflict a major defeat on the Rus' at the Battle of the Alta River. The Cumans began to plunder the main principalities of Rus'. To counteract them, the prince of Kiev came out with 3,000 close warriors. 12,000 Cumans acted against them.

== Battle ==
Many details of the battle are not known, but an entry on the Battle of Snovsk appears in columns 171 to 173 of the Primary Chronicle (PVL). It features a brief inspiring speech made by Svyatoslav before the battle. He attacked the main forces of the Cumans (Polovtsi or Polovcians), who began to retreat and suffered heavy losses. The Khan was captured.

While the Polovcians were ravaging throughout the land of Rus', Svyatoslav was meanwhile at Chernigov. As soon as the pagans raided around Chernigov itself, Svyatoslav collected a small force and sallied out against them to Snovsk. The Polovcians remarked the approaching troop and marshalled their forces for resistance. When Svyatoslav observed their numbers, he said to his followers, "Let us attack, for it is too late for us to seek succor elsewhere." They spurred up their horses, and though the Polovcians had twelve thousand men, Svyatoslav won the day with his force of only three thousand. Some of the pagans were killed outright, while others were drowned in the Snov', and their prince was captured on November 1. Svyatoslav thus returned victorious to his city.

— Primary Chronicle, 1953 translation by Cross & Sherbowitz-Wetzor

== Bibliography ==
=== Primary sources ===
- Cross, Samuel Hazzard; Sherbowitz-Wetzor, Olgerd P. (1953) [1930]. The Russian Primary Chronicle, Laurentian Text. Translated and edited by Samuel Hazzard Cross and Olgerd P. Sherbowitz-Wetzor (PDF). Cambridge, Massachusetts: The Mediaeval Academy of America. p. 325. (The first 50 pages are a scholarly introduction).

=== Literature ===
- Pashuto, Vladimir (1968). Внешняя политика Руси [The foreign policy of Russia] (in Russian). Наука.
- Gumilev, Lev (2023) [1996]. От Руси к России [For Rus' to Russia]. Эксклюзивная классика (in Russian) (revised ed.). Moscow: AST. ISBN 978-5-17-153845-3.
