= Rostislav of Tmutarakan =

Rostislav Vladimirovich
- Prince of Tmutarakan izgoi Prince of Rostov (~1056); Prince of Volyn (1056-1064)
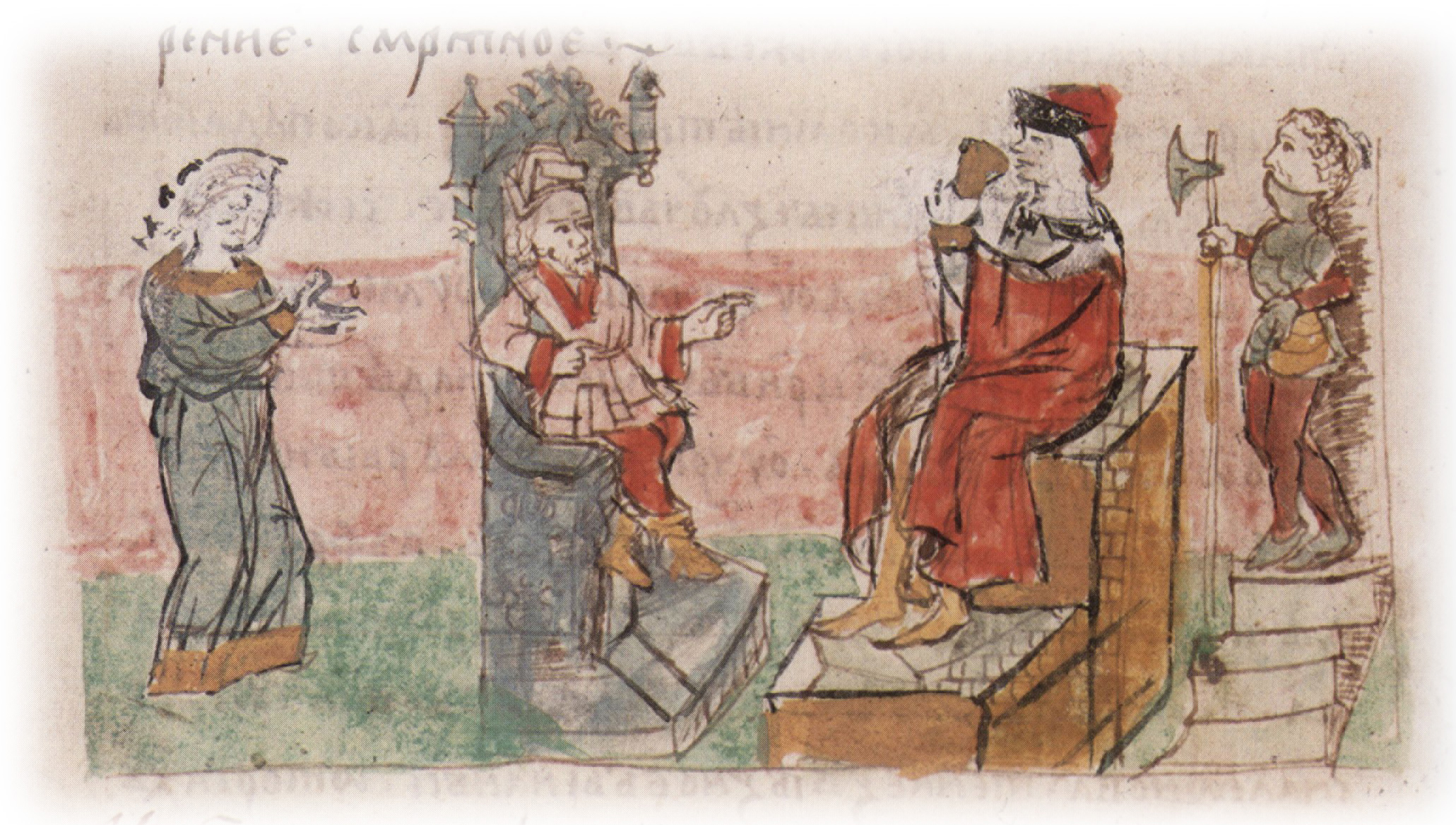
- Poisoning of Rostislav with a poisoned cup, miniature from the Radziwiłł Chronicle (15th century)
- Reign: 1064–1065
- Born: c. 1038
- Died: 3 February 1066 [aged ~28] Tmutarakan
- Burial: Theotokos Church, Tmutarakan
- Spouse: Anna Lanke
- Issue: Rurik Rostislavich; Volodar of Peremyshl; Vasilko Rostislavich
Names
- Rostislav Vladimirovich
- House: Rurik dynasty
- Father: Vladimir Yaroslavovich
- Mother: Anna (Aleksandra)

Rostislav Vladimirovich (Note: Russian: Ростислав Владимирович, Belarusian: Расціслаў Уладзіміравіч, Ukrainian: Ростислав Володимирович) (c. 1038 – 3 February 1066) was a landless prince (izgoi) from the Rurikid dynasty of Kievan Rus’. He was baptized as Mikhail. According to the Russian genealogist Nikolai Baumgarten, the mother of Rostislav was Oda of Stade, a daughter of the Stade Count Leopold. That claim is also supported by other historians.

At his younger age, Rostislav ruled Rostov in the land of the Merya. His father Vladimir of Novgorod was the eldest son of Yaroslav I of Kiev. If Vladimir had not predeceased his father, he would have succeeded to the Kievan throne. Under the East Slavic house law, the early death of Rostislav's father made his descendants forfeit all claims to Kiev.

For five years after his father's death, Rostislav who was about 14 years old had no appanage. Finally, his uncles gave him Volhynia and Galicia, where he stayed from 1057 and 1064, guarding the western frontier of the Rus' lands. According to Vasily Tatischev, it was there that he married Anna Lanke, the daughter of King Béla I of Hungary. Rostislav did not like the distant and meager land and, in 1064, assisted by his father's close friend Vyshata, seized the rich Tmutarakan on the Black Sea littoral, previously controlled by the House of Chernigov.

His predecessor, Gleb Svyatoslavich, escaped to his father, Svyatoslav II of Chernigov who was part of the Yaroslaviches triumvirate. The latter approached Tmutarakan with his army and Rostislav was forced to leave the city. Once Svyatoslav returned to Chernigov, Rostislav expelled Gleb once again from Tmutarakan and entered the city in triumph. During his brief rule, he subdued the local Circassians (also known as Kasogi) and other indigenous tribes. His success provoked the rivalry of neighboring Greek Chersonesos in Crimea, whose envoy poisoned him on 3 February 1066.

== Notes ==
Preceded by Gleb Sviatoslavich	Prince of Tmutarakan; 1064–1065	Succeeded by Gleb Sviatoslavich
Preceded by Igor Yaroslavovich	Prince of Volyn; 1056–1064	Succeeded by
Preceded by	Prince of Rostov; 1056	Succeeded by
