= Stone of Tmutarakan =

11th-century inscription

Coordinates: 59.9409°N 30.3126°E

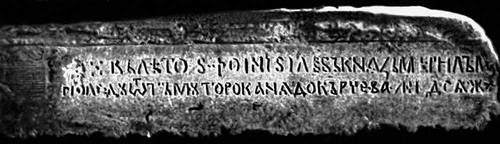
Stone of Tmutarakan

The Stone of Tmutarakan (Russian: Тмутараканский камень) is a marble slab with an Old Russian (Old East Slavic) inscription that was discovered in 1792 on the Taman Peninsula in Russia. It contains the following words: "In the year 6576 [ A.M., 1068 A.D] the sixth of the Indiction, Prince Gleb measured across the sea on the ice from Tmutarakan to Kerch 14,000 sazhen" (Old Russian: Въ лѣто 6576 індикта 6 Глѣбъ кнѧзь мѣрилъ м[оре] по лєду ѿ Тъмутороканѧ до Кърчєва 10000 и 4000 сѧжє[нъ]; Modern Russian: В лето 6576 индикта 6 Глеб князь мерил море по льду от Тмутороканя до Корчева 14000 сажен).

== Description ==
A sazhen, an old unit of length, was equal to seven feet (or corresponded roughly to a fathom); thus the Kerch Straits, according to the stone, were 88,000 feet or 18.5 miles across (that is, from Kerch to Tmutarakan — the straits themselves are only 4.5 miles wide at their narrowest point, but the distance from the site of Tmutarakan to modern-day Kerch is about 15 miles). The 10th-century Byzantine emperor Constantine Porphyrogenitus wrote that the straits were the equivalent of 18 miles across.

Gleb Svyatoslavich, then prince of Tmutarakan, is mentioned in the inscription. Gleb was later the prince of Novgorod, where he saved Bishop Fedor's life by chopping a sorcerer in half who led a pagan uprising against the bishop. Gleb was eventually killed fighting pagan Finnic tribes in the northern Novgorodian lands (Zavolochye or za volokom, 'the land beyond the portage') on May 30, 1079.

The stone was discovered in the village of Taman, located on the Taman Peninsula just east of Crimea in 1792. The inscription was first published in 1794 by Aleksei Musin-Pushkin. The study of the inscription is said to be the first epigraphic study in Russian history. In spite of its importance in the history of Russian epigraphy, a number of scholars have called the stone's provenance into question and consider the stone an 18th-century forgery, perhaps done by Romanticists enamored of ancient culture or even as an effort to find precedent for Russian involvement in the Caucasus.

The stone is currently housed in the State Hermitage Museum in Saint Petersburg.

== See also ==
- List of individual rocks

== Sources ==
- Tunkina, Irina V. (1 September 2025). "Archaeological Research of F. Marschall von Bieberstein in the East Crimea and on the Taman Peninsula in 1793–1795". Greeks and Barbarians Networking on the Shores of the Black Sea and Beyond: ἘΠΙΣΚΎΘΙΣΟΝ: Studies Presented to ASKOLD IVANTCHIK on his Sixtieth Birthday, May 2, 2025. BRILL. ISBN 978-90-04-31007-0.
