= Izgoi =

Archaic medieval Russian term for a prince excluded from the line of succession

Izgoi or izgoy (Russian: изгой) is a term that was originally used in Kievan Rus'. In primary sources, it indicated orphans who were protected by the church. In historiographic writing on the period, the term was meant as a prince in Kievan Rus' who was excluded from succession to the Kievan throne because his father had not held the throne before, as exemplified by Yaroslav the Wise's two youngest sons becoming izgoi.

In Kievan Rus', as well as Appanage and early Muscovite Russia, collateral succession, rather than linear succession, was practiced, with the throne being passed from the eldest brother to the youngest brother and then to cousins until the fourth in line of succession (not to be confused with "fourth cousins") in a generation before it was passed on to the eldest member of the senior line if his father had held the Kievan throne. The princes were placed in a hierarchy or "ladder" or "staircase" of principalities, which Sergei Soloviev called the "rota system" (rota being the Old Church Slavonic term for a ladder or staircase), with Kiev as the pinnacle. When the grand prince of Kiev died, the next prince on the ladder moved up the ladder, and the rest advanced a rung as well.

Any prince whose father had not held the throne, such as for having predeceased the grandfather, who was then grand prince, was excluded from succession and was known as izgoi.

The term is also found in the expanded version of the Russkaya Pravda, where it meant an orphan or exile; thus, an izgoi prince is in some sense seen as an "orphaned" or "exiled" prince since he was left outside of the succession to the Kievan throne. However, he was not, usually, landless, unlike what is sometimes stated, as he still held the patrimonial land granted to him in the provinces.

An example of an izgoi prince would be Vseslav of Polotsk, whose father, Briacheslav (d. 1003), and grandfather, Iziaslav (d. 1001), both predeceased Vseslav's great-grandfather, Vladimir the Great (d. 1015). Thus, Vseslav was izgoi since he could not legitimately claim the grand princely throne in Kiev: neither his father nor his grandfather had sat on the throne. However, he remained prince of Polotsk, in what is now northeastern Belarus. Furthermore, in spite of his excluded status, Vseslav briefly seized the throne of Kiev in 1069 but held it only six months before he was ousted. Another example (there are many others) would be Rostislav Vladimirovich, the son of Vladimir Yaroslavich. Since Vladimir had died in 1052, two years before his father, Yaroslav the Wise (d. 1054), he had never held the Kievan throne, and Rostislav was izgoi. However, his descendants became princes of Galicia, in what is now northwestern Ukraine. They were excluded from holding the grand princely throne in Kiev but were not landless.

== Sources ==
- "Изгои" . Brockhaus and Efron Encyclopedic Dictionary (in Russian). 1906.
