= Gleb Svyatoslavich =

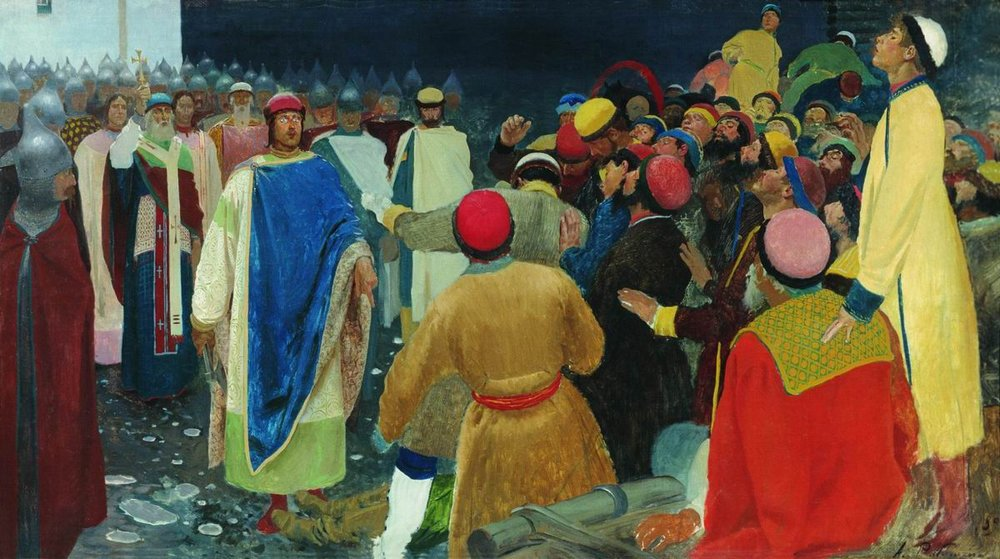
- Knyaz Gleb Svyatoslavovych kills Magi at the Novgorod veche (Prince's Court) painting by Andrei Ryabushkin

Prince of Tmutarakan
- 1st reign 2nd reign 3rd reign: before 1064–1064; 1065; 1067–1067 or 1068
- Predecessor: Sviatoslav Iaroslavich; Rostislav Vladimirovich; Rostislav Vladimirovich
- Successor: Rostislav Vladimirovich; Rostislav Vladimirovich; Oleg Svyatoslavich (?)

Prince of Novgorod
- Reign: 1067 or 1068–1078
- Predecessor: Mstislav Izyaslavich
- Successor: Sviatopolk Izyaslavich
- Born: c. 1052
- Died: 30 May 1078 (aged 25–26); Zavoloch'e district (Principality of Novgorod)
- Burial: Holy Savior Cathedral, Chernigov (Chernihiv, Ukraine)
- House: Sviatoslavichi
- Father: Sviatoslav Iaroslavich
- Mother: Killikiya

Gleb Svyatoslavich (c. 1052 – 30 May 1078) was Prince of Tmutarakan and Novgorod of Kievan Rus'. He ruled Tmutarakan under the overall authority of his father Sviatoslav Iaroslavich, Prince of Chernigov. He was twice expelled from his principality by one of his cousins Rostislav Vladimirovich.

His father appointed him prince of Novgorod in 1067 or 1068. He suppressed a rebellion incited by a volkhv against the bishop of the town. Later he was expelled from Novgorod and was killed by the Chudes. The Russian Primary Chronicle writes that he "was kindly toward the poor and hospitable to strangers, zealous toward the church, warm in faith, peaceful, and fair in appearance".

== Early life ==
Gleb was the eldest of four sons of Sviatoslav Iaroslavich, Prince of Chernigov by his first wife, Killikiya. According to historian Martin Dimnik, Gleb was born around 1049. He was named after his father's holy uncle, Gleb. His father appointed him to rule Tmutarakan, an important port by the Strait of Kerch, but the year of his appointment is unknown.

== Prince of Tmutarakan ==
According to the Russian Primary Chronicle, Gleb's cousin Rostislav Vladimirovich "fled to Tmutorakan" in 1064. He expelled Gleb from Tmutorakan and "occupied his principate for himself". Although Gleb was restored by his father in 1065, once Sviatoslav Iaroslavich had returned with his army to Chernigov, Rostislav invaded again and displaced Gleb from power once more.

However, the Byzantine katepano or governor of Cherson poisoned Rostislav who died on 3 February 1067. According to the Life of Feodosy, the citizens of Tmutorakan requested the monk Nikon the Great to persuade Sviatoslav Iaroslavich to again appoint Gleb as their prince. The saintly monk succeeded and Gleb returned to Tmutarakan. According to the inscription of the "Stone of Tmutarakan", Gleb had the width of the frozen Strait of Kerch measured in the winter of 1067-68.

== Prince of Novgorod ==
Principalities in the Kievan Rus' (1054-1132)

Gleb was transferred—according to historian Martin Dimnik, by his father—from Tmutarakan to Novgorod in 1067 or 1068. A distant relative of his, Vseslav Briacheslavich lay siege to Novgorod "on October 23, the day of the Lord's brother, St James, a Friday, at the sixth hour of the day", according to the Chronicle of Novgorod. However, Gleb and the Novgorodians routed him on the brook Gzen near the town.

Gleb's rule in Novgorod was confirmed when his father became the Grand Prince of Kiev in 1073. According to the Hypatian version of the Russian Primary Chronicle, Gleb visited his father in Kiev and witnessed the death of the saintly Abbot Feodosy of the Monastery of the Caves in 1074. He seems to have been on friendly terms with his cousin, Vladimir Monomach whose first son was born in his court at Novgorod. A late source—Vasily Tatishchev's compilation of medieval chronicles—writes that Sviatoslav Iaroslavich appointed Gleb and Vladimir Monomach to command the Rus' troops sent to fight against the Bulgarians at Cherson upon the request of the Byzantine Emperor Michael VII Ducas, but the source's reliability is doubtful.

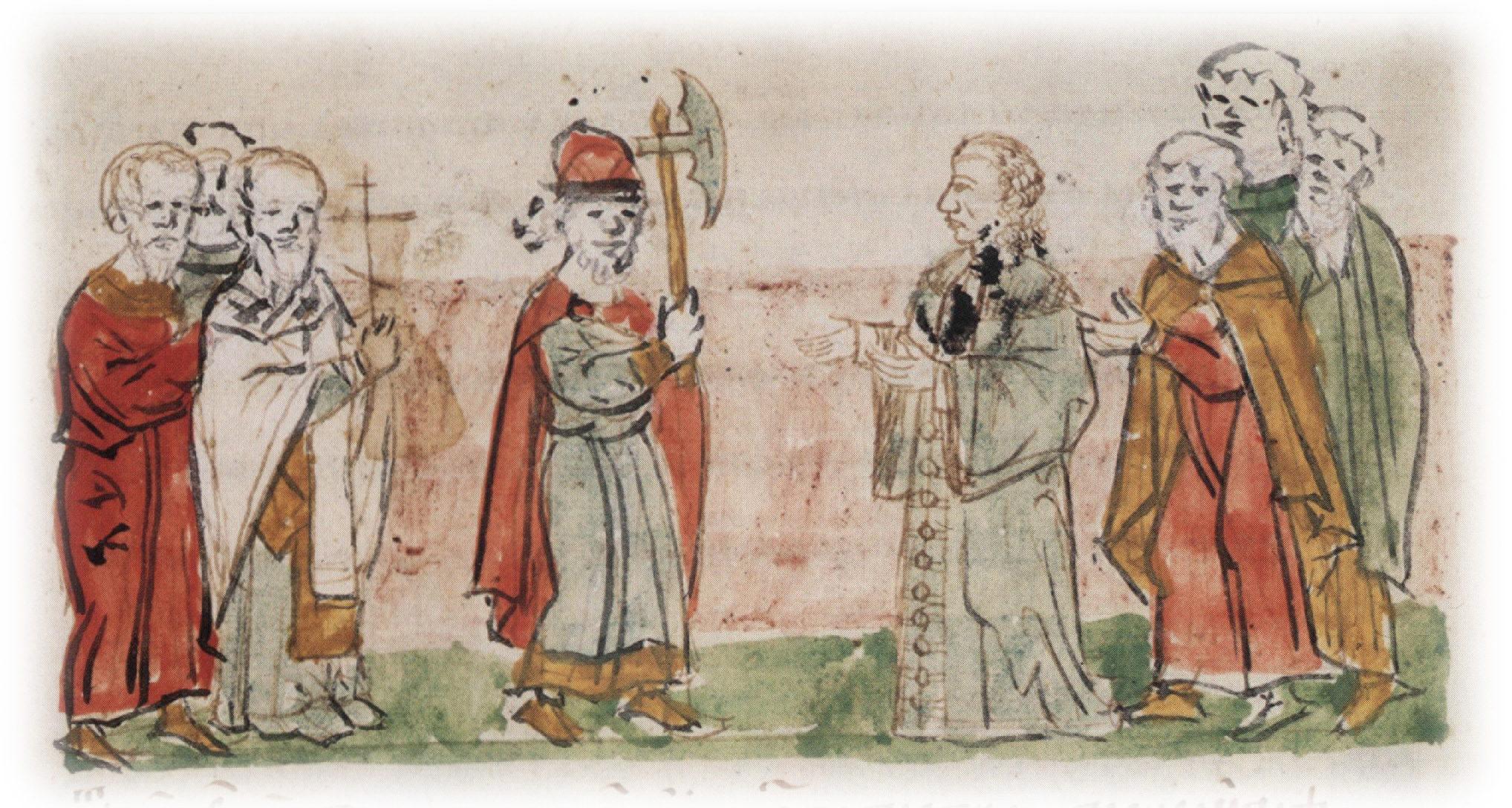
Gleb killing the volkhv, Radziwill Chronicle

The Russian Primary Source narrates that a "magician" (a volkhv) arrived in Novgorod and stirred up the townsfolk against the bishop. The volkhv planned to murder the prelate but Gleb and his druzhina or retinue remained loyal to him. Gleb dared the volkhv who had stated that he could foretell the future to predict "what was about to happen that very day", according to the Russian Primary Chronicle. The volkhv declared that he would "perform great miracles", but Gleb pulled out an axe and killed him. After the volkhv's death, his followers broke up.

Gleb's father died on 27 December 1076. According to Novgorodian sources, the citizens of the town rose in revolt and dethroned Gleb in 1078. He fled beyond the lands beyond the river Volkhov, known as Zavoloch'e, where the Chudes killed him on 30 May. His body was transferred to Chernigov where he was buried in the Holy Savior Cathedral on 23 July. No source makes mention of Gleb's marriage or his children, suggesting that he never married and died childless.

== See also ==
- Stone of Tmutarakan

== Sources ==
=== Primary sources ===
- The Russian Primary Chronicle: Laurentian Text (Translated and edited by Samuel Hazzard Cross and Olgerd P. Sherbowitz-Wetzor) (1953). Medieval Academy of America. ISBN 978-0-915651-32-0.
- The Chronicle of Novgorod, 1016–1471 (Translated from the Russian by Rober Michell and Nevill Forbes, with an introduction by C. Raymond Beazley, and an account of the text by A. A. Shakhmatov) (1914, 2011). BiblioLife.

=== Secondary sources ===
- Dimnik, Martin (1994). The Dynasty of Chernigov, 1054–1146. Pontifical Institute of Mediaeval Studies. ISBN 0-88844-116-9.
- Franklin, Simon; Shepard, Jonathan (1996). The Emergence of Rus 750–1200. Longman. ISBN 0-582-49091X.
- Martin, Janet (1993). Medieval Russia, 980–1584. Cambridge University Press. ISBN 978-0-521-67636-6.
- Vernadsky, George (1948). A History of Russia, Volume II: Kievan Russia. Yale University Press. ISBN 0-300-01647-6.

Gleb Svyatoslavich Sviatoslavichi Born: ???? Died: 1078
Regnal titles
Titles in pretence
Preceded by Yaropolk Izyaslavich	Grand Prince of Kiev; 1073–1076	Succeeded by Vladimir Monomakh
