= Ostromir =

Russian noble

Ostromir (Russian: Остромир; Christian name: Joseph; died c. 1057) was the posadnik of Novgorod from 1054 to 1057.

== Life ==
Ostromir is known from the first Russian dated book, the Ostromir Gospels, which he commissioned from his scribe Gregory. The chronicles record that Ostromir was the father of Vyshata and the grandfather of Yan Vyshatich. The Ostromir Gospels names his wife as Theophana, viewed by Andrzej Poppe as a daughter of Anna Porphyrogeneta and Vladimir the Great. Another popular speculation posits Konstantin Dobrynich as the father of Ostromir.

According to the Sofia First Chronicle, Ostromir died in 1056 during his military campaign against the Chudes. It is highly unlikely, however, since the afterword to the Ostromir Gospels clearly states that he was still alive in 1057.

== Sources ==
- "Остромир" . Brockhaus and Efron Encyclopedic Dictionary (in Russian). 1906.
