= Yan Vyshatich =

Nobleman and military commander in Kievan Rus'

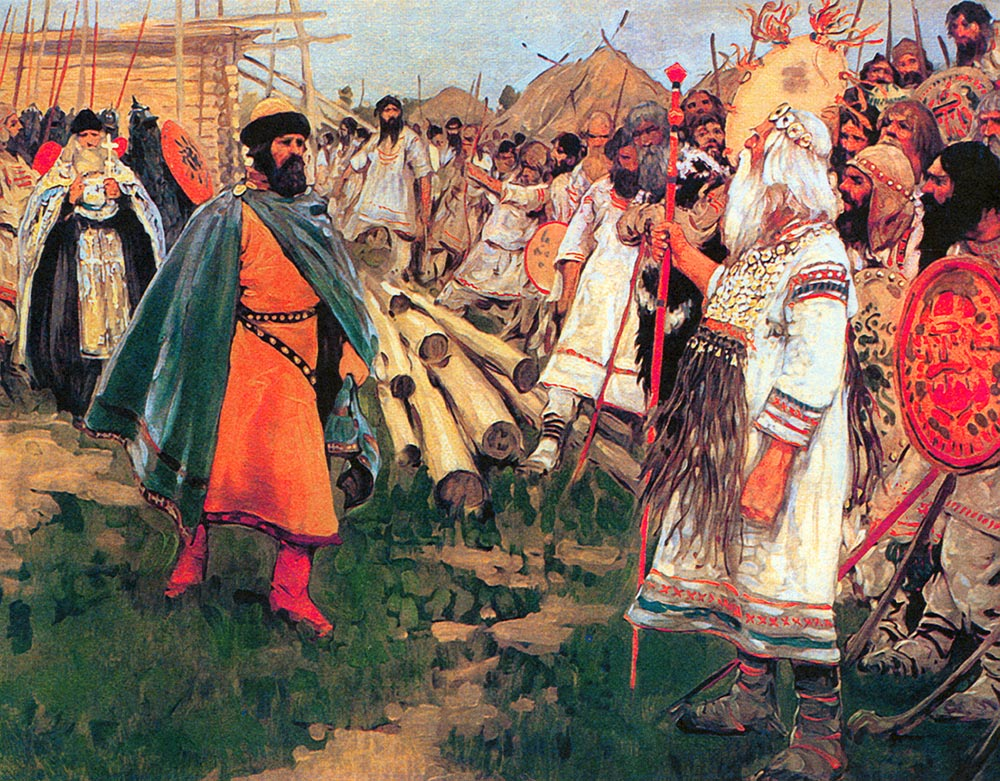
Yan Vyshatich meets tribesmen. Painting by Sergey Ivanov, 1912

Yan Vyshatich (Note: Russian: Ян Вышатич; Ukrainian: Ян Вишатич, romanized: Yan Vyshatych.) (c. 1016 – 24 June 1106) was a nobleman who served as the military commander (tysyatsky) of Kiev. The last known representative of the Dobrynya dynasty, Yan Vyshatich was the son of Vyshata and a grandson of Ostromir.

Historical clues about Yan's career are scarce. In the 1070s, Yan Vyshatich collected tribute for Sviatoslav II near Beloozero and suppressed an uprising of smerds there. He took part in military campaigns against the Polovtsy and internecine wars. Yan Vyshatich's tales of his and his ancestors' campaigns were Nestor's major source in compiling the Primary Chronicle.

== Sources ==
- "Иоанн Вышатич" . Brockhaus and Efron Encyclopedic Dictionary (in Russian). 1906.
- Franklin, Simon; Shepard, Jonathan (6 June 2014) [1996]. The Emergence of Rus 750-1200. Routledge. ISBN 978-1-317-87224-5.
