= Rus'–Byzantine War (1043) =

Historical naval raid against Constantinople by the Kievan Rus'

- Part of a series of Rus'–Byzantine wars
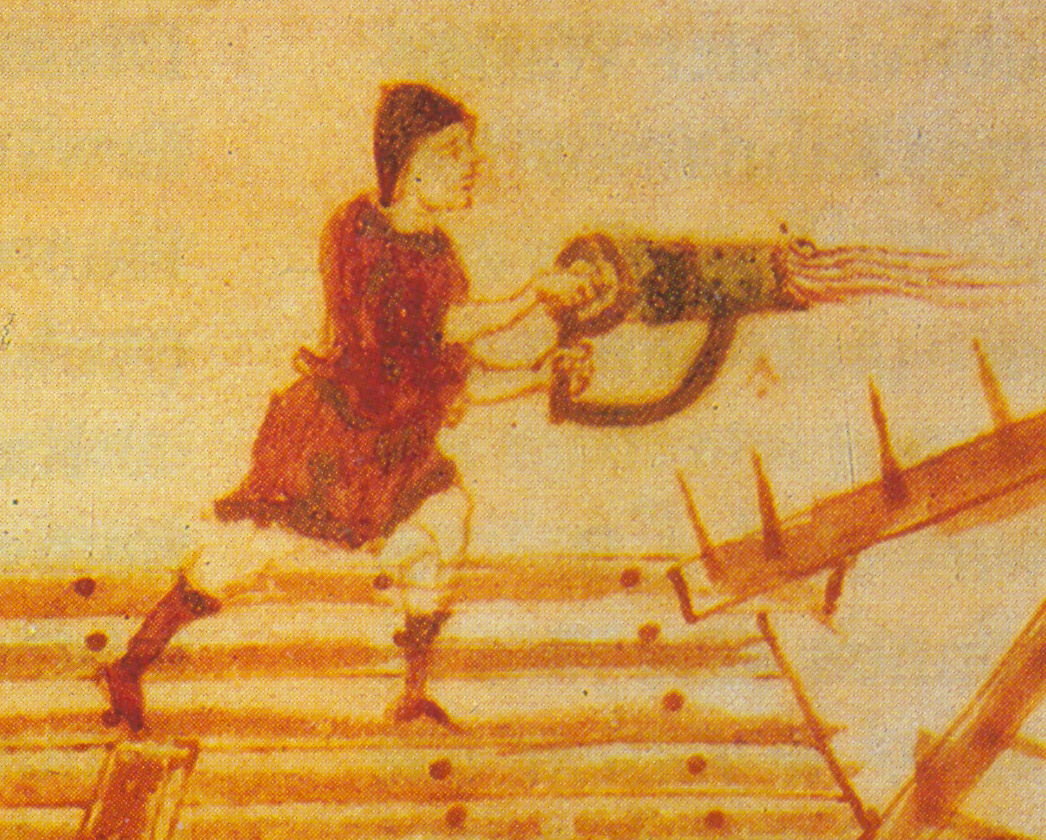
Date	1043
Location	Constantinople, Byzantine Empire
Result	Byzantine victory

Belligerents
Byzantine Empire	Kievan Rus'

Commanders and leaders
Katakalon Kekaumenos	Unknown

Casualties and losses
Unknown	5,000+ killed, 800 captured

The final Rus'–Byzantine War was, in essence, an unsuccessful naval raid against Constantinople instigated by Yaroslav the Wise and led by his eldest son, Vladimir of Novgorod, in 1043.

The reasons for the war are disputed, as is its course. Michael Psellus, an eyewitness of the battle, left an account detailing how the invading Kievan Rus' were annihilated by a superior Imperial fleet with Greek fire off the Anatolian shore. According to the Slavonic chronicles, the Rus' fleet was destroyed by a tempest.

The Byzantines sent a squadron of 14 ships to pursue the dispersed monoxyla of the Rus'. They were sunk by the Ruthenian admiral Ivan Tvorimich, who also managed to rescue Prince Vladimir after the shipwreck. The Varangian Guard was also present. A 6,000-strong Ruthenian contingent under Vyshata, which did not take part in naval action, was captured and deported to Constantinople. Eight hundred of the Ruthenian prisoners were blinded.

Vyshata was allowed to return to Kiev at the conclusion of the peace treaty three years later. Under the terms of the peace settlement, Yaroslav's son Vsevolod I married a daughter of Emperor Constantine Monomachus. Vsevolod's son by this princess assumed his maternal grandfather's name and became known as Vladimir Monomakh.

== Crimean campaign of 1044 ==
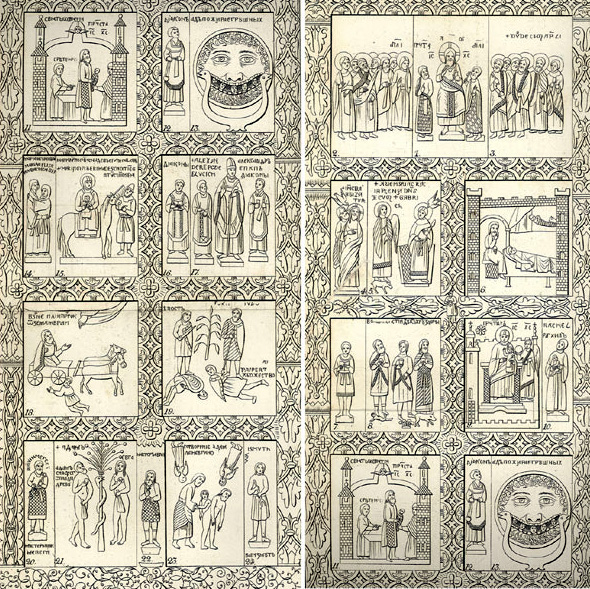
Current version of the Korsun Gate of the Novgorod Cathedral is probably of German provenance

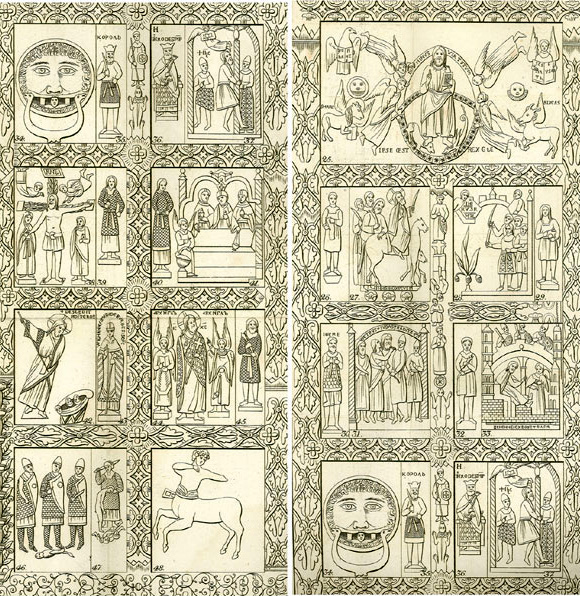
Another side of the gate

There are good reasons to believe that the campaign was not over in 1043 (as Greek sources seem to imply), but continued with the Rus' capture of Chersonesos (Korsun') the following year:

- In his 16th-century account of the 1043 campaign, Maciej Stryjkowski narrates that Yaroslav sent his son Vladimir to seize the Crimean emporia of the Greek empire, notably Chersonesos.
- Novgorodian traditions link Vladimir's foundation of the Saint Sophia Cathedral in Novgorod in 1045 with his prior victory over the Greeks. The cathedral formerly boasted the so-called Korsun Treasure, which was reportedly brought to Novgorod by Prince Vladimir (usually identified by medieval authors with Vladimir the Great). Among foreign authors, Herberstein and Paul of Aleppo relate that the copper Korsun Gate of the cathedral was seized by the Novgorodians in Chersonesos, where it had been used as a city gate. The extant cathedral gate is decorated with complicated cross symbols, specifically associated by art historians with Chersonesos. Excavations of Chersonesos yielded an inscription reporting that the city gate had to be replaced in 1059. Apart from the gate, the treasure contained gold vessels, the miraculous icon of the Theotokos of Korsun and other early 11th-century Greek items (some of them still in situ, others looted by Ivan the Terrible after the Massacre of Novgorod and taken to Moscow).
- Having visited Kyiv in 1048, Roger II of Châlons reported that he had seen there the relics of St. Clement of Rome. According to Roger, Yaroslav told him that the relics had been taken by him from Chersonesos, where Clement had been supposedly martyred. Slavonic sources claim that Clement's relics were brought to Kiev from Crimea by Yaroslav's father Vladimir.

Careful analysis of these facts led Vera Bryusova to conclude that hostilities were renewed in 1044 or 1045, when Vladimir advanced on Chersonesos and captured it, retaining the town until the Byzantines, involved in several other wars, agreed to conclude a favourable treaty with Rus' and give a princess in marriage to his younger brother. If so, the situation would be almost identical to the conquest of Chersonesos by Vladimir the Great, which, according to most Slavonic sources, precipitated the Christianization of Kievan Rus' back in 988.

Bryusova argues that later pious legends confused Vladimir of Novgorod with his more famous grandfather and canonized namesake, who most likely never waged wars against Byzantium. Some late medieval authors went as far as to ascribe this Crimean campaign to another celebrated Vladimir, Monomakh, who in fact derived his main foreign support from Constantinople. For instance, Vasily Tatishchev, writing in the 18th century from much earlier sources, erroneously reports that Monomakh engaged a Greek governor of Chersonesos in single combat.

== Bibliography ==
- George Vernadsky. The Byzantine-Russian war of 1043. "Sudostforschungen" Bd. XII. Munchen.1953, S. 47–67.
- Andrzej Poppe. La derniere expedition Russe contre Constantinople. "Byzantinoslavica" XXXII/I, 1971, s. 1-29.
- Kazhdan, Alexander, ed. (1991). The Oxford Dictionary of Byzantium. Oxford and New York: Oxford University Press. ISBN 0-19-504652-8.
- Брюсова В.Г. Русско-византийские отношения середины XI века. // Вопросы истории, 1973, №3, pages 51–62.
- Sverrir Jakobsson, The Varangians: In God’s Holy Fire (Palgrave Macmillan, 2020), pp. 81-83.ISBN 978-3-030-53797-5
