= Trubizh =

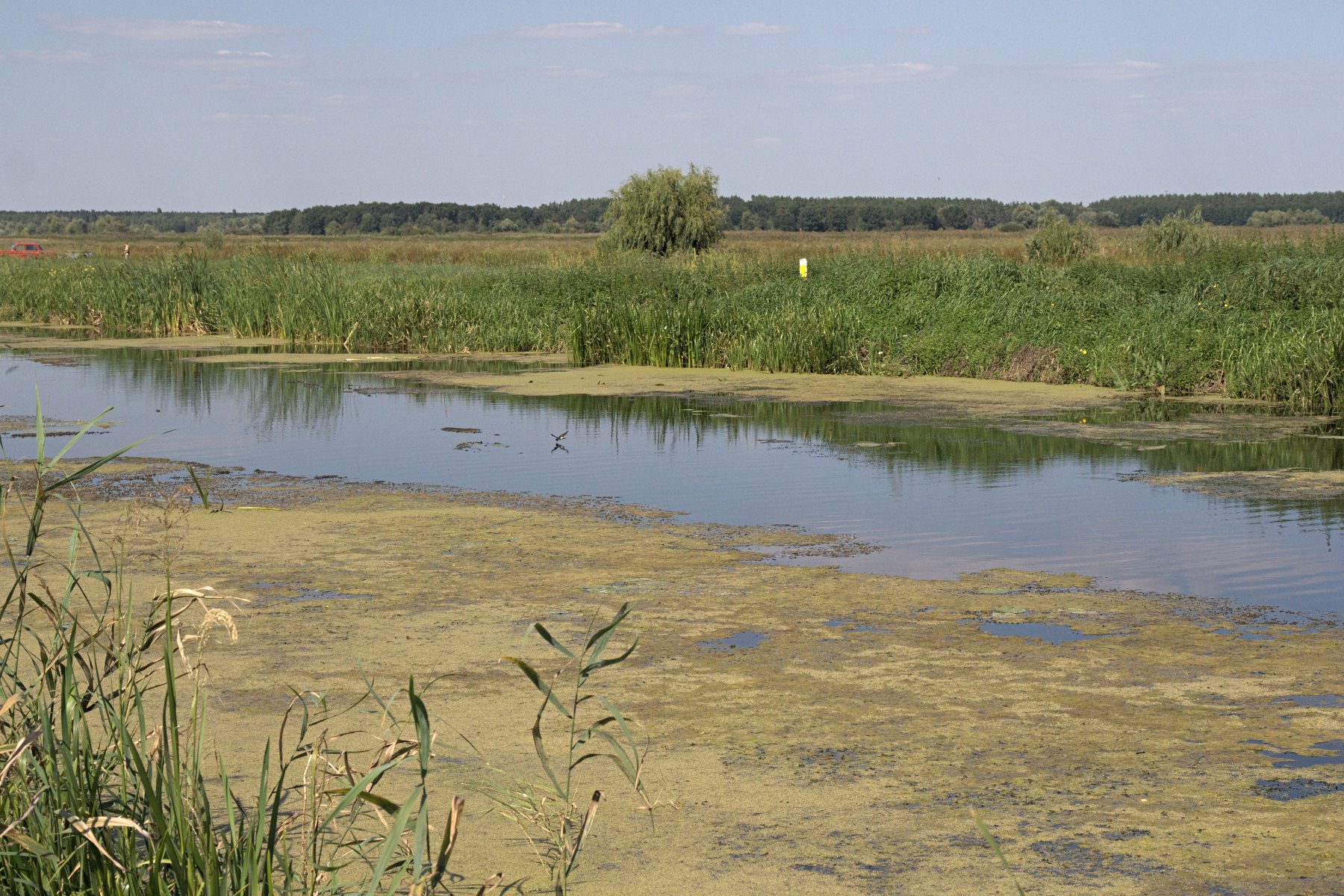

Location
- Country: Ukraine

Physical characteristics
- Source
  - location: Ukraine
- Mouth: Dnieper
  - coordinates: 50.0294°N 31.4255°E
- Length: 113 km (70 mi)
- Basin size: 4,700 km^{2} (1,800 sq mi)

Basin features
- Progression: Dnieper→ Dnieper–Bug estuary→ Black Sea
- Tributaries
  - right: Alta

The Trubizh (Ukrainian: Трубіж; Russian: Трубеж) is a river entirely located in Ukraine, a left tributary of Dnieper. It falls into the Dnieper's Kaniv Reservoir (named after Kaniv). It is 113 kilometres (70 mi) long, and has a drainage basin of 4,700 square kilometres (1,800 sq mi).

Major cities: Pereiaslav.
