= Konstantin Dobrynich =

Russian noble

Posadnik of Novgorod

Personal details
- Died: 1022

Konstantin Dobrynich (Russian: Константин Добрынич; died 1022) was an 11th-century posadnik of Novgorod. According to Novgorodian chronicles, he was the son of Dobrynya and wielded great influence at the court of his own cousin, Yaroslav the Wise.

== Life ==
The time at which he became posadnik is uncertain, as are the circumstances. In 1018, he is said to have destroyed the boats which Yaroslav intended to use for fleeing to Scandinavia from his brother Svyatopolk I. Konstantin persuaded Yaroslav to continue his war against Svyatopolk, helped him muster a new druzhina and regain the Kievan throne. Several years later, he fell into disgrace, for reasons unknown, fled to Rostov and was eventually assassinated in Murom at the behest of Yaroslav.

Historians tend to view Konstantin as a leader of an anti-Varangian party in Novgorod. His conflict with the Varangians is sometimes given as a reason for the promulgation of the earliest part of the Russkaya Pravda. On the other hand, the chronicle's information about his career may have been biased, if Konstantin indeed was the ancestor of the chronicle's co-author, Yan Vyshatich, as many historians speculate.

He died in 1022.

== Sources ==
- "Константин Добрынич" . Brockhaus and Efron Encyclopedic Dictionary (in Russian). 1906.
- Yanin, Valentin L. (2003). Новгородские посадники [Novgorodian posadniks] (in Russian). Языки славянской культуры. ISBN 978-5-94457-106-9.
