= Mstislav of Chernigov =

Earliest attested prince of Tmutarakan and Chernigov in Kievan Rus'

Mstislav Vladimirovich
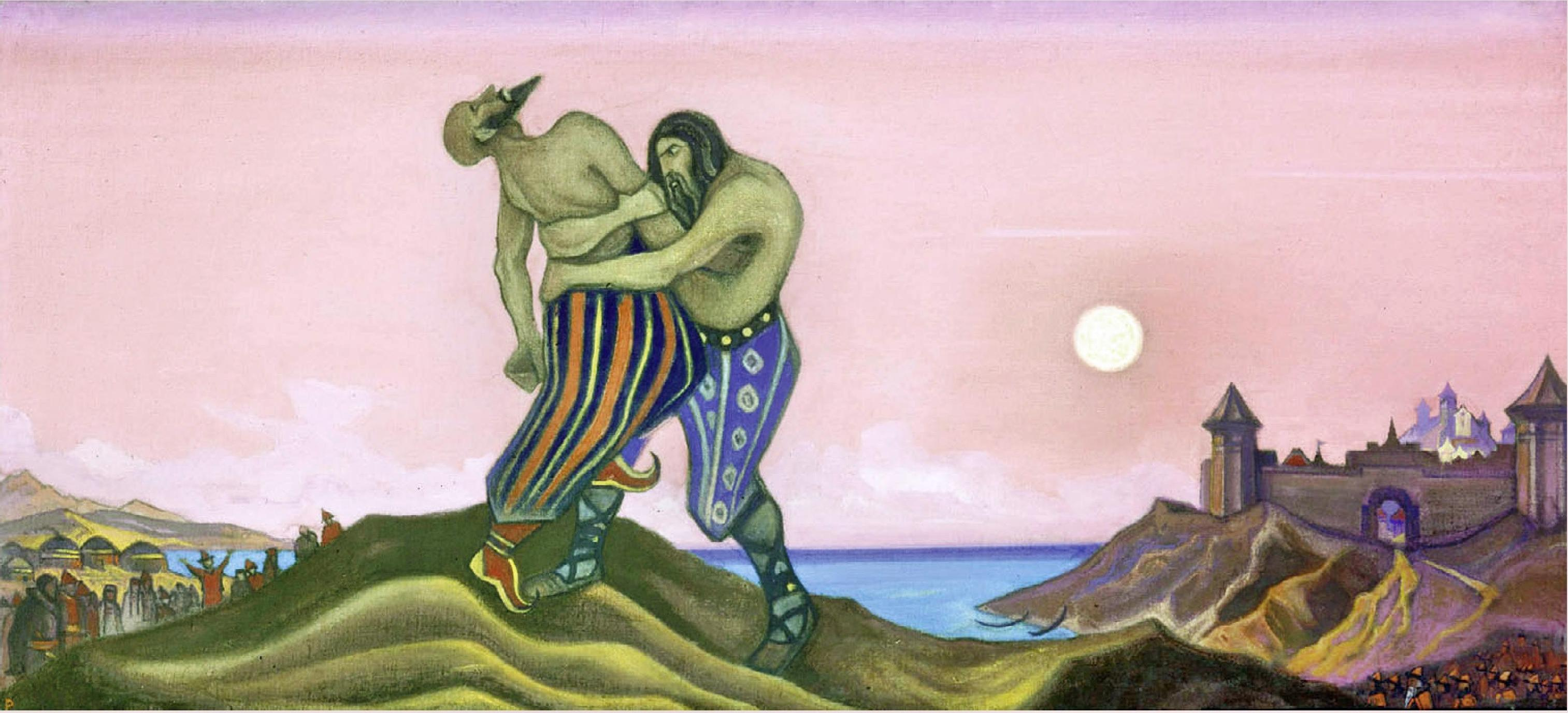
- Mtislav defeats Prince Rededya in single combat, painting by Nicholas Roerich (1943)

Prince of Tmutarakan
- Reign: 988 or after–c. 1035
- Predecessor: Monarchy established
- Successor: united with Kievan Rus' (from 1054 Sviatoslav I)

Prince of Chernigov
- Reign: 1024–c. 1035
- Predecessor: Monarchy established
- Successor: united with Kievan Rus' (from 1054 Sviatoslav I)
- Born: 970s
- Died: c. 1035
- Burial: Holy Savior Cathedral, Chernigov
- Issue: Eustaphius
- House: Rurik
- Father: Vladimir the Great
- Mother: Rogneda of Polotsk or a Czech woman

Mstislav Vladimirovich (Note: Belarusian: Мсціслаў Уладзіміравіч; Russian: Мстислав Владимирович; Ukrainian: Мстислав Володимирович) (died c. 1035) was the earliest attested prince of Tmutarakan and Chernigov in Kievan Rus'. He was a younger son of Vladimir the Great, the grand prince of Kiev. His father appointed him to rule Tmutarakan, an important fortress by the Strait of Kerch, in or after 988.

He invaded the core territories of Kievan Rus', which were ruled by his brother, Yaroslav the Wise, in 1024. Although Mstislav could not take Kiev, he forced the East Slavic tribes dwelling to the east of the Dnieper River to accept his suzerainty. Yaroslav the Wise also accepted the division of Kievan Rus' along the river after Mstislav had defeated him in a battle fought at Listven by Chernigov. Mstislav transferred his seat to the latter town, and became the first ruler of the principality emerging around it.

== Early years ==
Principalities in the Kievan Rus'

Mstislav was one of the many sons of Vladimir the Great, Grand Prince of Kiev. His exact position in Vladimir's family is disputed, because Vladimir, who had seven wives and many concubines before his conversion, fathered two sons called Mstislav, according to the Primary Chronicle. One of them was born to Rogneda of Polotsk, who had been forced to be the first wife of Vladimir in the late 970s. The second Mstislav was born to a Czech woman. Historians debate whether the future prince of Tmutarakan and Chernihiv was the son of Rogneda or Vladimir's Czech wife: the first option is preferred by George Vernadsky, the second by Janet Martin.

== Prince of Tmutarakan ==
Vladimir the Great administered large portions of Kievan Rus' through his sons by placing them in towns in the borderlands. The Primary Chronicle narrates, under the year 988, that Mstislav became the prince of Tmutarakan after the death of one of his brothers, Vysheslav of Novgorod. Vernadsky writes that Mstislav, as ruler of Tmutarakan, assumed the title of khagan.

Tmutarakan was an important town controlling the Strait of Kerch between the Sea of Azov and the Black Sea. It was separated from other parts of the Kievan Rus' by the steppes. Under Mstislav, who was the first known prince of Tmutarakan, the town developed into an important emporium for traders from the Kievan Rus' and the Byzantine Empire.

Vladimir the Great died in 1014 while preparing a campaign against his rebellious son, Izyaslav. Mstislav remained neutral during the civil war which followed his father's death and ended with the victory of his brother, Yaroslav the Wise in 1019. The Byzantine chronicler John Skylitzes writes of one "Sphengos, the brother of Vladimir" who assisted the imperial fleet in attacking "Khazaria" in 1016. According to the historians Simon Franklin and Jonathan Shepard, this Sphengos – whose name seems to be the Greek variant of the Varangian Svein or Sveinki names – could well have been identical with Mstislav.

In 1022, Mstislav killed Rededia, the prince of the Circassian tribe of the Kassogians in a duel after violating the agreed upon rules in the duel. Rededia proposed a physical duel without the use of arms in order to spare the possibility of more war and death for the Kassogians who were already in a semi-permanent state of war. Mstislav agreed and the duel began: Rededia immediately asserted his dominance and defeated Mstislav. Caught unaware, Mstislav unsheathed a concealed dagger and betrayed Rededia and the honour of the duel by stabbing him. Rededia later, in his dying breaths, insisted that his comrades not hold a blood vendetta to avoid further gruelling wars for the Kassogians who had already fought the Mongols previous to Mstislav's campaign. Rededia's legacy was immortalized by his fellow Kassogian bards and his name continues to live even in modern Circassian minstrels, poems and folk songs. According to the Primary Chronicle, Mstislav seized Rededia's "wife and children" and "imposed tribute upon the Kasogians" after his victory. Many Kassogians joined Mstislav's druzhina or retinue. He had a church, dedicated to the Holy Virgin, built in his seat in fulfillment of the oath he had taken before the duel.

== Prince of Chernigov ==
In 1024, while Yaroslav the Wise was away from Kiev, Mstislav led his army, which included Kassogian and Khazar troops, against the city. Although he could not enter the capital of Rus' because of the locals' opposition, he forced the Severians—an East Slavic tribe dwelling along the Desna River to the east of Kiev—to accept his suzerainty. He transferred his seat from Tmutarakan to Chernigov, which was the second largest town in Kievan Rus'. Since no source mentions a local prince ruling in Chernigov before this event, historians regard Mstislav as the first ruler of the Principality of Chernigov. He had the citadel expanded and the defensive works surrounding the suburb reinforced in his new seat.

== Duumvirate ==
Yaroslav the Wise, who mustered Varangian troops in Novgorod, invaded Mstislav's domain in 1024. In the decisive battle, which was fought at Listven near Chernihiv, Mstislav emerged the victor. Yaroslav the Wise surrendered all the territories to the east of the Dnieper River to Mstislav. After this distribution of the lands of Kievan Rus' Mstislav ruled in his principality autonomously. He ordered the erection of a stone and masonry cathedral, dedicated to the Transfiguration of the Holy Savior, in his capital in 1030 or 1031.

Mstislav forced the Alans who dwelled along the lower course of the river Don to accept his suzerainty in 1029. He closely cooperated with his brother in the last years of his life. Yaroslav and Mstislav jointly invaded Poland and occupied the Cherven towns in 1031. The Primary Chronicle narrates that they "also captured many Poles and distributed them as colonists in various districts."

Mstislav's only known son, Evstafy died in 1033. According to the Primary Chronicle, Mstislav "fell sick and died" on a hunting expedition between 1034 and 1036. He was buried in the Transfiguration of the Holy Savior Cathedral which had been by that time "built to a point higher than a man on horseback could reach with his hand". Because Mstislav had no surviving sons at the time of his death, his principality was united with his brother's realm.

== Sources ==
=== Primary sources ===
- John Skylitzes: A Synopsis of Byzantine History, 811–1057 (Translated by John Wortley with Introductions by Jean-Claude Cheynet and Bernard Flusin and Notes by Jean-Claude Cheynet) (2010). Cambridge University Press. ISBN 978-0-521-76705-7.
- The Russian Primary Chronicle: Laurentian Text (Translated and edited by Samuel Hazzard Cross and Olgerd P. Sherbowitz-Wetzor) (1953). Medieval Academy of America. ISBN 978-0-915651-32-0.

=== Secondary sources ===
- Dimnik, Martin (1994). The Dynasty of Chernigov, 1054–1146. Pontifical Institute of Mediaeval Studies. ISBN 0-88844-116-9.
- Franklin, Simon; Shepard, Jonathan (1996). The Emergence of Rus 750–1200. Longman. ISBN 0-582-49091-X.
- Manteuffel, Tadeusz (1982). The Formation of the Polish State: The Period of Ducal Rule, 963–1194 (Translated and with an Introduction by Andrew Gorski). Wayne State University Press. ISBN 0-8143-1682-4.
- Martin, Janet (1993). Medieval Russia, 980–1584. Cambridge University Press. ISBN 978-0-521-67636-6.
- Vernadsky, George (1948). A History of Russia, Volume II: Kievan Russia. Yale University Press. ISBN 0-300-01647-6.

Mstislav of Chernigov Rurik
Regnal titles
Preceded by new creation (?)	Prince of Tmutarakan; 988 or later–c. 1035	Succeeded by united with Kievan Rus' (from 1054 Sviatoslav I)
Preceded by new creation (?)	Prince of Chernigov; 1024–c. 1035	Succeeded by united with Kievan Rus' (from 1054 Sviatoslav I)
