= Alta (river) =

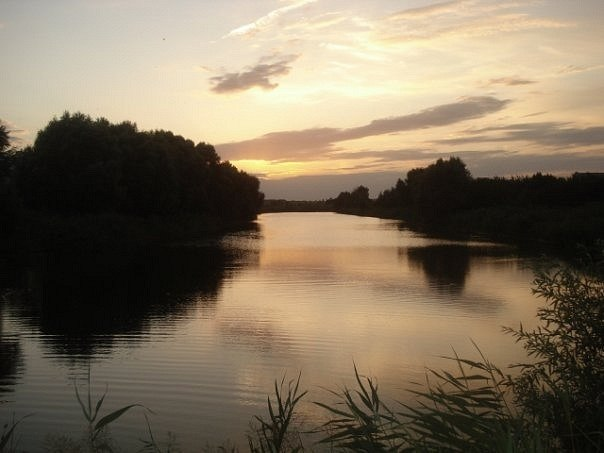

Location
- Country: Ukraine
- Location: Kyiv Oblast

Physical characteristics
- Source
  - location: Brovary Raion, Ukraine
- Mouth: Trubizh
  - coordinates: 50°3′51″N 31°27′41″E
- Length: 46 km (29 mi)
- Basin size: 492 km^{2} (190 sq mi)

Basin features
- Progression: Trubizh→ Dnieper→ Dnieper–Bug estuary→ Black Sea

Alta River (Ukrainian: Альта, Ільтиця, Alta, Iltytsia) is a small river in Ukraine and is a right tributary of the Trubizh. The ancient town of Pereiaslav is situated between the Trubizh and Alta rivers.

The river is considered the place where the assassins sent by Sviatopolk the Accursed killed saints Boris and Gleb in 1015. In 1019 it was the site of a battle between Svyatopolk and his brother Yaroslav I the Wise which Yaroslav won.

In 1068 the river was the place where Iziaslav I of Kyiv was defeated by Polovtsy at the Battle of the Alta River

On 25 May 1630 on the river near Pereiaslav was the place where Polish hetman Stanisław Koniecpolski was beaten by the Zaporozhian Cossacks led by Taras Triasylo. The battle is known as the Taras Night and is described in the Taras Shevchenko poem Tarasova nich .
