= Oleg I of Chernigov =

Prince in Kievan Rus' (d. 1115)

- Prince of Chernigov; Prince of Novgorod-Seversk
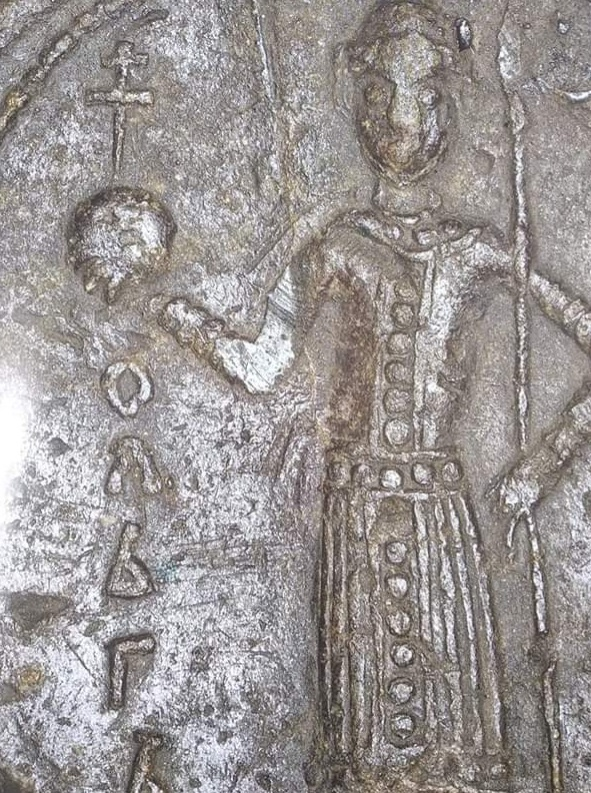
- The image of Prince Oleg Svyatoslavich ("Gorislavich") on a princely coin.

Prince of Chernigov
- Reign: 1094–1097
- Predecessor: Vladimir II Monomakh
- Successor: Davyd Sviatoslavich
- Born: c. 1052
- Died: 1 August 1115 (aged 62 or 63)
- Spouse: 1. Theophano Mouzalonissa; 2. Maria Yuryevna, daughter of Yuri I Vladimirovich Dolgoruky and Aëpovna, Princess of the Kumans, who is the daughter of Aëpa II Ocenevich, Khan of the Cumans and Okand.
- Issue: Vsevolod II of Kiev; Igor II of Kiev; Maria; Gleb; Sviatoslav Olgovich
Names
- Oleg Sviatoslavich
- House: Olgovichi
- Father: Sviatoslav Yaroslavich
- Mother: Killikiya

Oleg Svyatoslavich (Russian and Ukrainian: Олег Святославич; c. 1052 – 1 August 1115), nicknamed Gorislavich (Гориславич, literally "of famous woe") was a prince from Kievan Rus' whose equivocal adventures ignited political unrest in the country at the turn of the 11th and 12th centuries. He reigned as Prince of Chernigov from 1094 to 1097, and as Prince of Novgorod-Seversk from 1097 to 1115. He was the progenitor of the Olgovichi family.

== Early life and family ==
Oleg was a younger son of Sviatoslav Iaroslavich, Prince of Chernigov and his first wife, Killikiya. He might have been either the second or the fourth among the four sons of Sviatoslav Iaroslavich by Killikiya, because their order of seniority is uncertain. According to historian Martin Dimnik, Oleg was born around 1050. Oleg was named after his grand uncle. His baptismal name was Michael. The Tale of Igor's Campaign styles him Gorislavich, poetically deriving his patronymic from the Russian word for sorrow. His descendants, known as Olgovichi, (Note: The first time the Olgovichi are mentioned in primary sources is in the Hypatian Codex continuation of the Primary Chronicle under the year 6624 (1116): 'Volodimer' [Monomakh] then, trusting in God and justice, went to Smolensk with his sons, and with Davyd Sviatoslavich, and [with] the Olgovichi.' Scholars have noted that 'Smolensk' should read 'Minsk'.) were archrivals of Vladimir's descendants (known as Monomakhovichi) in their struggle for supremacy in Rus'.

Oleg's children were:

- Vsevolod II of Kiev
- Igor II of Kiev
- Maria
- Gleb
- Sviatoslav Olgovich.

== Military career ==
Dimnik writes that "it is highly probable" that Oleg succeeded his brother, Gleb in Tmutarakan after their father appointed the latter Prince of Novgorod in about 1068. Oleg's father and uncle, Vsevolod Iaroslavich made an alliance against their elder brother, Iziaslav Iaroslavich, Grand Prince of Kiev and dethroned him on 22 March 1073. According to Dimnik, Oleg received the Principality of Vladimir from his father who succeeded Iziaslav Iaroslavich in Kiev. In short, Oleg and his cousin, Vladimir Monomach—son of Vsevolod Iaroslavich—became close friends. Monomach writes in his Instruction that Oleg was the godfather of his eldest son, Mstislav. The two cousins together commanded the troops Oleg's father sent to assist Boleslav II of Poland in Bohemia in 1076, according to the Russian Primary Chronicle.

Sviatoslav Iaroslavich died in Kiev on 27 December 1077. He was succeeded by his brother, Vsevolod Iaroslavich. The new grand prince seems to have confirmed Oleg's rule in Vladimir, because no source makes mention of a conflict between them. However, the dethroned Iziaslav Iaroslavich—Vsevolod's brother and Oleg's uncle—returned with Polish reinforcements. Iziaslav and Vsevolod had a meeting where they reached an agreement: Vsevolod renounced of Kiev, but received Chernigov, the one-time domain of Oleg's father. Iziaslav marched in Kiev on 15 July 1077, while Oleg "was with Vsevolod at Chernigov", according to the Primary Chronicle. The chronicler's remark suggests that Oleg had by that time been forced to leave Vladimir.

Failing to get along with his uncle, on 10 April 1077 Oleg fled to his brother Roman who reigned in Tmutarakan. Together with his cousin, Boris Vyacheslavich, who had also settled in Tmutarakan, Oleg made an alliance with the Cumans and invaded Rus' in the summer of 1078. They routed their uncle, Vsevolod on the Sozh River and entered Chernigov on 25 August. The Russian Primary Chronicle accuses Oleg and Boris of being the first to lead "the pagans to attack the land of Rus'". However, Vladimir Monomach, in his Instruction, reveals that he and his father, Vsevolod had hired Cumans when attacking Polotsk in the previous year.

Expelled from Chernigov, Vsevolod fled to Kiev and sought assistance from his brother, Iziaslav. They united their forces and marched against Chernigov. Although Oleg and Boris were not in the town when their uncles arrived, the citizens decided to resist. Oleg was willing to start negotiations with his uncles, but Boris refused his proposal. The decisive battle was fought "at a place near a village on the meadow of Nezhata" on 3 October.

He was defeated and escaped to Tmutarakan, where the Khazars had him imprisoned and sent in chains to Constantinople. The emperor, who was a relative and ally of Vsevolod, exiled him to Rhodes. There he married a noble lady, Theophano Mouzalonissa, who bore him several children.

== Chernigov war of succession ==
Four years later, sources again find him active in Tmutarakan, where he adopted the title "archon of Khazaria". There ensued a prolonged internecine struggle with his cousins Sviatopolk II Iziaslavich and Vladimir II Monomakh. The war broke out due to the death (13 April 1093) of Vsevolod I Yaroslavich, grand prince of Kiev, and prince of Chernigov and Pereyaslavl. Sviatopolk inherited the throne of Kiev as the eldest son of the senior branch; all parties accepted his accession, but they disagreed which branch would succeed him.

The three warring factions were related dynastic princely branches, each descended from three sons of Yaroslav the Wise, and each of whom had reigned as grand prince of Kiev:

- Iziaslavichi, descended from Iziaslav I (r. 1054–1073; 1076–1078)
  - (Kievan Rus') Sviatopolk II Iziaslavich of Kiev.
- Monomakhovichi: descended from Vsevolod I (r. 1078–1093)
  - Vladimir II Monomakh of Pereyaslavl
  - Izyaslav Vladimirovich of Murom
- Sviatoslavichi: descended from Sviatoslav (r. 1073–1076; legitimacy disputed)
  - Oleg I Sviatoslavich of Chernigov
  - Davyd Sviatoslavich of Smolensk

While he was still alive, Vsevolod had appointed his son Vladimir Monomakh as governor over Chernigov, while the Sviatoslavichi probably still controlled the eastern half of Chernigov centred around Murom (split off as the Principality of Murom decades later). Although Oleg's father Sviatoslav II had reigned as grand prince of Kiev from 1073 until his death in 1076, he had seized power out of order by driving out his brother Iziaslav I. However, the latter regained the Kievan throne from 1076 until his death in 1078, to be succeeded by their youngest brother Vsevolod. While Sviatoslav's sons, the Sviatoslavichi (including Oleg), considered their father's reign to have been legitimate, Vsevolod's son Vladimir Monomakh regarded it as illegitimate. Upon Vsevolod's death, Monomakh therefore refused to hand over Chernigov to the sons of Sviatoslav II of Kiev, and even appointed his own son to govern Murom.

Oleg decided to aggressively press his claim to Chernigov, and in 1094, he returned from Tmutarakan with an armed force of Kipchaks to Rus', drove out Monomakh and captured Chernigov. While Monomakh resettled in Pereyaslavl, his sons still controlled eastern Chernigovia, including Murom on the river Oka, resisting Oleg. A 1096 campaign by Oleg succeeded in killing Monomakh's son Iziaslav in Murom, but when he invaded Rostov-Suzdal (a Pereyaslavl possession), he was pushed back to Murom by Monomakh's other son Mstislav.

The war ended with a compromise agreement at the 1097 Council of Liubech.

== Reign in Chernigov ==
One of the most prominent princes of Kievan period who never attained the Kievan throne, he died on 1 August 1115, and was buried in Chernigov.

== Legacy ==
The Tale of Igor's Campaign criticized Oleg for contributing to the escalation of internal strife between Rurikid princes, as well as for his alliance with Cumans, who plundered the southern regions of Rus', which resulted in his monicker "Gorislavich" (from Old East Slavic горе - "woe").

== Bibliography ==
=== Primary sources ===
- Cross, Samuel Hazzard; Sherbowitz-Wetzor, Olgerd P. (1953) [1930]. The Russian Primary Chronicle, Laurentian Text. Translated and edited by Samuel Hazzard Cross and Olgerd P. Sherbowitz-Wetzor (PDF). Cambridge, Massachusetts: The Mediaeval Academy of America. p. 325.
- Thuis, Hans (2015). Nestorkroniek. De oudste geschiedenis van het Kievse Rijk [Nestor Chronicle: the oldest history of the Kievan Realm] (in Dutch). Nijmegen: Uitgeverij Vantilt. p. 304. ISBN 9789460042287.

=== Literature ===
- Dimnik, Martin (1994). The Dynasty of Chernigov, 1054–1146. Pontifical Institute of Mediaeval Studies. ISBN 0-88844-116-9.
- Franklin, Simon; Shepard, Jonathan (1996). The Emergence of Rus 750–1200. Longman. ISBN 0-582-49091-X.
- Martin, Janet (1993). Medieval Russia, 980–1584. Cambridge University Press. ISBN 978-0-521-67636-6.
- Martin, Janet (2007). Medieval Russia: 980–1584. Second Edition. E-book. Cambridge: Cambridge University Press. ISBN 978-0-511-36800-4.
- Raffensperger, Christian (2012). Reimagining Europe: Kievan Rus' in the Medieval World. Harvard University Press. ISBN 978-0-674-06384-6.
- Vernadsky, George (1948). A History of Russia, Volume II: Kievan Russia. Yale University Press. ISBN 0-300-01647-6.
