= Battle of the Alta River =

Battle in 1068 in present-day Ukraine

- Part of the Rus'–Cuman wars
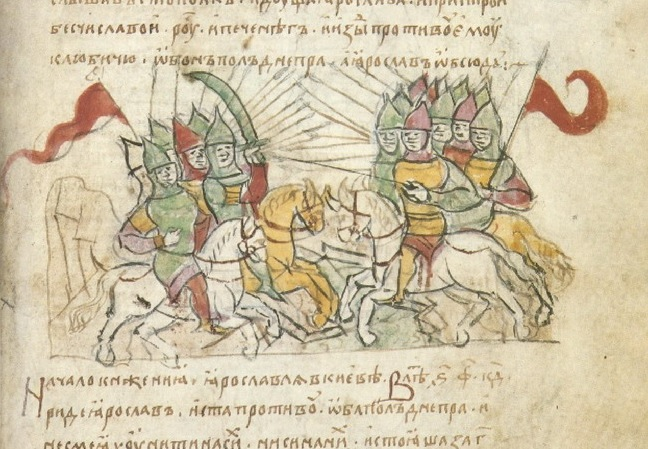
- The Battle of the Alta River between the Russian princes—sons of Yaroslav the Wise—and the Polovtsian army, 1068; illustration from the Radziwiłł Chronicle, XV century
Date	1068
Location	Alta River 50°03′00″N 31°26′00″E
Result	Cuman victory

Belligerents
Cuman–Kipchak confederation	Kievan Rus'

Commanders and leaders
Khan Sharukan	Grand Prince Iziaslav I of Kiev; Prince Sviatoslav of Chernigov; Prince Vsevolod of Periaslavl
- Location within Ukraine Battle of the Alta River (European Russia)

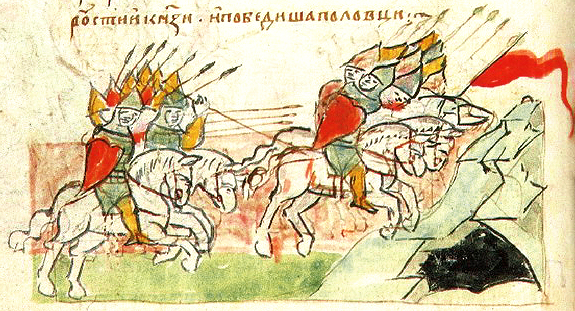
The Battle of the Alta River in 1068, as illustrated in the Radzivill Chronicle.

The Battle of Alta River was a 1068 clash on the Alta River between Cuman army on the one hand and Kievan Rus' forces of Grand Prince Iziaslav I of Kiev, Prince Sviatoslav of Chernigov, and Prince Vsevolod of Periaslavl on the other in which the Rus' forces were routed and fled back to Kiev and Chernigov in some disarray. The battle led to an uprising in Kiev that briefly deposed Grand Prince Iziaslav. That incident supposedly shows the power of the Kiev veche and how common people gathering influenced princely politics in Kievan Rus' (particularly in Kiev as well as in the Novgorod the Great).

== History ==
The Cumans/Polovtsy/Kipchaks were first mentioned in the Primary Chronicle as Polovtsy sometime around 1055, when Prince Vsevolod drew up a peace treaty with them. In spite of the treaty, in 1061, Kipchaks supposedly breached the earthworks and palisades constructed by Princes Vladimir (d. 1015) and Yaroslav (d. 1054) and defeated an army led by Prince Vsevolod that had marched out to intercept them. Following the unsuccessful Battle on the Alta River near the city of Pereiaslavl, Iziaslav and Vsevolod fled back to Kiev and their unwillingness to arm the general populace to march out and fight the raiders led to an uprising in the city. A veche (public assembly) was convened on unknown initiative in the marketplace and the people there demanded arms to fight the Kipchaks. When these were not forthcoming, they ransacked the house of voivode Konstantin. The Kievans freed Prince Vseslav of Polotsk, who had been imprisoned earlier by Iziaslav, Vsevolod, and Sviatoslav, and placed him on the Kievan throne in hopes that he could stop Kipchaks. Iziaslav, for his part, fled to his father-in-law, Boleslaw II of Poland, who provided him a military support with which Iziaslav returned to Kiev the following May (1069) and took back the throne.

In Iziaslav's absence, Prince Sviatoslav managed to defeat a much larger Cuman army on November 1, 1068 and stem the tide of Cuman raids. A small skirmish in 1071 was the only disturbance by the Cumans for the next two decades. Thus, while the Battle of Alta River was a disgrace for Kievan Rus', Sviatoslav's victory the following year relieved the Cumans' threat to Kiev and Chernigov for a considerable period.

== See also ==
- Battle of the Stugna River
- Lay of Igor's Campaign
- Cuman people
- Kipchaks
