= Mandgelis Document =

The Mandgelis Document or Mandgelis Letter was a letter in Hebrew dated AM 4746 (985–986). It refers to "our lord David, the Khazar prince" who lived in Taman. The letter said that this David was visited by envoys from Kievan Rus to ask about religious matters. This consultation may have been connected to the conversion of Vladimir I of Kiev which took place during roughly the same time period. Taman was a principality of Kievan Rus around 988, so this successor state (if that is what it was) may have been conquered altogether. The authenticity of this letter has however been questioned by such scholars as D. M. Dunlop, Dan Shapira, Malachi Beit-Arié, Kevin Brook, and Michael Toch as it passed through the hands of Abraham Firkovich, who is known to have forged documents and inscriptions on occasion.
