= Oda of Stade =

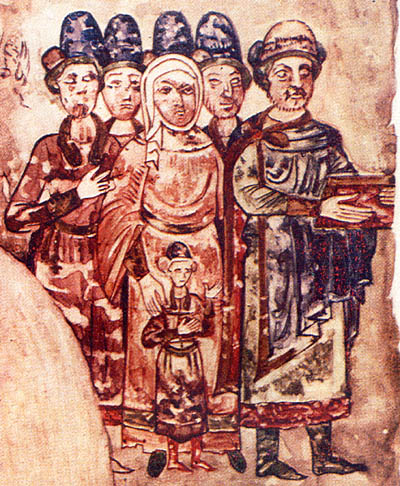
- A portrait commissioned in 1073 by Sviatoslav II of Kiev (on right) of Oda of Stade, their young son, Yaroslav, and Sviatoslav’s four sons from a previous marriage

Grand Princess consort of Kievan Rus'
- Tenure: 1073–1077
- Born: 1040
- Died: 1087 (aged 46–47)
- Spouse: Sviatoslav II of Kiev
- Issue: Yaroslav of Murom; Akarina/Aliarina
- Father: Lippold/Liudolf of Derlingau or Dedi of Saxony
- Mother: Ida of Elsdorf

Oda of Stade (also Oda of Elsdorf) (b. 1040 – d. 1087) was a noblewoman, who was the daughter of Ida of Elsdorf. Through marriage to Sviatoslav II of Kiev, she became a Grand Princess consort of Kievan Rus'.

== Family ==
Oda's mother was Ida of Eldsorf (d.1052), daughter of Liudolf, Margrave of Frisia and sister of Matilda of Frisia. Ida was also a niece of Pope Leo IX, a granddaughter of Gisela of Swabia, and thus a niece of Emperor Henry III of Germany. Oda's father was perhaps Ida's first husband, Lippold/Liudolf of Derlingau (d.1038), or he may have been Ida's second husband, Dedi of Saxony (d.1056).

== Religious life ==
According to the thirteenth-century chronicler Albert of Stade, before her marriage, Oda was a nun in the monastery of Rinthelen. The location of this monastery is not known, but is thought to have been Ringelheim. In order to have Oda released from the monastery, her mother Ida granted Villa Stedenthorp near Heßlingen to Rinthelen.

== Marriages and children ==
Around 1065, however, Oda left the monastery and married Sviatoslav II of Kiev, as his second wife. According to the eleventh-century chronicler Lampert of Hersfeld, Oda's brother, Burchard, provost of St Simeon in Trier (d.1086), was sent to Rus’ to arrange the marriage. According to Albert of Stade, this was done at the instigation of Oda's mother Ida. Around 1070 Oda gave birth to Sviatoslav's fifth son, Yaroslav (also known as Constantin), who later became prince of Murom (r.1097-1123, 1127–1129) and Chernigov (r.1123-1127). After Sviatoslav's death (d.1076), Oda returned to the Holy Roman Empire with her son, where she raised him.

Oda is believed to have arranged the marriage of her niece Eupraxia of Kiev to Henry III the Long, Count of Stade.

By her second marriage, to an unknown Saxon nobleman, Oda had a daughter: Akarina of Elsdorf (1079-1130) (whom Albert of Stade refers to as Aliarina), who was the mother of Burchard of Loccum.

== Primary sources ==
- Albert of Stade, Annales Stadenses, ed. J. Lappenberg, MGH SS 16 (Hannover, 1859, pp. 283-378
- Lampert of Hersfeld, Annales, ed., O. Holder-Egger, MGH SS rer Germ 38 (Hannover and Leipzig, 1894).

== Secondary sources ==
- R-H. Bautier, ‘Anne de Kiev, reine de France, et la politique royale au XIe siècle: étude critique de la documentation,’ Revue des Études Slaves 57:4 (1985), 539–564.
- R. Bloch, ‘Verwandtschaftliche Beziehungen des sächsischen Adels zum russischen Fürstenhause im XI. Jahrhundert,’ in L. Santifaller, ed., Festschrift Albert Brackmann (Weimar, 1931), pp. 185–206.
- M. Dimnik, The Dynasty of Chernigov, 1054–1146 (Pontifical Institute of Mediaeval Studies, 1994).
- E. Hlawitschka, Untersuchungen zu den Thronwechseln der ersten Hälfte des 11. Jahrhunderts und zur Adelsgeschichte Süddeutschlands. Zugleich klärende Forschungen um "Kuno von Öhningen" (Sigmaringen, 1987).
- R. Hucke, Die Grafen von Stade 990-1144 (Stade, 1956).
- D.C. Jackman, Canes palatini: Dynastic Transplantation and the Cult of St. Simeon (Editions Enlaplage, 2010).
- C. Raffensperger, Reimagining Europe: Kievan Rus' in the Medieval World (Harvard University Press, 2012).
- T. Zajac, 'Marriage Impediments in Canon Law and Practice: Consanguinity Regulations and the Case of Orthodox-Catholic Intermarriage in Kyivan Rus, ca. 1000 – 1250,' in Proceedings of the Fourteenth International Congress of Medieval Canon Law, Toronto, 5–11 August 2012, ed. Joseph Goering, Stephan Dusil, and Andreas Thier (Vatican City, 2016), pp. 711–29.
