= Sviatoslav II of Kiev =

Grand Prince of Kiev from 1073 to 1076

Sviatoslav II
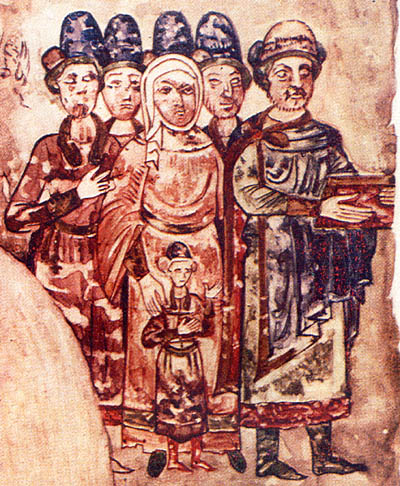
- Sviatoslav (far right) with his family, 1073

Prince of Volhynia
- Reign: c. 1040–1054

Prince of Chernigov
- Reign: 1054–1076
- Predecessor: Mstislav of Chernigov (1035)
- Successor: Vsevolod I of Kiev

Grand Prince of Kiev
- Reign: 1073–1076
- Predecessor: Iziaslav I
- Successor: Vsevolod I
- Born: 1027
- Died: 27 December 1076 (aged 48–49); Kiev
- Burial: Transfiguration Cathedral, Chernigov
- Wives: Killikiya or Kelikia (Cecilia); Oda of Stade
- Issue: Vysheslava; Gleb; Oleg; Davyd; Roman; Yaroslav (Murom)
- House: Vladimir the Great; Sviatoslavichi
- Father: Yaroslav the Wise
- Mother: Ingegerd of Sweden

Sviatoslav II Iaroslavich or Sviatoslav II Yaroslavich (Old East Slavic: Ст҃ославь Ӕрославичь; (Note: Russian and Ukrainian: Святослав Ярославич) 1027 – 27 December 1076) was Grand Prince of Kiev from 1073 until his death in 1076. He was a younger son of Yaroslav the Wise, the grand prince of Kiev. He is the progenitor of the Sviatoslavichi branch of Rurikids.

He ruled the Principality of Vladimir in Volhynia in his father's lifetime (from around 1040 to 1054). Yaroslav the Wise, who divided the Kievan Rus' among his five sons in his testament, willed the Principality of Chernigov to Sviatoslav. Sviatoslav joined his brothers, Iziaslav of Kiev and Vsevolod of Pereyaslav, in forming a princely "triumvirate" that oversaw the affairs of Kievan Rus' until 1072. The three brothers together fought against their enemies, including the nomadic Oghuz Turks, and their distant relative, Prince Vseslav of Polotsk. The Cumans defeated their united force in the autumn of 1068, but Sviatoslav routed a Cuman band plundering his principality.

The "triumvirate" broke up, when Sviatoslav, supported by his younger brother Vsevolod, dethroned and replaced their older brother Iziaslav in 1073. He commissioned the compilation of at least two miscellanies of theological works. Otherwise, his short reign was uneventful.

== Early life ==
Sviatoslav was the fourth son of Yaroslav the Wise, Grand Prince of Kiev, and his wife, Ingegerd of Sweden. He was born in 1027. The Lyubetskiy sinodik—a list of the princes of Chernigov which was completed in the Monastery of Saint Anthony in Lyubech—writes that his baptismal name was Nicholas.

The Russian Primary Chronicle writes that Sviatoslav was staying "at Vladimir" in Volhynia around the time his father fell seriously ill before his death. According to the historian Martin Dimnik, the chronicle's report shows that Yaroslav the Wise had, most probably in about 1040, appointed Sviatoslav to rule this important town of the Kievan Rus'.

On his deathbed, Yaroslav the Wise divided the most important towns of his realm among his five sons—Iziaslav, Sviatoslav, Vsevolod, Igor, and Vyacheslav—who survived him. To Sviatoslav, he bequeathed Chernigov. The dying grand prince also ordered that his four younger sons should "heed" their eldest brother, Iziaslav, who received Kiev.

== Triumvirate ==
Principalities in the Kievan Rus' (1054–1132)

Yaroslav the Wise died on 20 February 1054. His three elder sons—Iziaslav of Kiev, Sviatoslav of Chernigov, and Vsevolod of Pereyaslav—decided to jointly govern the Kievan Rus'. Historian Martin Dimnik writes that taking into account Sviatoslav's political and military skills it "is reasonable to assume that he was one of the main motivating forces, if not the actual architect, of many of the policies adopted" by the three brothers. The "triumviri" closely cooperated in the following years. In 1059 they liberated their uncle Sudislav, whom their father had sent to prison around 1035. They made a joint expedition "by horse and ship against the Torks" or Oghuz Turks, according to the Russian Primary Chronicle, in 1060. On hearing of the arrival of the Rus' forces, the Torks fled from their lands without resistance.

In 1065, Sviatoslav led his troops against his nephew, Rostislav Vladimirovich, who had in the previous year forcibly expelled Sviatoslav's son, Gleb, from Tmutorakan. Upon Sviatoslav's arrival, Rostislav withdrew from this important center of his uncle's domains, but he reoccupied it after Sviatoslav had returned to Chernigov. A distant cousin of the "triumviri", Vseslav Briacheslavich (Prince of Polotsk), attacked Pskov in 1065, according to The Chronicle of Pskov. Vseslav Briacheslavich could not take this town, but he seized and plundered Novgorod—which had been ruled by Iziaslav of Kiev's son, Mstislav—in the next winter. Izyaslav, Sviatoslav and Vsevolod soon united their forces and set forth against Vseslav, "though it was the dead of winter", according to the Russian Primary Chronicle. They routed Vseslav's army by the Nemiga River (near Minsk) on 3 March 1066. Vseslav, who fled from the battlefield, agreed to enter into negotiations with the "triumviri", but they treacherously captured him at a meeting at Orsha in early June.

The Cumans, who had emerged as the dominant power of the Pontic steppes in the early 1060s, invaded the southern regions of Kievan Rus' in 1068. The three brothers together marched against the invaders, but the Cumans routed them on the Alta River. From the battlefield, Sviatoslav withdrew to Chernigov and regrouped his troops. He returned to defeat the Cumans with a smaller force at the town of Snovsk on 1 November at the Battle of Snovsk, thus enhancing his prestige among the populace. In the meantime, the townspeople of Kiev had dethroned and expelled Sviatoslav's brother, Iziaslav. Taking advantage of Iziaslav's absence, Sviatoslav sent his own son, Gleb, to Novgorod to rule the town.

Iziaslav returned at the head of Polish reinforcements. The townspeople of Kiev sent messages to Sviatoslav and Vsevolod, imploring them to come to their "father's city" and defend it, according to the Russian Primary Chronicle. Sviatoslav and Vsevolod requested Iziaslav "not to lead the Poles in attack upon Kiev", stating that "if he intended to nurse his wrath and destroy the city, they would be properly concerned for the ancestral capital". Iziaslav partially acquiesced: he did not let his Polish allies enter the town, but his retinue slaughtered or mutilated many of his opponents in Kiev. He also attempted to punish Anthony—the founder of the Monastery of the Caves in Kiev—who had supported his enemies, but Sviatoslav gave shelter to the saintly monk in Chernigov.

With Iziaslav's return to Kiev, the "triumvirate" was restored. The three brothers together visited Vyshhorod in order to participate in the translation of the relics of their saintly uncles, Boris and Gleb, on 3 May 1072. According to The Narrative, Passion, and Encomium of Boris and Gleb, Sviatoslav took Saint Gleb's hand and "pressed it to his injury, for he had pain in his neck, and to his eyes, and to his forehead" before placing it back into the coffin. In short order, Sviatoslav felt a pain at the top of his head and his servant found a fingernail of the saint under his cap. Most historians agree that the three brothers expanded their father's legal code on this occasion, but the exact date is unknown.

== Grand Prince of Kiev ==
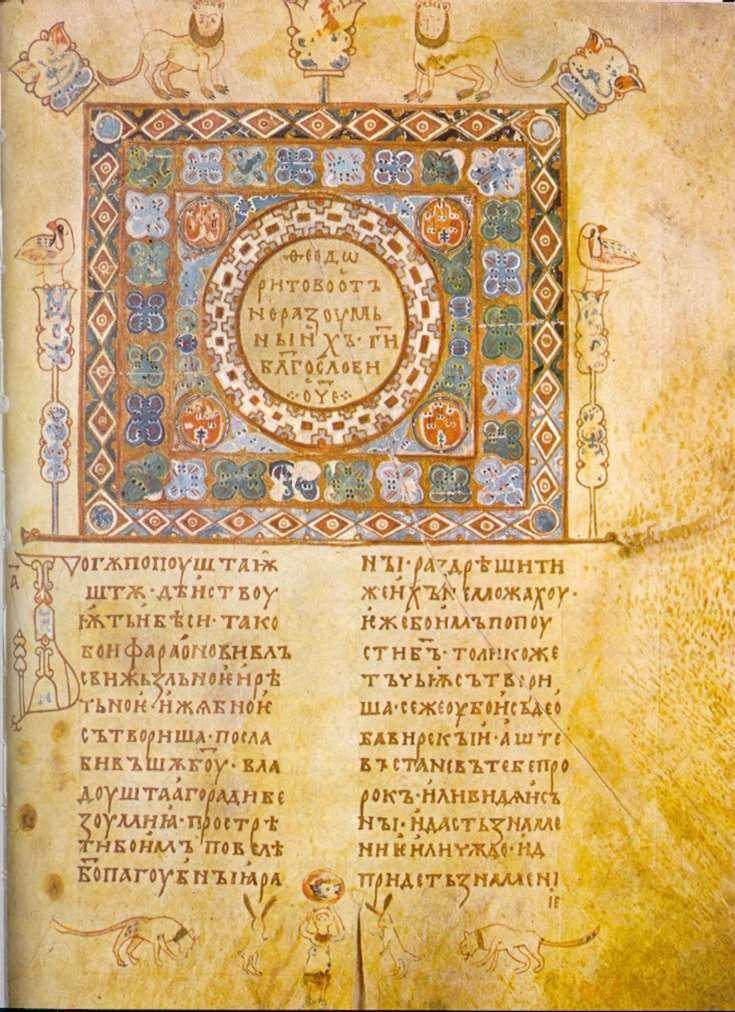
A page from Sviatoslav's Izbornik of 1073

According to the Primary Chronicle, "the devil stirred up strife" among the three brothers shortly after the canonization of Saints Boris and Gleb. Sviatoslav and Vsevolod united their forces and expelled Iziaslav from Kiev on 22 March 1073. The chronicler put the blame for this action on Sviatoslav, stating that "he was the instigator of his brother's expulsion, for he desired more power". The chronicler also states that Sviatoslav had "misled Vsevolod by asserting that" Iziaslav "was entering into an alliance" with Vseslav Briacheslavich against them. Modern historians disagree about the motives of Sviatoslav's action. Franklin and Shepard write that he was driven by "straightforward greed"; Martin says that Sviatoslav who seems to have suffered from a grave illness wanted to secure his sons' right to Kiev which would have been lost if Sviatoslav "had predeceased Iziaslav without having ruled" the town. In fact, the Primary Chronicle states that it was Sviatoslav who "ruled in Kiev after the expulsion" of Iziaslav.

Initially, the head of the Monastery of the Caves, Feodosy criticized Sviatoslav for usurping the throne. However, before his death in May 1074 he was reconciled with the grand prince, who supported the foundation of a stone church dedicated to the Mother of God in Kiev. Sviatoslav also supported the compilation of ecclesiastic works. Two izborniki or miscellanies—collections of excerpts from the Bible and from theological works—were completed under his auspices in 1073 and 1076. According to the Izbornik of 1073, Sviatoslav, who is praised as a "new Ptolemy", had by that time collected a great number of spiritual books.

Sviatoslav's rule was short and uneventful. His dethroned brother first fled to Poland, but Duke Bolesław II, who was Sviatoslav's son-in-law, expelled him from his lands. Next Iziaslav sought the assistance of the German monarch, Henry IV. The latter, in 1075, sent his envoys—including Sviatoslav's brother-in-law, Burchard—to Kiev to collect more information. According to the Primary Chronicle, "in his pride", Sviatoslav "showed them his riches", displaying them "the innumerable quantity of his gold, silver and silks". In 1076 Sviatoslav sent reinforcements to Poland to help his son-in-law against the Bohemians.

Sviatoslav died on 27 December 1076. The Primary Chronicle writes that "the cutting of a sore" caused his death. He was buried in the Holy Savior Cathedral in Chernigov. Within a year, his elder brother Iziaslav was restored and Sviatoslav's sons lost most parts of his domains.

== Ancestry ==
Ancestors of Sviatoslav II of Kiev

8. Sviatoslav I of Kiev
4. Vladimir the Great
9. Malusha
2. Yaroslav the Wise
5. Rogneda of Polotsk or Anna Porphyrogenita
1. Sviatoslav II of Kiev
12. Erik Segersäll
6. Olof Skötkonung
13. Sigríð Storråda or Świętosława
3. Ingegerd Olofsdotter of Sweden
7. Estrid of the Obotrites

According to the Lyubetskiy sinodik, Sviatoslav's wife was Killikiya or Kelikia (Cecilia). On the other hand, German chroniclers write that his wife was Oda of Stade, a sister of Burchard, the Provost of Trier, and she gave birth to one son. A portrait depicting Sviatoslav and his family in the Izbornik of 1073 shows that he had five sons and four of them were adults at the time their portrait was made. Based on these sources, Sviatoslav married twice.

According to Dimnik, Sviatoslav married his first wife, Killikiya, between 1043 and 1047. Their first child seems to have been a daughter, Vysheslava. Her eldest brother Gleb became prince of Tmutorakan and later of Novgorod. The second son of Sviatoslav and Killikiya was Oleg, the future prince of Chernigov. Davyd, the future prince of Novgorod and Chernigov, was born around 1051. Roman, who became prince of Tmutorakan, was born around 1052.

Sviatoslav married his second wife, Oda of Stade, in about 1065, according to Dimnik. Oda, the daughter of Lothair Udo I, Margrave of the Nordmark, was in some way related to Henry III, Holy Roman Emperor. She gave birth to Sviatoslav's fifth son, Yaroslav, who later became prince of Murom and Chernigov. After Sviatoslav's death, Oda and her son moved to the Holy Roman Empire.

== Sources ==
=== Primary sources ===
- The Russian Primary Chronicle: Laurentian Text (Translated and edited by Samuel Hazzard Cross and Olgerd P. Sherbowitz-Wetzor) (1953). Medieval Academy of America. ISBN 978-0-915651-32-0.
- "The Narrative, Passion, and Encomium of Boris and Gleb" In Kantor, Marvin (1983). Medieval Slavic Lives of Saints and Princes. University of Michigan. ISBN 0-930042-44-1.

=== Secondary sources ===
- Dimnik, Martin (1994). The Dynasty of Chernigov, 1054–1146. Pontifical Institute of Mediaeval Studies. ISBN 0-88844-116-9.
- Franklin, Simon; Shepard, Jonathan (1996). The Emergence of Rus 750–1200. Longman. ISBN 0-582-49091-X.
- Martin, Janet (1993). Medieval Russia, 980–1584. Cambridge University Press. ISBN 978-0-521-67636-6.
- Martin, Janet (2007). Medieval Russia: 980–1584. Second Edition. E-book. Cambridge: Cambridge University Press. ISBN 978-0-511-36800-4.
- Raffensperger, Christian (2012). Reimagining Europe: Kievan Rus' in the Medieval World. Harvard University Press. ISBN 978-0-674-06384-6.
- Vernadsky, George (1948). A History of Russia, Volume II: Kievan Russia. Yale University Press. ISBN 0-300-01647-6.

Sviatoslav II of Kiev Rurik; Sviatoslavichi Born: 1027 Died: 1077
Regnal titles
| Preceded by Mstislav as last known prince | Prince of Chernigov; 1054–1073 | Succeeded by Vsevolod I |
| Preceded by Iziaslav I | Grand Prince of Kiev; 1073–1077 | Succeeded by Vsevolod I |
