= Tmutarakan =

Former human settlement

- Hermonassa
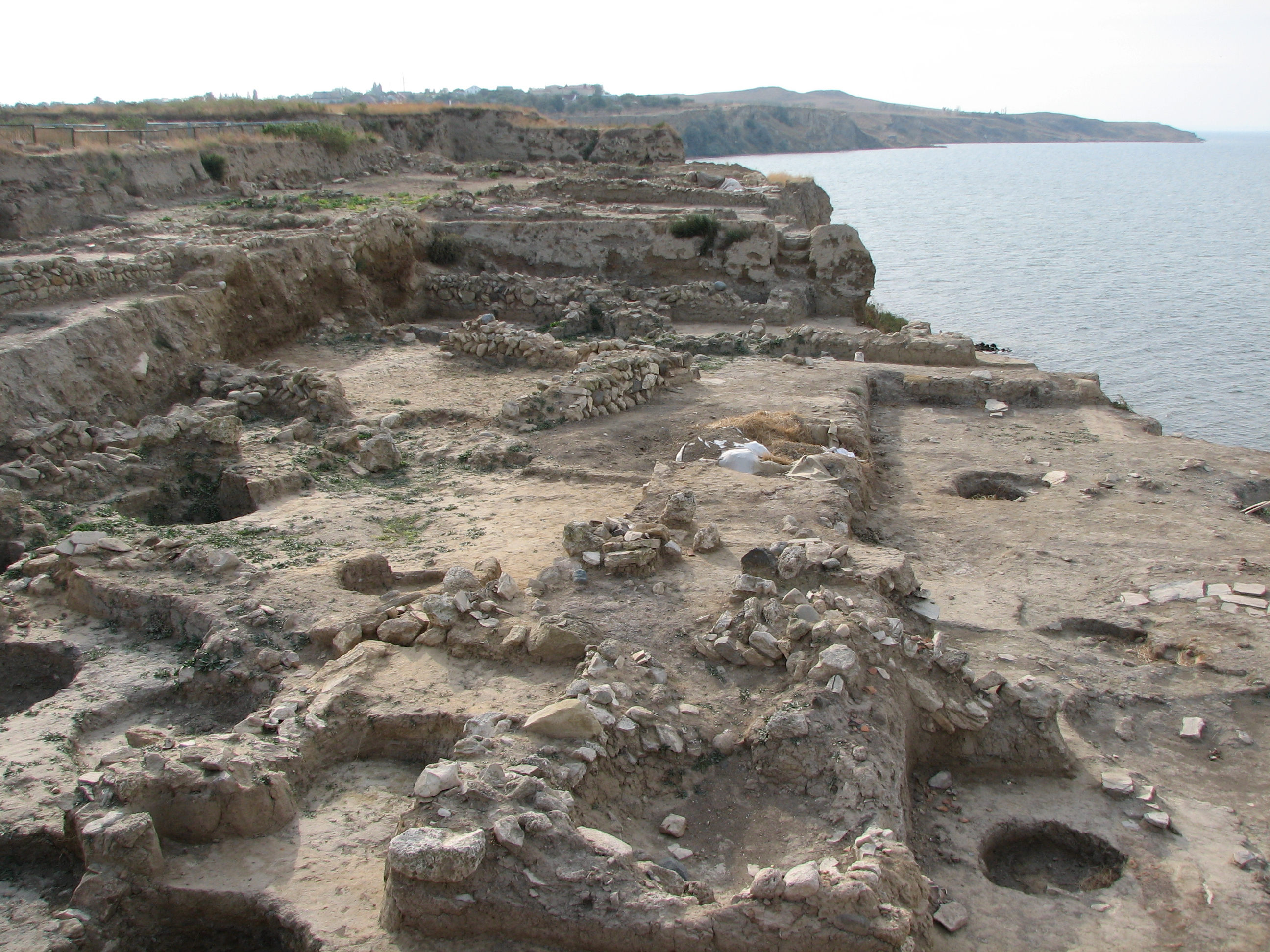
- Excavation at the site, September 2008

- Location of the site within Russia Tmutarakan (European Russia)
- 45°13′09″N 36°42′51″E
- Type: Settlement
- Location: Krasnodar Krai, Russia
- Region: Taman Peninsula

History
- Built: 6th century BCE
- Abandoned: After 14th century CE

Site notes
- Condition: In ruins

Tmutarakan (Russian: Тмутарака́нь, romanized: Tmutarakán', IPA: [tmʊtərɐˈkanʲ]; Old East Slavic: Тъмуторокань, romanized: Tǔmutorokanǐ; Adyghe: Тамэтӏаркъэй) was a medieval principality of Kievan Rus' and trading town that controlled the Cimmerian Bosporus, the passage from the Black Sea to the Sea of Azov, between the late 10th and 11th centuries. Its site was the ancient Greek colony of Hermonassa (Ancient Greek: Ἑρμώνασσα) founded in the mid 6th century BCE, by Mytilene (Lesbos), situated on the Taman Peninsula, in present-day Krasnodar Krai, Russia, roughly opposite Kerch. The Khazar fortress of Tamantarkhan (from which the Byzantine name for the city, Tamatarcha, is derived) was built on the site in the 7th century, and became known as Tmutarakan when it came under the control of Kievan Rus'.

== History ==
The Greek colony of Hermonassa was located a few miles west of Phanagoria and Panticapaeum, major trade centers for what was to become the Bosporan Kingdom. The city was founded in the mid-6th century BCE by Mytilene (Lesbos), although there is evidence of others taking part in the enterprise, including Cretans. The city flourished for some centuries and many ancient buildings and streets have been excavated from this period, as well as a hoard of 4th century golden coins. Hermonassa was a centre of the Bosporan cult of Aphrodite and in the early centuries CE was trading with the Alans. There is also archaeological evidence of extensive replanning and construction in the 2nd century CE.

After a long period as a Roman client state, the Bosporan kingdom succumbed to the Huns, who defeated the nearby Alans in 375/376. With the collapse of the Hunnic Empire in the late 5th century, the area passed within the Roman sphere once again but was taken by the Bulgars in the 6th century. Following the fall of the city to the Khazars in the late 7th century, it was rebuilt as a fortress town and renamed Tamatarkha. Arabic sources refer to it as Samkarsh al-Yahud (i.e., "Samkarsh of the Jews") in reference to the fact that the bulk of the trading there was handled by Jews. Other variants of the city's name are "Samkersh" and "Samkush".

Fortified with a strong brick wall and boasting a fine harbor, Tamatarkha was a large city of merchants. It controlled much of the Northern European trade with the Byzantine Empire and Northern Caucasus. There were also trade routes leading south-east to Armenia and the Muslim domains, as well as others connecting with the Silk Road to the east. The inhabitants included Greeks, Armenians, Rus', Jews, Ossetians, Lezgins, Georgians, and Circassians. After the destruction of the Khazar empire by Sviatoslav I of Kiev in the mid-10th century, Khazars continued to inhabit the region. The Mandgelis Document, a Hebrew letter of uncertain authenticity dated AM 4746 (985–986), refers to "our lord David, the Khazar prince" who lived in Taman and who was visited by envoys from Kievan Rus to ask about religious matters.

== Medieval history ==
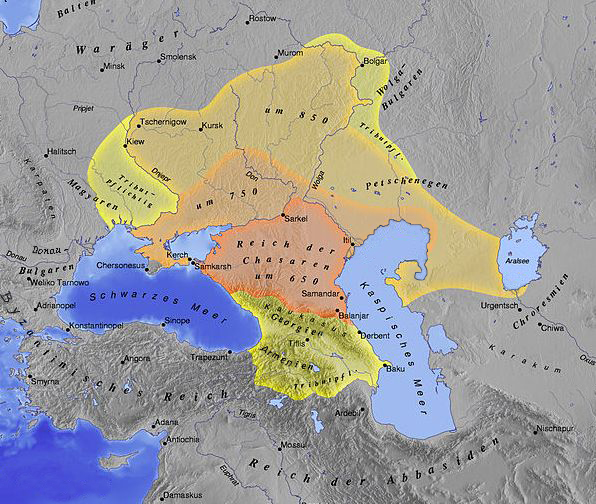
The city of Tmutarakan (Samkarsh) and its international relations during Khazar and Rus times.

Although the exact date and circumstances of Tmutarakan's takeover by Kievan Rus are uncertain, the Hypatian Codex mentions Tmutarakan as one of the towns that Vladimir the Great gave to his sons, which implies that Rus control over the city was established in the late 10th century and certainly before Vladimir's death in 1015. Bronze and silver imitations of Byzantine coinage were struck by the new rulers during this period.

Vladimir's son Mstislav of Chernigov was the prince of Tmutarakan at the start of the 11th century. During his reign, a first stone church was dedicated to the Mother of God (Theotokos). The excavated site suggests that it was built by Byzantine workmen and has similarities with the church Mstislav went on to commission in Chernigov. After his death, he was followed by a succession of short-lived petty dynasts. Gleb Svyatoslavich was given command of the city by his father, Svyatoslav Yaroslavich, but in 1064 he was displaced by the rival Rus prince Rostislav Vladimirovich who in his turn was forced to flee the city when Gleb approached with an army led by his father. Once Svyatoslav left, however, Rostislav expelled Gleb once again. During his brief rule, he subdued the local Circassians (also known as Kasogi) and other indigenous tribes, but his success provoked the suspicion of neighboring Greek Chersonesos in the Crimea, whose Byzantine envoy poisoned him on 3 February 1066.

Afterwards command of Tmutarakan returned to the prince of Chernigov and then to the Grand Prince of Kiev, Vsevolod Yaroslavich. In 1079, Svyatoslav Yaroslavich appointed a governor (posadnik), but he was captured two years later by David Igorevich and Volodar Rostislavich, who seized the city. Exiled from the city to Byzantium by Khazar agents during this turbulent time, Oleg Svyatoslavich returned to Tmutarakan in 1083 and ousted the usurpers, adopting the title of "archon of Khazaria" (Arakhan of Tmutar), and placed the city under nominal Byzantine control. But he also issued rough silver coins in his own name which included a short inscription in Cyrillic letters. Then in 1094, like Mstislav before him, he returned to Rus to claim the throne of Chernigov.

Byzantine interest in the city was maintained through this succession of client rulers, and thereafter by more direct rule for a while, for an important reason. There were naphtha deposits in the area and this was a vital ingredient of their main tactical weapon, Greek Fire. Up until the end of the 12th century the imperial authorities were forbidding their Genoese trading partners access to the city known to them as Matracha.

== Decline ==
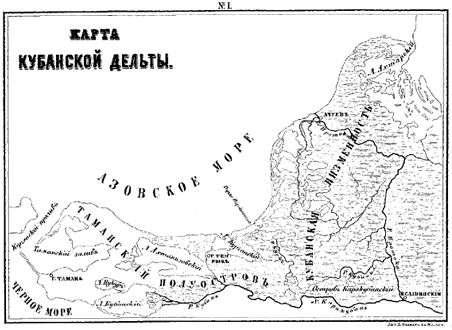
A Russian map of the Taman Peninsula, c. 1870.

In the 13th century the city passed to the Empire of Trebizond (a Byzantine successor state). Its last recorded mention was in a scroll of 1378. The region fell under the control of the Republic of Genoa in the 14th century and formed part of the protectorate of Gazaria, based at Kaffa. It was within the territory administered by the Ghisolfi family and was conquered by the Crimean Khanate in 1482 and by Russia in 1791. A possible remaining Khazar connection is suggested by mention of “Jewish princes” in Tamatarkha under both Genoese and Tatar rule.

The city subsequently fell into ruin and the site was rediscovered in 1792, when a local peasant found a stone with an inscription stating that Prince Gleb had measured the sea from here to Kerch in 1068. Archaeological excavations of the site were begun in the 19th century and have continued since. The habitation level in places exceeds twelve meters.

During much of the 17th and 18th centuries the area was dominated by Cossacks centered on the town of Taman, which was located near the remains of Tmutarakan. The modern town of Temryuk is nearby.

== Etymology ==
According to archaeologist A. Tov, the toponym "Tamatarkha" likely has an Adyghe origin. It is thought to be formed from the words тамэ ("wing" or "shoulder") and тӀаркъу ("fork" or "branching"), describing the physical shape of the peninsula where the city was located. Other theories suggest Tatar or Greek etymologies, such as Greek for "fish curing" (Τομη΄ταριχα). Afterwards it might have been given a Russian folk etymology, combining t'ma ("darkness") and tarakan ("cockroach"), to mean metaphorically 'the back of beyond', the sense that Vladimir Mayakovsky gives it.

== See also ==
- Bibliography of Russian history

== Resources ==
- Brook, Kevin Alan. The Jews of Khazaria. 2nd ed. Rowman & Littlefield Publishers, Inc, 2006.
- Christian, David. A History of Russia, Central Asia and Mongolia. Vol. 1. Blackwell, 1999. pp. 298–397.
- Dimnik, Martin. The Dynasty of Chernigov, 1146–1246. Cambridge University Press, 2003. ISBN 0-521-82442-7
- Rjabchikov, Sergei V. The Kiev Pechersk and Tmutarakan Monasteries: To the Question of Their Formation. P.E. Boyko and A.A. Tashchian (eds.) Russkaya filosofiya i Pravoslavie v kontexte mirovoy kul’tury. Krasnodar: Mir Kubani, 2005, pp. 327–332.
- Room, Adrian. Placenames Of The World: Origins and Meanings of the Names for 6,600 Countries, Cities, Territories, Natural Features and Historic Sites. 2nd ed. McFarland & Company, 2005. ISBN 0-7864-2248-3
- Shepard, Jonathan. "Close encounters with the Byzantine world: the Rus at the Straits of Kerch" in Pre-modern Russia and its world. Wiesbaden, 2006, ISBN 3-447-05425-5
- Shepard, Jonathan: "Mists and Portals: the Black Sea's north coast", pp. 421–42 in Byzantine trade, 4th-12th centuries, Farnham UK 2009, ISBN 978-0-7546-6310-2
- Tikhomirov, M. The Towns of Ancient Rus. Moscow: Foreign Languages Publishing, 1959.
- Ivanov, V. V., and Toporov, V. N., 1992. Pchela. In: S. A. Tokarev (ed.) Mify narodov mira. Vol. 2. Moscow: Sovetskaya Entsiklopediya, pp. 354–356.
- Zand, Michael, and Kharuv, Dan (1997). "Krimchaks". Encyclopaedia Judaica (CD-ROM Edition Version 1.0). Ed. Cecil Roth. Keter Publishing House. ISBN 965-07-0665-8
