= Family of Vladimir the Great =

The family of Vladimir I, popularly known as Vladimir the Great (c. 958–1015), prince of Kievan Rus', is subject to scholarly studies. The primary sources about his life, such as the Primary Chronicle and the Chronicon Thietmari of Thietmar of Merseburg, are legendary, and require critical scrutiny to separate fact (or history) from fiction (or mythology).

== Overview ==
=== Parents and siblings ===
Vladimir's father was Sviatoslav I (died 972; son of Igor and Olga), while his brothers were Oleg of the Drevlyans and Yaropolk I. The PVL reports sub anno that Malusha was Vladimir's mother. An otherwise unknown woman named "Malfrid, Malmfrid or Malfrida", who reportedly died in 1000, was identified with Malusha by Stender-Petersen.

Igor of Kiev	Olga of Kiev	?
Predslava	Sviatoslav I	Malusha	Dobrynya
Oleg	Yaropolk I	Vladimir the Great

=== Wives and concubines ===
Thietmar of Merseburg (c. 1015) described Volodimer as "an immense fornicator" (Latin: fornicator immensus) until his marriage to 'a decent wife from Greece' (Latin: a Grecia decens uxorem) and adoption 'of the holy faith of Christianity at her instigation' (Latin: christianitatis sanctae fidem eius ortatu suscepit) around 988. He supposedly had a few hundred concubines in Kiev and in the country residence of Berestovo. He is also said to have had pagan wives, the most well-known being Rogneda of Polotsk. Other wives are mentioned in the Primary Chronicle, with various children assigned to various wives in the different versions of the document. Hence, speculations abound.

According to Tampere University scholar Aleksandr Koptev (2010), 'the legend surrounding Rogneda is closely related to the legend about the Chersonese princess and the prince Jaropolk's widow, all being raped by Prince Vladimir.'

=== Lists of sons in the PVL ===
Janet L. B. Martin (2007) identified three lists of sons of Vladimir in the PVL: the first sub anno 980 (including their mothers), and the second and third sub anno 988.

- First list (sub anno 980; PVL columns 79–80): "Now Vladimir was overcome by lust for women. His lawful wife was Rogned, whom he settled on the Lybed', where the village of Predslavino now stands. By her he had four sons: Izyaslav, Mstislav, Yaroslav, and Vsevolod, and two daughters. The Greek woman bore him Svyatopolk; by one Czech he had a son Vÿsheslav; by another, Svyatoslav and Mstislav; and by a Bulgarian woman, Boris and Gleb."
- Second and third list (sub anno 988; PVL column 121): "Vladimir was enlightened, and his sons and his country with him. For he had twelve sons: Vÿsheslav, Izyaslav, Yaroslav, Svyatopolk, Vsevolod, Svyatoslav, Mstislav, Boris, Gleb, Stanislav, Pozvizd, and Sudislav. He set Vÿsheslav in Novgorod, Izyaslav in Polotsk, Svyatopolk in Turov, and Yaroslav in Rostov. When Vÿsheslav, the oldest, died in Novgorod, he set Yaroslav over Novgorod, Boris over Rostov, Gleb over Murom, Svyatoslav over Dereva, Vsevolod over Vladimir, and Mstislav over Tmutorakan'."

== Norse wife ==
Norse sagas mention that, while ruling in Novgorod in his early days, Vladimir had a Varangian wife named Olava or Allogia. This unusual name is probably a feminine form of Olaf. According to Snorri Sturluson the runaway Olaf Tryggvason was sheltered by Allogia in her house; she also paid a large fine for him.

Several authorities, notably Rydzevskaya ("Ancient Rus and Scandinavia in 9-14 cent.", 1978), hold that later skalds confused Vladimir's wife Olava with his grandmother and tutor Olga, with Allogia being the distorted form of Olga's name. Others postulate Olava was a real person and the mother of Vysheslav, the first of Vladimir's sons to reign in Novgorod, as behooves the eldest son and heir. On the other hand, there is no evidence that the tradition of sending the eldest son of Kievan monarch to Novgorod existed at such an early date.

Those scholars who believe that this early Norse wife was not fictitious, suppose that Vladimir could have married her during his famous exile in Scandinavia in the late 970s. They usually refer an account in Ingvars saga (in a part called Eymund's saga) which tells that Eric VI of Sweden married his daughter to a 'konung of fjord lying to the East from Holmgard'. This prince may have been Vladimir the Great.

== Rogned' of Polotsk ==
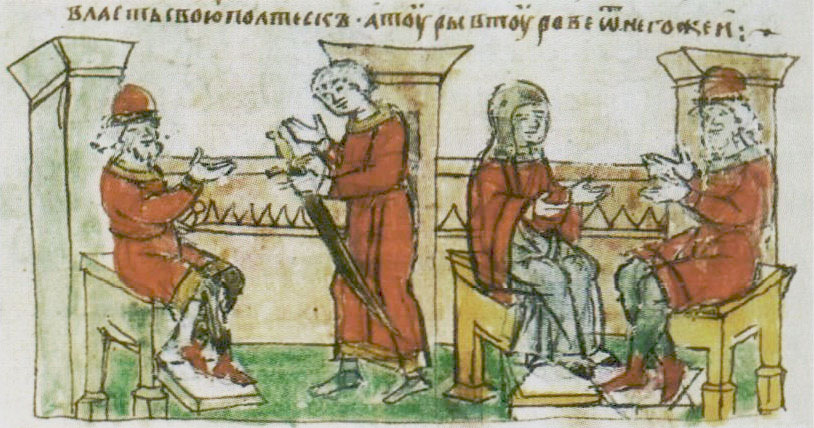
Vladimir and Rogvolod (left side); Rogvolod talks with Rogned' (right side).

Rogned' of Polotsk	Vladimir the Great
Izyaslav of Polotsk	Yaroslav the Wise	Mstislav	Vsevolod	Predslava	(daughter)

Rogneda of Polotsk (to be more precise: Rogned') was reportedly Vladimir's first wife. According to the Primary Chronicle, Vladimir wanted to forge an alliance with her father, prince Rogvolod of Polotsk, but after she refused to marry Vladimir, he killed Rogvolod and forcibly married her anyway. According to a later tradition, only found in the Suzdalian Chronicle under the year 1128, the daughter of Rogvolod was named "Gorislava" rather than Rogned', she was raped by Vladimir before her parents' eyes, and Gorislava later ordered her son Iziaslav to commit a (failed) assassination attempt on Vladimir in revenge. Most modern scholars agree that this later story was invented for political purposes, deriving from a later Novgorodian tradition that tried to assert the superiority of Yaroslav's descendants over Rogvolod's. It is safe to say that Rogned' and Gorislava were not the same woman (if the latter existed at all), and this later legendary story never happened.

The Primary Chronicle reports that Rogned' and Vladimir had six children: four sons named "Izyaslav, Mstislav, Yaroslav, and Vsevolod", and two unnamed daughters. These have been identified as Izyaslav of Polotsk (died 1001), Vsevolod of Volhynia (died c. 995), and Yaroslav the Wise (died 1054), with "Mstislav" being a bit of a mystery. He may or may not be the same person as Mstislav of Chernigov, prince of Tmutorakan, but more likely this is a different Mstislav, who in the second list of sons sub anno 988 is mentioned between Sviatoslav (who together with a "Mstislav" in the first list is identified as a son of a Czech wife) and Boris and Gleb (in the first list sons of a Bulgarian wife). Martin (2007) concluded that Rogned's son Mstislav had probably died before 988, as he is not mentioned in the list of land distributions.

Following an old Yngling tradition, Izyaslav inherited the lands of his maternal grandfather, i.e., Polotsk. According to the Kievan succession law, his progeny forfeited their rights to the Kievan throne, because their forefather had never ruled in Kiev supreme. They, however, retained the principality of Polotsk and formed a dynasty of local rulers, of which Vseslav the Sorcerer was the most notable.

=== Yaroslav's parentage ===
There is also a case for Yaroslav's descent from Anna. According to this theory, Nestor the Chronicler deliberately represented Yaroslav as Rogneda's son, because he systematically removed all information concerning Kievan ties with Byzantium, spawning pro-Varangian bias (see Normanist theory for details). Proponents allege that Yaroslav's true age was falsified by Nestor, who attempted to represent him as 10 years older than he actually had been, in order to justify Yaroslav's seizure of the throne at the expense of his older brothers.

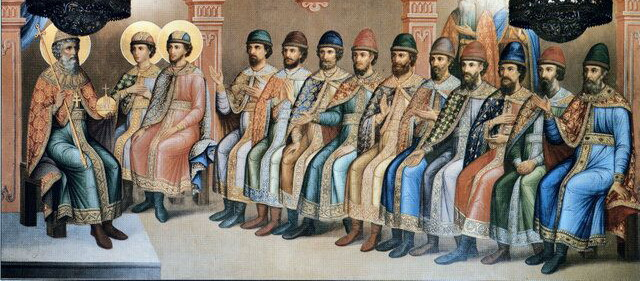
Prince Vladimir Sviatoslavich with sons (1881)

The Primary Chronicle, for instance, states that Yaroslav died at the age of 76 in 1054 (thus putting his birth at 978), while dating Vladimir's encounter and marriage to Yaroslav's purported mother, Rogneda, to 980. Elsewhere, speaking about Yaroslav's rule in Novgorod (1016), Nestor says that Yaroslav was 28, thus putting his birth at 988. The forensic analysis of Yaroslav's skeleton seems to have confirmed these suspicions, estimating Yaroslav's birth at ca. 988-990, after both the Baptism of Kievan Rus and Vladimir's divorce of Rogneda. Consequently, it is assumed that Yaroslav was either Vladimir's natural son born after the latter's baptism or his son by Anna.

Had Yaroslav an imperial Byzantine descent, he likely would not have stinted to advertise it. Some have seen the willingness of European kings to marry Yaroslav's daughters as an indication of this imperial descent. Subsequent Polish chroniclers and historians, in particular, were eager to view Yaroslav as Anna's son. Recent proponents invoke onomastic arguments, which have often proven decisive in the matters of medieval prosopography, but these may be worthless in this case specifically because of the great shift to Christian names just then experienced in the Rus royal dynasty, an upheaval more than enough to explain all unprecedented names if they are Christian. It is curious that Yaroslav named his elder son Vladimir (after his own father) and one of his daughters Anna (as if after his own mother). Also, there is a certain pattern in his sons having Slavic names (as Vladimir), and his daughters having Greek names only (as Anna). However, in the absence of better sources, Anna's maternity remains a pure speculation.

== Greek wife ==
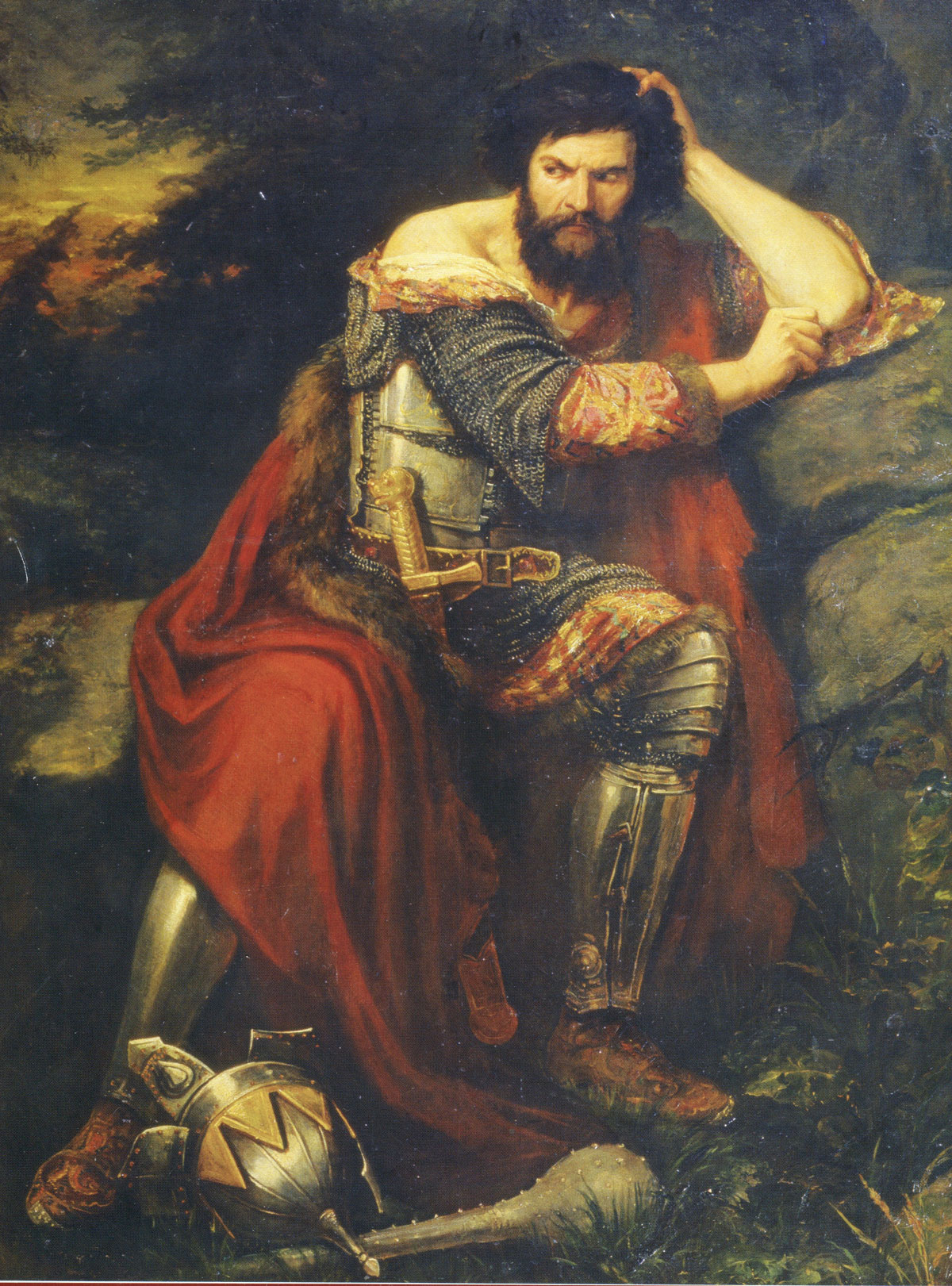
Sviatopolk I

Predslava	Sviatoslav I	Malusha
Yaropolk I	Greek nun	Vladimir the Great
daughter of Bolesław I	Sviatopolk I of Kiev

An unnamed Greek woman, who was originally a nun, is mentioned sub anno 977 by the PVL as having been captured by Vladimir's father Svyatoslav I in Bulgaria and married to his lawful heir Yaropolk I. The PVL reports that, after Vladimir's troops had killed his brother Yaropolk I at the end of the Feud of the Sviatoslavichi, he took (raped?) his late brother's wife: "Now Vladimir had intercourse with his [dead] brother [Yaropolk]'s wife, a Greek woman, and she became pregnant, and from her was born Svyatopolk." This is later confirmed: "The Greek woman bore him Svyatopolk." Thus, Sviatopolk was probably the eldest of Vladimir's sons, although both the PVL and the Skazanie disparagingly called him "the son of two fathers", and the latter explicitly claimed Yaropolk was Sviatopolk's real father. Hollingsworth (1992) noted: "While the Tale [Skazanie of Boris and Gleb] clearly indicates that Jaropolk was Svjatopolk's biological father, the account in the PVL's 977 entry (PSRL 1:78; 2:63) is more ambiguous. As a result, some scholars believe that Volodimer was Svjatopolk's actual father, while others assert that Volodimer only adopted him. In either case, it is doubtful that the Kievans made a distinction between "lawful" and "unlawful" wives or between "legitimate" and "illegitimate" offspring. There is no evidence that Volodimer treated Svjatopolk any differently than he did his other sons." On the other hand, Nestor's Chtenie of Boris and Gleb makes no mention of Yaropolk, did not question Volodimer's fatherhood, and understood Sviatopolk to be Boris' elder brother: "[The devil] entered the heart of his [Boris'] elder brother, who was named Svjatopolk."

== Czech wives ==
First Czech wife	Vladimir the Great	Second Czech wife
Vysheslav	Svyatoslav	Mstislav (of Chernigov?)

Vladimir reportedly had two unnamed Czech wives: "by one Czech [woman] he had a son Vÿsheslav; by another, Svyatoslav and Mstislav." His children by these marriages were probably Svyatoslav of the Derevlyans, killed during the 1015 internecine war, and Mstislav of Chernigov, prince of Tmutorakan. Some historians think this Mstislav was the son of Rogned' instead, but Omeljan Pritsak (1995) reasoned that it was not, and Martin (2007) concluded that Rogned's son Mstislav had probably died before 988, as he is not mentioned in the list of land distributions.

== Bulgarian wife ==
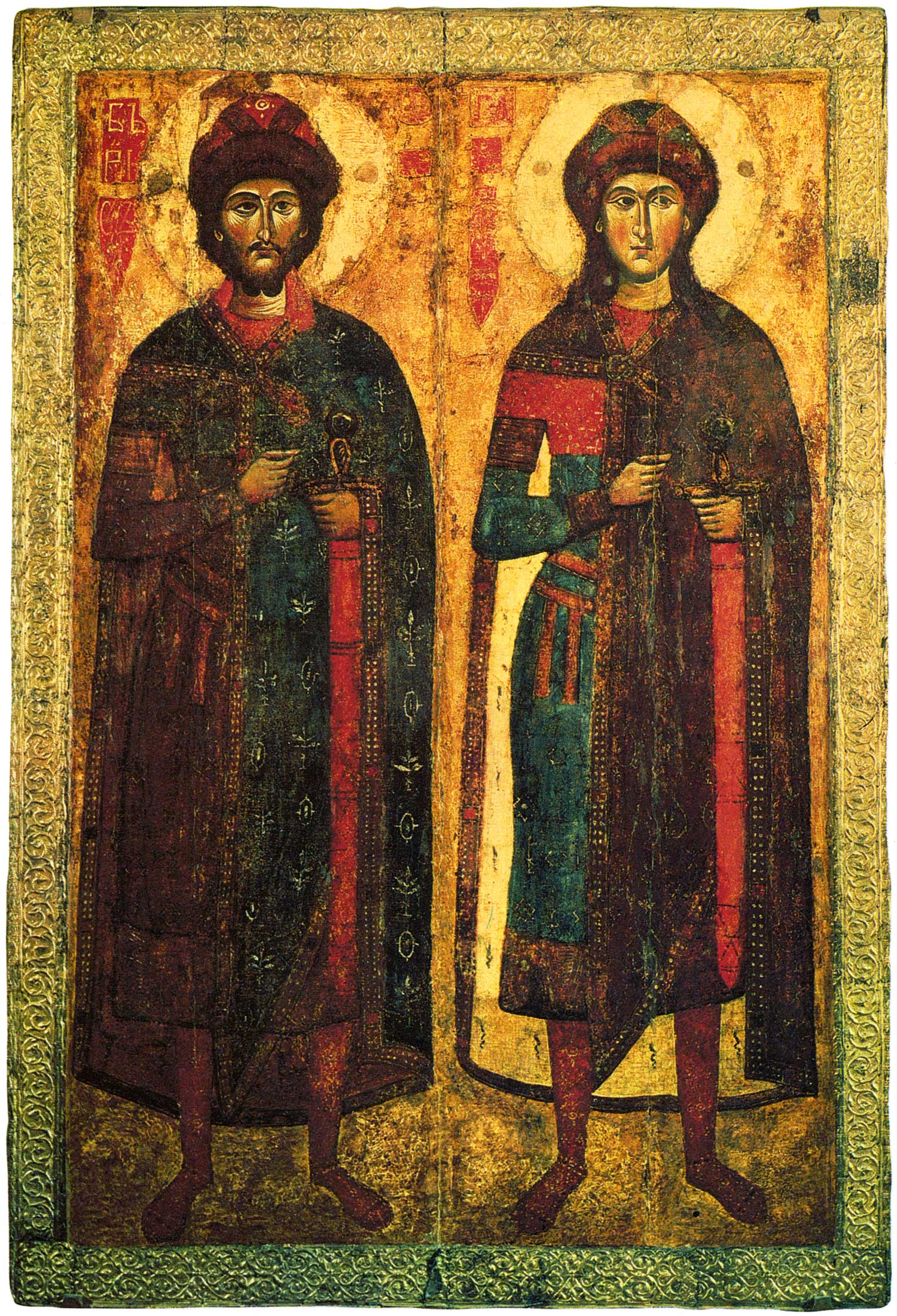
Boris and Gleb.

Vladimir the Great
Boris

Bulgarian wife
Gleb

Another wife was a Bulgarian lady. According to the Primary Chronicle, both Boris and Gleb were her children. Historians have disagreed as to whether she came from Volga Bulgaria or from Bulgaria on the Danube.

== Anna Porphyrogenita ==
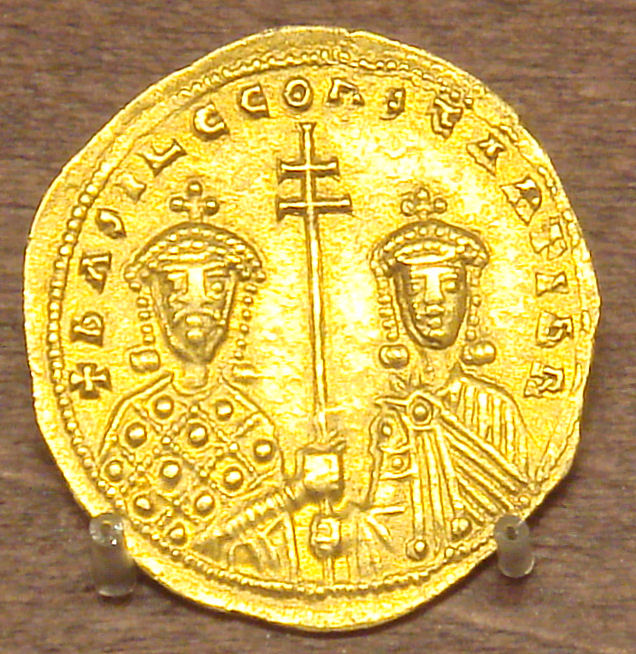
Histamenon of Anna's brothers Basil II and Constantine VIII

Anna Porphyrogenita

Vladimir the Great
Theophana?

Anna (March 13, 963 - 1011/12) was the daughter of Byzantine Emperor Romanos II (r. 959–963)) and the Empress Theophano. She was also the sister of Emperors Basil II Bulgaroktonos (the Bulgar-Slayer; r. 976–1025) and Constantine VIII. Anna was a Porphyrogenita, a legitimate daughter born in the special purple chamber of the Byzantine Emperor's Palace. Anna's hand was considered by Vladimir such a prize that he allegedly became Christian (988) just to marry her.

== German wife ==
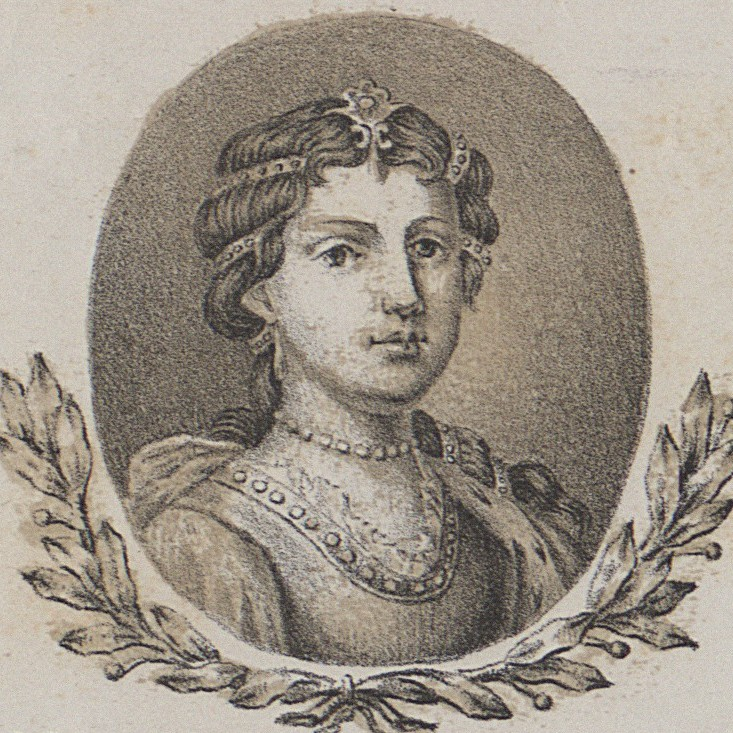
Maria Dobroniega of Kiev

granddaughter of Otto the Great	Vladimir the Great
Casimir I duke of Poland	Maria Dobroniega	out-of-wedlock daughter	Bernard margrave of Nordmark

Thietmar of Merseburg, writing from contemporary accounts, mentions that Bolesław I of Poland captured Vladimir's widow during his raid on Kiev in 1018 but Anna is known to have predeceased Vladimir by four years. So historians long had no clue who this wife was. The emigré historian Nicholas Baumgarten, however, pointed out that in the controversial records called the Genealogia Welforum and the Historia Welforum Weingartensis one daughter of Count Kuno von Oenningen (future Duke Konrad of Swabia) by "filia Ottonis Magni imperatoris" (Otto the Great's daughter; possibly Rechlinda Otona [Regelindis], claimed by some as a legitimate daughter born from his first marriage with Edith of Wessex and by others as an illegitimate child) married "rex Rugorum" (king of Russia). He interpreted this evidence as pertaining to Vladimir's last wife.

It is believed that the only child of this alliance was Dobronega, or Maria, who married Casimir I of Poland between 1038 and 1042. As her father Vladimir died about 25 years before that marriage and she was still young enough to bear at least five children, including two future Polish dukes (Bolesław II of Poland, who later became a king, and Wladyslaw Herman), it is thought probable that she was Vladimir's daughter by the last marriage.

== Obscure offspring ==
Vladimir had several children whose maternity cannot be established with certainty. These include two sons, Stanislav of Smolensk and Sudislav of Pskov, the latter outliving all of his siblings. There is also one daughter, named Predslava, who was captured by Bolesław I in Kiev and taken with him to Poland as a concubine. Another daughter, Premyslava, is attested in numerous (though rather late) Hungarian sources as the wife of Duke Ladislaus, one of the early Arpadians.

== Bibliography ==
=== Primary sources ===
- Primary Chronicle (c. 1110s).
  - Cross, Samuel Hazzard; Sherbowitz-Wetzor, Olgerd P. (1953). The Russian Primary Chronicle, Laurentian Text. Translated and edited by Samuel Hazzard Cross and Olgerd P. Sherbowitz-Wetzor (PDF). Cambridge, Massachusetts: The Mediaeval Academy of America. p. 325. (First edition published in 1930. The first 50 pages are a scholarly introduction.)
  - Thuis, Hans (2015). Nestorkroniek. De oudste geschiedenis van het Kievse Rijk (in Dutch). Nijmegen: Uitgeverij Vantilt. p. 304. ISBN 9789460042287.
  - Ostrowski, Donald; Birnbaum, David J. (7 December 2014). "Rus' primary chronicle critical edition – Interlinear line-level collation". pvl.obdurodon.org (in Church Slavic). Archived from the original on 28 April 2025.
- Thietmar of Merseburg, Chronicon Thietmari (1018).
  - Warner, David A., ed. (2001). Ottonian Germany: The Chronicon of Thietmar of Merseburg. Manchester Medieval Sources Series. Manchester & New York: Manchester University Press. ISBN 0-7190-4926-1.
- Nestor, Chtenie ("Reading", "Lesson" or "Legend") on the life and murder of Boris and Gleb (late 11th or early 12th century; dating heavily disputed).
  - Abramovych, Dmytro, ed. (1916). "Чтение о Святых Мучениках Борисе и Глебе Chtenie o Svjatykh Muchenykakh Borise i Glebe" [Reading about the Holy Martyrs Boris and Gleb]. Жития святых мучеников Бориса и Глеба, и службы им Zhitija svjatykh muchenikov Borisa i Gleba, i sluzhby im [Lives of the holy martyrs Boris and Gleb, and services to them] (in Russian). Azbuka. (based on the oldest manuscript, the 14th-century Silvestrovskij sbornik)
  - Hollingsworth, Paul (1992). "Lesson on the life of Boris and Glěb". The Hagiography of Kievan Rusʹ. Boston: Harvard Ukrainian Research Institute. pp. 3–32. ISBN 978-0-916458-28-7.
- Anonymus, Skazanie ("Tale") of Boris and Gleb (11th or 12th century; dating heavily disputed).

=== Literature ===
- Butler, Francis (2012). "The "Legend of Gorislava" (not "Rogned'" or "Rogneda"): An Edition, Commentary, and Translation". Dubitando: Studies in History and Culture in Honor of Donald Ostrowski (PDF). Bloomington: Slavica Publishers. pp. 335–352. ISBN 9780893574048.
- Koptev, Aleksandr (2010). "Ritual and History: Pagan Rites in the Story of the Princess' Revenge (the Russian Primary Chronicle, under 945–946)". Mirator. 11 (1): 1–54.
- Martin, Janet (2007). Medieval Russia: 980–1584. Second Edition. E-book. Cambridge: Cambridge University Press. ISBN 978-0-511-36800-4.
- Poppe, Andrzej (1988). "Two Concepts of the Conversion of Rus' in Kievan Writings". Harvard Ukrainian Studies. Proceedings of the International Congress Commemorating the Millennium of Christianity in Rus'-Ukraine 1988–1989. 12. Harvard Ukrainian Research Institute: 488–504.
