= Mal (prince) =

Prince of the Drevlian tribe (?-946)

- Мал
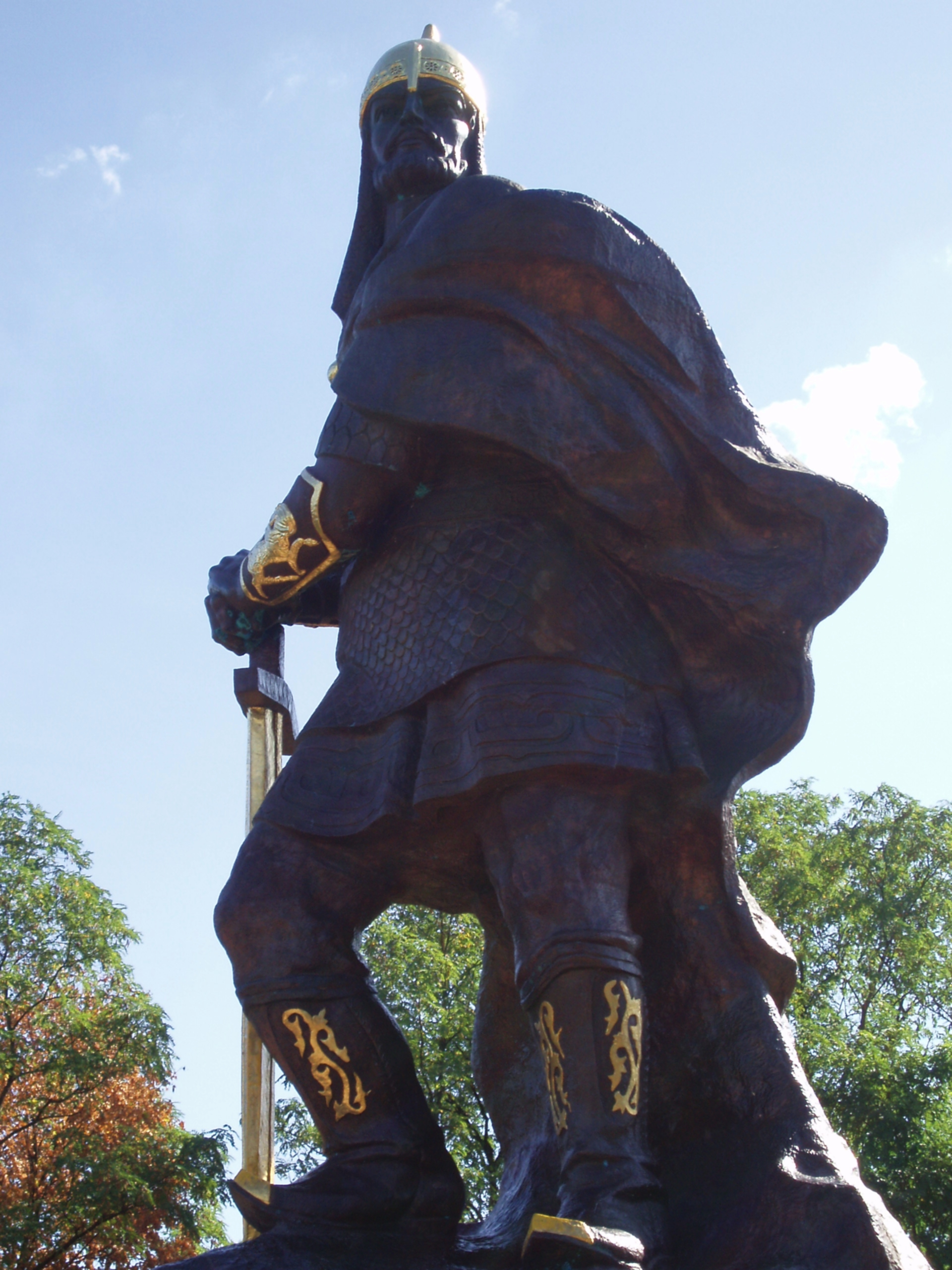

Prince of the Drevlians

Personal details
- Born: Unknown
- Died: 946
- Children: According to some sources, Malusha and Dobrynya
- Parent: Niskinia (father)

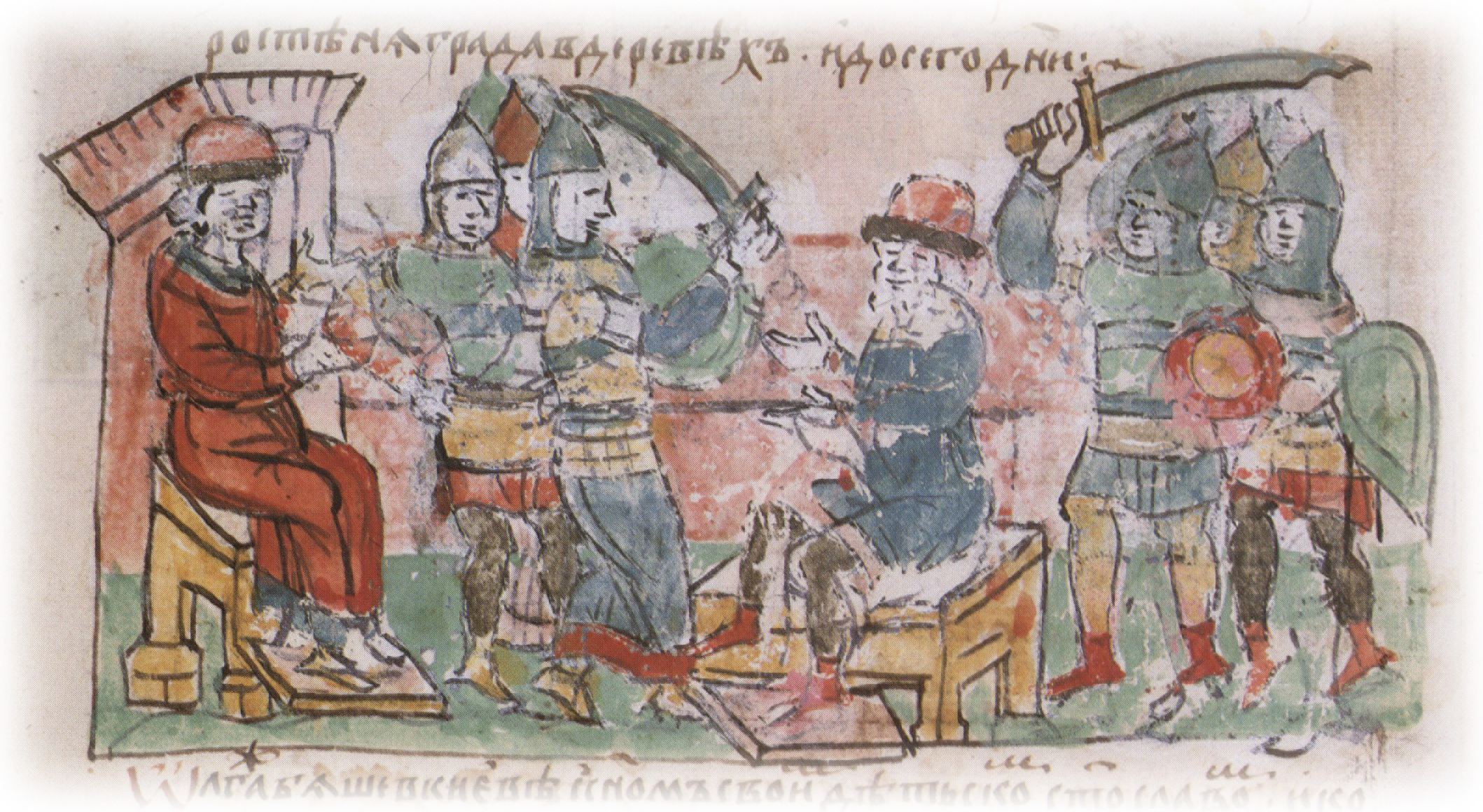
The death of Igor of Kiev, as ordered by Mal. A miniature in the Radziwiłł Chronicle, late 15th century.

Mal (died 946) was a Drevlian prince, and was the leader of the 945 revolt against Igor of Kiev. Immediately following the revolt, which led to Igor's death, Mal attempted to marry the widowed Olga of Kiev. In foreign sources, he bears the name of "Niskinia" (according to Jan Długosz), and "Malditt" (according to Sigmund von Herberstein). Mal's name is attributed to the Ukrainian city of Malyn.

According to Russian historian Vasily Tatishchev, the Ioachim Chronicle states that Mal was a "Drevlian Prince, the son of Niskinia". (Note: Russian text: "князь древлянский, сын Нискинин".)

The component "mal" was part of a number of Celtic names, such as Gaulish "Malorix", or Old Irish "Cathmal".

== The revolt of 945 ==
The Primary Chronicle states that after the Prince of Kiev, Igor, after collecting tribute from the Drevlians once already, had returned again to collect more from the tribe. The Drevlians, led by Mal, had decided to resist.

They then sent forward to Igor' inquiring why he had returned, since he had collected all the tribute. But Igor did not heed them, and the Derevlians came forth from the city of Iskorosten' and slew Igor and his company, for the number of the latter was few.

— Primary Chronicle, year 6453 (945)

After the death of Igor, Mal attempted to propose marriage to the newly-widowed Olga.

The Derevlians then said, "See, we have killed the Prince of Rus'. Let us take his wife Olga for our Prince Mal, and then we shall obtain possession of Svyatoslav, and work our will upon him."

— Primary Chronicle, year 6453 (945)

Mal's attempt failed. Olga killed his ambassadors, who proposed a marriage between the two, on two occasions. The following year, she went to war against the Drevlians and defeated them. The last center of resistance was the city of Iskorosten, which is now known as Korosten.

The people fled from the city, and Olga ordered her soldiers to catch them. Thus she took the city and burned it, and captured the elders of the city. Some of the other captives she killed, while she gave others as slaves to her followers. The remnant she left to pay tribute.

— Primary Chronicle, year 6454 (946)

== Dmitri Prozorovskiy's hypothesis ==
In 1864, Russian historian and Dmitri Prozorovskiy wrote a hypothesis that Mal survived Olga's plot and campaign against the Drevlians, and ended up settling in the town of Liubech. Due to a similarity in names, Prozorovskiy identified Mal with "Malko Lyubechanin", the father of Malusha, the housekeeper of Princess Olga and the mother of Prince Vladimir, and her brother Dobrynya.

Prozorovskiy believed that it was the hypothetical princely origins of Malusha and Dobrynya that later provided them with a special position at court, and gave Malusha and Prince Svyatoslav's son Vladimir the opportunity to become the Grand Prince, despite the fact that he was "робичичем", the son of a slave. Dobrynya became the governor in Novgorod, where Vladimir and Malusha were soon sent.

== Monument ==
A monument to Mal was established in 2005, in the Ukrainian city of Korosten, (Note: The monument is located in the city's "Drevlian Park".) to commemorate the 1300th anniversary of the town.

== In popular culture ==
- A fictitious portrayal of Mal makes an appearance in the 18th century play, "Olga", by playwright Yakov Knyazhnin.
- In The Legend of Princess Olga (1983; USSR) by Yuri Ilyenko, Viktor Demertash plays the role of Mal.
- Pages of Russian History, the Land of Ancestors. (1994; Russia), by director Alexander Guryev.

== See also ==
- East Slavs
- Drevlians
- Olga of Kiev
- List of tribes and states in Belarus, Russia and Ukraine
