= Anna Porphyrogenita =

Grand Princess consort of Kiev
- Tenure: 989 – c. 1011
- Born: 13 March 963; Constantinople, Byzantine Empire
- Died: c. 1011 (aged approx. 48); Kiev
- Spouse: Vladimir I of Kiev
- Issue: St. Boris; St. Gleb; Theophana
- House: Macedon
- Father: Romanos II
- Mother: Theophano

Anna Porphyrogenita (Note: Medieval Greek: Ἄννα Πορφυρογεννήτη, romanized: Anna Porphyrogennētē; Russian: Анна Византийская; Ukrainian: Анна Порфірогенета) (Greek: Άννα Πορφυρογέννητη; 13 March 963 – 1011) was the grand princess consort of Kiev during her marriage to Vladimir the Great.

== Life ==
Anna was the daughter of Byzantine emperor Romanos II and the Empress Theophano. She was also the sister of Emperors Basil II and Constantine VIII. Anna was a Porphyrogenita, a legitimate daughter born in the special purple chamber of the Byzantine Emperor's Palace. Anna's hand was considered such a prize that some theorize that Vladimir became Christian just to marry her.

Anna did not wish to marry Vladimir and expressed deep distress on her way to her wedding. Vladimir was impressed by Byzantine religious practices; this factor, along with his marriage to Anna, led to his decision to convert to Eastern Christianity. Due to these two factors, he also began Christianizing his realm. He also gave up his other wives and mistresses.

By marriage to Grand Prince Vladimir, Anna became the grand princess of Kiev, but in practice, she was referred to as queen or tsarina, probably as a sign of her membership of the imperial Byzantine dynasty. Anna participated actively in the Christianization of Rus': she acted as the religious adviser of Vladimir and founded a few convents and churches herself.

She likely lived in the halls built on the Starokievskaia Hill, thus enjoying the feasts held there every Sunday, presumably after religious service in the nearby church of the Mother of God.

After her death, she was put to rest in a marble sarcophagus next to Vladimir's own sarcophagus, a sign of different status and conjugal relationship.

== Progeny ==
It is not known whether she was the biological mother of any of Vladimir's children, although some scholars have pointed to evidence that she and Vladimir may have had as many as three children together, possibly Gleb-David, Boris-Romanos, and Theophana. Polish medievalist, Andrzej Poppe proposes that the last two were named after Anna's parents. Furthermore, French historian, Jean-Pierre Arrignon argues that Yaroslav the Wise was indeed Anna's son, as this would explain his interference in Byzantine affairs in 1043. William Humphreys also favors a reconstruction making Yaroslav the son, rather than the step-son, of Anna, by invoking onomastic arguments. There is a certain pattern in his sons having Slavic names, and his daughters having Greek names only. This view is corroborated by the study of Yaroslav's remains carried out in 1939–1940, as well as his age given in the Primary Chronicle, which would place him amongst Vladimir's youngest children (with 988–990 as his estimated date of birth). In fact, Yaroslav's maternity by Rogneda of Polotsk has been questioned by some, since Mykola Kostomarov in the 19th century.

However, there is good evidence that Rogneda is in fact Yaroslav's mother. According to Alexander Koptev, "Rogneda is obviously represented as Prince Vladimir's most significant wife because she was the mother of Jaroslav", when referring to following the entry in the Primary Chronicle: "In this year died also Rogned, Yaroslav's mother." Simon Franklin and Jonathan Shepard also state that Yaroslav is the son of Vladimir and Rogneda, drawing on their reading of the Primary Chronicle.

== See also ==
- Family of Vladimir the Great

== Notes ==
Russian royalty
Vacant Title last held by Unconfirmed; Last known consort: Malfrida	Grand Princess consort of Kiev; 988–1011	Vacant Title next held by Unconfirmed; Next known: Ingegerd Olofsdotter
