= Olava, Grand Princess of Kiev =

Olava (Ukrainian: Олова) (?-990), was possibly a Grand Princess of the Kiev by marriage to Vladimir the Great, Grand Prince of Kiev (r. 980–1015).

== Issue ==
- Vysheslav (c. 977 – c. 1010), Prince of Novgorod (988–1010)
