= Malusha =

10th-century concubine

Malusha Malkovna
- Born: Liubech
- Spouse: Sviatoslav I
- Issue: Vladimir Sviatoslavich
- Father: Malk of Liubech

Malusha Malkovna (Old East Slavic: Малушa) was allegedly an enslaved handmaiden (kholopka) for Olga of Kiev and a concubine of Sviatoslav I of Kiev. According to chronicles, she was the mother of Vladimir the Great and sister of Dobrynya. The Norse sagas describe Vladimir's mother as a prophetess who lived to the age of 100 and was brought from her cave to the palace to predict the future.

== Origin ==
As the chronicles are silent on the subject of Malusha's pedigree, 19th-century Russian historians devised various theories to explain her parentage and name.

Malusha Malkovna is said to be the daughter of Malk of Liubech, prince of the Drevlians. The same one that wanted to marry Olga of Kiev after she became a widow. However, historian Leo Loewenson rebutted that Malk was not Drevlian nor a prince, pointing out that the Primary Chronicle only mentions his name as 'Malk Lyubechinin' or 'Malk of Lyubech' and that "there is not the faintest indication that Malyusha's father was a prince". Loewenson further notes that Lyubech "was a town of the Severians not the Drevlians".

Dmitry Prozorovsky believed that Malusha was the daughter of Mal, a Drevlyan leader. The same one that wanted to marry Olga of Kiev after she became a widow.

The Primary Chronicle records that a certain "Malfrid" died in 1000. This record follows that of Rogneda's death. Since Rogneda was Vladimir's wife, historians assume that Malusha was another close relative of the ruling prince, preferably his wife or mother.

The anti-Normanist historian Dmitry Ilovaisky managed to draw an opposite conclusion: that the Slavic name Malusha was turned into a Scandinavian Malfried. This claim received no wider support.

== Legacy ==
There are monuments of Malusha with her young son, Vladimir, in Korosten, Ukraine.
