= Rogneda of Polotsk =

Princess of Polotsk (c. 960–c. 1000)

Rogneda
- Princess of Polotsk
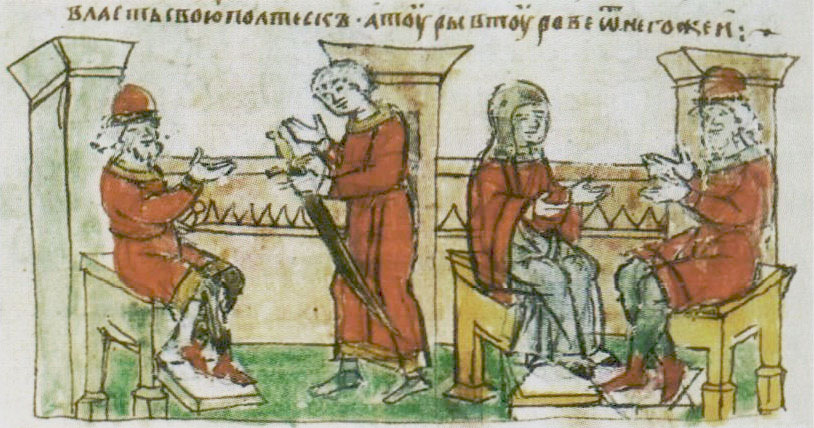
- Matchmakers Vladimir Svyatoslavich in Rogvolod (left side); Rogvolod talks with Rogneda (right side).
- Born: c. 960
- Died: c. 1000
- Spouse: Vladimir the Great (divorced)
- Issue more...: Iziaslav of Polotsk; Yaroslav the Wise (officially)
- Father: Rogvolod

Rogneda (Note: Belarusian: Рагнеда Рагвалодаўна, romanized: Ragneda Ragvalodaŭna. Russian: Рогнеда Рогволодовна, romanized: Rogneda Rogvolodovna. Ukrainian: Рогніда, romanized: Rohnida.) or Rogned (Church Slavonic: Рогънѣдь, romanized: Rogŭnědĭ; Christian name: Anastasia; c. 960 – c. 1000), also known as Ragnhild (Ragnheiðr), is a person mentioned in the Primary Chronicle as having been a princess of Polotsk, the daughter of Rogvolod (Ragnvald), who came from Scandinavia and established himself at Polotsk in the mid-10th century. Vladimir the Great is narrated as having killed her father and taking her as one of his wives.

In a closely related, but separate story in the Suzdalian Chronicle, the daughter of Rogvolod of Polotsk is called Gorislava, and Vladimir rapes her in front of her parents before killing her father and taking her as a wife, after which Gorislava attempts to kill Vladimir in revenge.

== Rogned' in the Primary Chronicle ==
Around the year 980, Vladimir, then the prince of Novgorod, was entangled in a war of succession with his brother Yaropolk, the prince of Kiev. Searching for allies, Vladimir proposed to Rogvolod a marriage-tie by wedding his daughter Rogned' (Rogneda), but she declared: "I do not wish to take off (Note: 'The removal of the man's shoe by the woman, a sign of submission, was part of the Slavic marriage ritual.') a slave's son's shoes" ("не хочу розути робичича"), "but I do want to take off Yaropolk's". Afterwards, Vladimir led an army to devastate Polotsk, killing Rogvolod and his two sons, while taking Rogneda as a wife. According to Jonathan Shepard and Simon Franklin, Vladimir was most likely seeking to bolster his political legitimacy rather than being motivated solely by vengeance. Koptev, (2014) commenting on the Primary Chronicle states that "Rogneda is obviously represented as Prince Vladimir’s most significant wife because she was the mother of Jaroslav".

The Primary Chronicle indicates that Vladimir had four sons with Rogneda. The first list, which identifies the mothers of his sons, includes the names of Iziaslav, Mstislav, Yaroslav and Vsevolod as the sons of Rogneda. After Vsevolod are the names of Sviatopolk, Vysheslav, Sviatoslav and another son called Mstislav (possibly Mstislav of Chernigov). A third list identifies the lands that were distributed to them by Vladimir, which appears to be ordered by age, with Vysheslav first, then Iziaslav, Sviatopolk, Sviatoslav, and then Yaroslav; the absence of Mstislav suggests he had died before the distributions were made, and after the initial distributions but before Vladimir's death in 1015, Vysheslav and Iziaslav had died, leaving Sviatopolk as the eldest surviving son. After Vladimir converted to Christianity and took Anna Porphyrogeneta as his wife, he had to divorce all his previous wives, including Rogneda. After that, she entered the convent and took the name Anastasia.

== Gorislava in the Suzdalian Chronicle ==
The later Suzdalian Chronicle tells a story, most likely taken from a Norse saga, of Rogvolod's daughter – here called "Gorislava" – plotting against Vladimir and asking her elder son, Izyaslav, to kill him. As was the Norse royal custom, she was sent with her elder son to govern the land of her parents, i.e. Polotsk. Izyaslav's line continued to rule Polotsk and the newly found town of Izyaslavl (now called Zaslawye).

Modern scholars have examined the differences and similarities between the stories of Rogned' in the Primary Chronicle and Gorislava in the Suzdalian Chronicle. Earlier scholars have proposed that Rogned' (Rogneda) was later "renamed" Gorislava, an idea especially promoted by the 16th-century Nikon Chronicle as included in Nikolay Karamzin's History of the Russian State (1816–26). But the first source to suggest these two women were one and the same person, who was somehow renamed, does not appear until the Moskovskii letopsnyi svod 1479 g., 500 years after the events they narrate. Francis Butler (2012) and several other scholars believe that the legend of Gorislava was written later than the legend of Rogned', and that the women were initially named differently before later traditions identified them as the same person. Nevertheless, the two narratives contain a brief passage that is almost word for word the same. Aleksandr Koptev (2010) reasoned that 'her attempt to kill her own husband seems to me an obvious later addition to the original story of Rogneda'. He added: 'Shakhmatov is almost certainly correct when he suggests that the story derives from the later Novgorodian tradition, which asserted the superiority of the clan of Jaroslav's descendants in comparison to Rogvolod's descendants ruling in Polotzk.'

== Texts ==
Act	The Legend of Rogned' (Rogneda) Primary Chronicle sub anno 980 Laurentian + Hypatian texts	The Legend of Gorislava Suzdalian Chronicle sub anno 1128 Laurentian + Radziwiłł + Academic texts
Request	Vladimir returned to Novgorod with Varangians, and told the lieutenants of Yaropolk: 'You need to go to my brother and tell him: "Vladimir is advancing against you, prepare to fight".' He established himself in Novgorod, and sent messengers to Rogvolod in Polotsk with the word: 'I want your daughter as a wife.'	About these Vseslavichi it is thus, as knowledgeable people have related, that Rogvolod was holding and ruling and reigning in the land of Polotsk, and Vladimir was in Novgorod, still a child and a pagan. And the commander of his forces was his uncle Dobrynia, a brave and effective man. And this man sent to Rogvolod and requested his daughter for Vladimir.
Rejection	He [Rogvolod] asked his daughter: 'Do you want to marry Vladimir?' She replied: 'I do not want to untie the shoes of a slave's son, but I want Yaropolk [instead].' Now Rogvolod had come from overseas, and exercised the authority in Polotsk, just as Tury, from whom the Turovians get their name, had done in Turov.	And he (Rogvolod) said to his daughter: 'Do you want to marry Vladimir?' And she said: 'I do not want to unshoe a slave's son, but want Yaropolk', for Rogvolod had come from across the sea, and he had his domain, Polotsk.
Capture	The servants of Vladimir returned and reported to him all the words of Rogned', the daughter of Rogvolod, Prince of Polotsk. Vladimir then collected a large army, consisting of Varangians, Slovenes, Chuds, and Krivichians, and marched against Rogvolod. At this time, the intention was that Rogned' should marry Yaropolk. [But] Vladimir attacked Polotsk, killed Rogvolod and his two sons. He took his daughter as a wife. Then he proceeded against Yaropolk.	And Vladimir, having heard, became angry about that remark: ‘I do not [want/want to marry] a slave’s son.’ And Dobrynia became angry and was filled with fury, and they took forces and marched on Polotsk and defeated Rogvolod. Rogvolod fled into the fortress. And they came to the fortress and took the fortress. And they took [Rogvolod] himself and his wife and his daughter. And Dobrynia insulted him and his daughter [calling her a slave's daughter/who called him a slave’s son], and he ordered Vladimir to be with her in front of her father and mother. Then he killed the father and took her herself as a wife and they named her "Gorislava".
Gorislava's revenge		And she bore Iziaslav. And he also took many other wives and she became unhappy. Once when she he had come to her and fallen asleep she wanted to kill him with a knife. And it happened that he awoke and took her by the hand. And she said: 'I have become sad because you killed my father and seized his land for my sake, and now you do not love me and this child.'
Iziaslav's plot		And he ordered her to dress herself in all her royal raiment, as on the day of her wedding, and to sit on the bright bedding in the chamber, so that he might come and stab her to death. She did so, giving a naked sword into the hand of her son Iziaslav and saying (to Iziaslav): 'When (your) father enters, say, stepping forth, "Father, do you think you are walking here alone?"' And Vladimir said: 'And who would have expected you here?' and he threw down his sword
Boyar council		and called together the boyars and told them. And they said: “For the sake of this child do not kill her, but restore her patrimony and give it to her with her son.” And Vladimir fortified a city and gave it to them and gave that city the name Iziaslavl.
Epilogue		And since then the descendants of Rogvolod take up the sword against the descendants of Yaroslav.

== Legacy ==
Around 1823, Kondraty Ryleev wrote a narrative poem "Rogneda". This poem became a literary source for her portrayal in the nationalist Russian opera Rogneda by Alexander Serov, which premiered in 1865.

== Issue ==
By Vladimir the Great:

1. Izyaslav of Polotsk (born c. 979, Kiev), Prince of Polotsk (989–1001)
2. Yaroslav the Wise (born no earlier than 983), Prince of Rostov (988–1010), Prince of Novgorod (1010–1034), Grand Prince of Kiev (1016–1018, 1019–1054). He was possibly a son of Anna rather than Rogneda. Another interesting fact is that he was younger than Sviatopolk according to the words of Boris in the Tale of Bygone Years and not as it was officially known.
3. Mstislav (possibly Mstislav of Chernigov, Prince of Tmutarakan (990–1036), Prince of Chernigov (1024–1036); other sources claim him to be son of other mothers (Adela, Malfrida, or some other Bulgarian wife)
4. Predslava, concubine of Bolesław I Chrobry according to Gesta principum Polonorum
5. Premislava (died 1015), some source state that she was a wife of the Duke Laszlo (Vladislav) "the Bald" of Arpadians
6. Mstislava, in 1018 was taken by Bolesław I Chrobry among the other daughters
7. Ariogia (?)

== See also ==
- Family of Vladimir the Great
- List of rape victims from history and mythology

== Bibliography ==
Primary sources

- Cross, Samuel Hazzard; Sherbowitz-Wetzor, Olgerd P. (1953). The Russian Primary Chronicle, Laurentian Text. Translated and edited by Samuel Hazzard Cross and Olgerd P. Sherbowitz-Wetzor (PDF). Cambridge, Massachusetts: The Mediaeval Academy of America. p. 325.
- Ostrowski, Donald; Birnbaum, David J. (7 December 2014). "Rus' primary chronicle critical edition – Interlinear line-level collation". pvl.obdurodon.org (in Church Slavic). Archived from the original on 28 April 2025.
- Litopys (1908). Лѣтопись По Ипатьевскому Списку [The Chronicle according to the Hypatian Codex]. Complete Collection of Russian Chronicles (PSRL). Volume 2. 3rd Edition. Col. 57–88. Saint Petersburg: Typography of Edward Prats.
- Thuis, Hans (2015). Nestorkroniek. De oudste geschiedenis van het Kievse Rijk (in Dutch). Nijmegen: Uitgeverij Vantilt. p. 304. ISBN 9789460042287.

Literature

- Butler, Francis (2012). "The "Legend of Gorislava" (not "Rogned'" or "Rogneda"): An Edition, Commentary, and Translation". Dubitando: Studies in History and Culture in Honor of Donald Ostrowski (PDF). Bloomington: Slavica Publishers. pp. 335–352. ISBN 9780893574048.
- Koptev, Aleksandr (2010). "Ritual and History: Pagan Rites in the Story of the Princess' Revenge (the Russian Primary Chronicle, under 945–946)". Mirator. 11 (1): 1–54.
- Martin, Janet (2007). Medieval Russia: 980–1584. Second Edition. E-book. Cambridge: Cambridge University Press. ISBN 978-0-511-36800-4.
