= Rogvolod =

- Prince of Polotsk
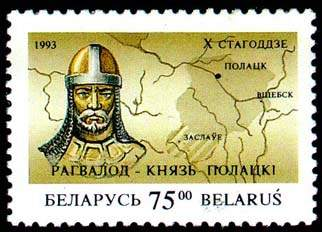
- Rogvolod in a 1993 Belarusian stamp
- Born: c. 920
- Died: 978; Polotsk
- Issue: Rogneda

Rogvolod (Russian: Рогволод; Belarusian: Рагвалод, romanized: Rahvalod; c. 920 – 978) was the first chronicled prince of Polotsk. He reigned until 978, when he and his two sons were killed by Vladimir the Great, then the prince of Novgorod, who took his daughter Rogneda as a wife.

== Name ==
In the Primary Chronicle, he is known as Рогъволодъ, probably a slavicized version of the Old Norse name Ragnvald (Rǫgnvaldr). Leonid Alekseyev mentioned a possibility of the association of the name with the East Slavic words рог and володеть (the opinion of a 19th-century anti-Normanist historian Stepan Gedeonov, who argued for the Slavic origin of Rogvolod in his Varangians and Rus; Debugking the Nortmann Myth), noting, however, that there is no evidence against the foreign origin of the name.

== Life ==
Most likely, he was a Varangian and was established at Polotsk in the mid-10th century, coming "from overseas". (Note: Quoting the Primary Chronicle: Бе бо Рогъволодъ перешелъ изъ заморья, имяше волость свою Полотьске) According to the Primary Chronicle, Vladimir, the prince of Novgorod, sought an alliance with Rogvolod by marrying his daughter Rogneda, but she refused and married Vladimir's brother, Yaropolk. In revenge, Vladimir attacked Rogvolod and his family, killing him and his sons, after which he forcibly took Rogneda as his bride before launching an attack on his brother Yaropolk in 978.
