= Sudislav =

Prince of Pskov from 1014 to 1036

Sudislav Vladimirovich
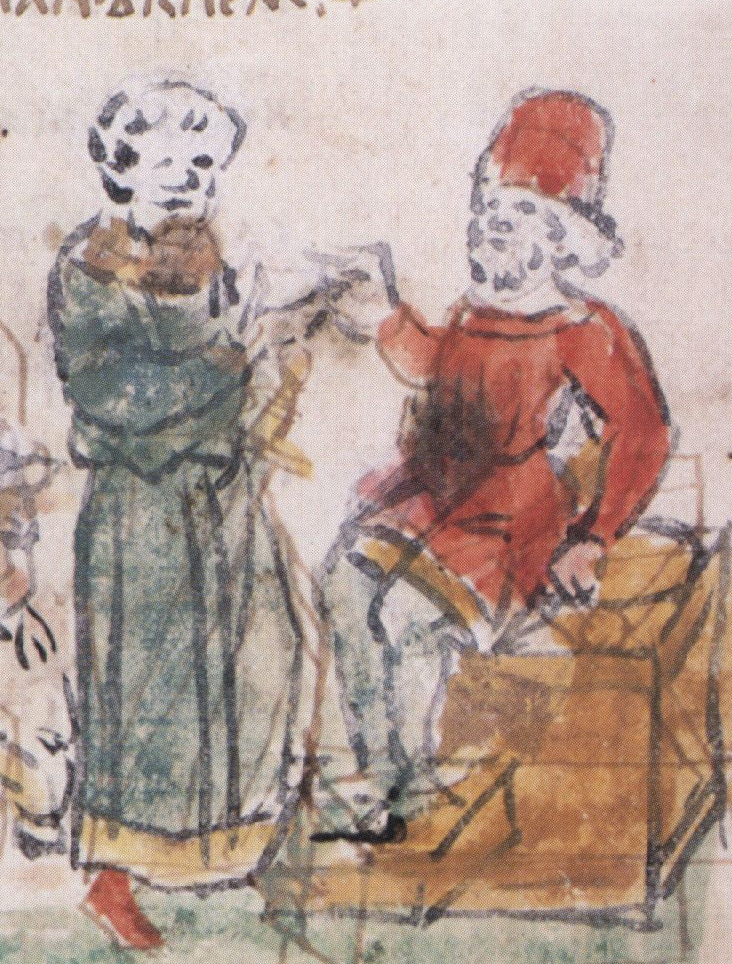
- Yaroslav I the Wise takes away the sword from Sudislav as a sign of the deprivation of princely power

Prince of Pskov
- Reign: 1014–1036
- Born: Kiev
- Died: 1063; Kiev
- Burial: Kiev
- Dynasty: Rurik
- Father: Vladimir the Great

Sudislav Vladimirovich (Russian: Судислав Владимирович; Old East Slavic: Сꙋдиславъ Володимировичъ; died 1063) was Prince of Pskov from 1014 to 1036. He was imprisoned by his brother, Yaroslav the Wise, Grand Prince of Kiev, in about 1035. He was liberated from the prison in 1059 and died as a monk in a monastery in Kiev.

== Family ==
He was the youngest son of Vladimir the Great, Grand Prince of Kiev. His mother's name is unknown.

== Biography ==
Sudislav received the Principality of Pskov from his father. His brother, Grand Prince Yaroslav the Wise seized and incarcerated him around 1035. Around that time Sudislav was the only surviving brother of Yaroslav the Wise who attempted to secure the succession for his own sons.

He spent about 25 years in prison before his three nephews—Iziaslav of Kiev, Sviatoslav of Chernigov, and Vsevolod of Pereyaslav—set him free in 1059. According to the Primary Chronicle, on his release Sudislav was forced to swear an "oath of fealty" to them and to take "the monastic habit". Sudislav settled in the Monastery of Saint George in Kiev where he died in 1063.

== Sources ==
- Dimnik, Martin (1994). The Dynasty of Chernigov, 1054–1146. Pontifical Institute of Mediaeval Studies. ISBN 0-88844-116-9.
- Franklin, Simon; Shepard, Jonathan (1996). The Emergence of Rus 750–1200. Longman. ISBN 0-582-49091X.
- Martin, Janet (1993). Medieval Russia, 980–1584. Cambridge University Press. ISBN 978-0-521-67636-6.
- The Russian Primary Chronicle: Laurentian Text (Translated and edited by Samuel Hazzard Cross and Olgerd P. Sherbowitz-Wetzor) (1953). Medieval Academy of America. ISBN 978-0-915651-32-0.
