= Vysheslav Vladimirovich =

Vysheslav (Russian: Вышеслав, c. 977 – c. 1010), was Prince (knyaz) of Veliky Novgorod (988–1010). He was son of Olava, Grand Princess of Kiev and Vladimir the Great, Vladimir's oldest son.

After his death his seat in Novgorod was transferred to his brother, Yaroslav.
