= Theophano (born Anastaso) =

Byzantine empress from 956 to 969

- Augusta
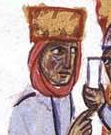
- Depicted in John Skylitzes's History (11th century)

Byzantine empress consort
- Tenure: 959 – March 963; August 963 – 969

Byzantine empress regent
- Regency: March - August 963
- Regent: Basil II; Constantine VIII
- Born: Anastasia c. 941; Laconia
- Died: after 978
- Spouses: Romanos II; Nikephoros II Phokas
- Issue: Helena; Basil the Bulgar-Slayer; Constantine VIII; Anna Porphyrogenita
- Father: Craterus
- Mother: Maria

Theophano (Greek: Θεοφανώ, romanized: Theophanō; c. 941 – after 978) was a Greek woman from the region of Laconia, who became Byzantine empress by marriage to emperors Romanos II and Nikephoros II. In 963, between the deaths of Romanos and her marriage to Nikephoros, she was regent for her sons, Basil II and Constantine VIII. Contemporary sources have depicted Theophano as scheming and adulterous, although some modern scholars have called this into question.

== Marriage to Romanos II ==
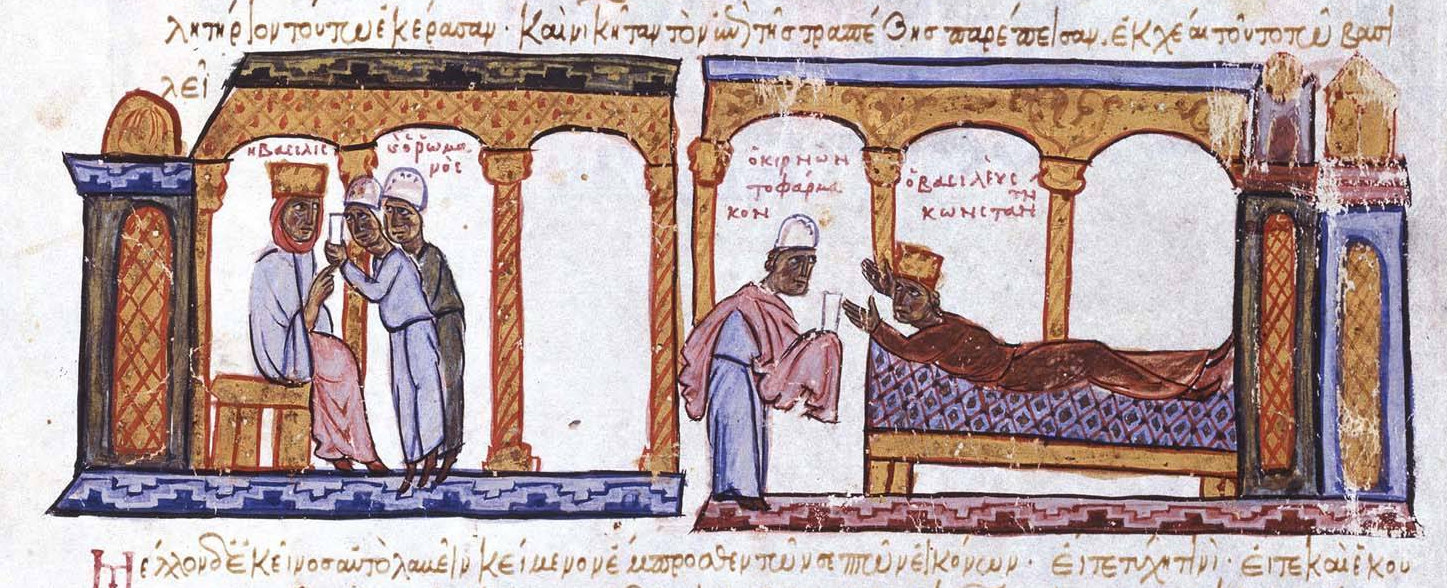
Theophano had to deal with bad rumors against her. Picture from the Skyllitzes Matritensis depicting Theophano poisoning her father-in-law, Emperor Constantine VII

Theophano was born of Laconian Greek origin in the Peloponnesian region of Lakonia, possibly in the city of Sparta, in 941. Theophano was originally named Anastasia, or more familiarly Anastaso and was the daughter of a poor tavern-keeper called Craterus. Theophano was renowned for her great beauty and heir apparent Romanos fell in love with her around the year 956 and married her against the wishes of his father, Emperor Constantine VII.

Theophano's humble origins made her unpopular among Byzantine elites and when her father-in-law Constantine VII died, rumors were spread alleging that she had poisoned him. Constantine died in 959 of a fever which lasted several months, not showing evidence of poisoning. Astute and intelligent, Theophano had influence with her husband, Romanos, an influence resented and likely exaggerated by her rivals in the court.

== Regent ==
On March 15, 963, Emperor Romanos II died unexpectedly at the age of twenty-five. Again, Theophano was rumored to have poisoned him, although she had nothing to gain and everything to lose from this action and, indeed, was still in bed only 48 hours after giving birth to Anna Porphyrogenita when the emperor died. Their sons, Basil II and Constantine VIII, five and three years old, respectively, were the heirs and Theophano was named regent.

However, hereditary ascension was a matter of tradition, not law. Her power as empress regent was very unstable and the situation in the empire was also chaotic, from foreign troubles to threats from claimants to the throne. Theophano realized that, to secure her position and the future of her children, she would need a protector. Passing over a bevy of would-be suitors among Constantinople's courtiers, she made an alliance with Nikephoros Phokas, a celebrated military commander who had been proclaimed emperor by his army after the death of Romanos. In return for her hand, the childless Nikephoros gave his sacred pledge to protect her children and their interests. On August 14, supporters of Nikephoros took control of Constantinople over the resistance of Joseph Bringas, a eunuch palace official and former counselor of Romanos. Nikephoros was crowned on 16 August in the Hagia Sophia, and soon after married Empress Theophano, bolstering his legitimacy. With this marriage, Theophano relinquished her quasi-masculine sovereign role on the throne and withdrew to the domestic sphere. Although her formal standing during the reign of Nikephoros was more significant than during that of her husband Romanos, her actual influence diminished.

== Marriage to Nikephoros II Phokas ==
The marriage provoked some clerical opposition, aggravated by the tremendous enmity the arch-conservative Patriarch Polyeuctus felt towards the young upstart empress. Both Theophano and Nikephoros had previously been bereaved of a spouse, and the Orthodox Church only begrudgingly accepted remarriage. Polyeuctus banned Nikephoros from kissing the holy altar until the emperor performed a penance for having remarried. Further complications arose when Nikephoros was alleged to have been godfather to one or more of Theophano's children, which placed the couple within a prohibited spiritual relationship. Nikephoros organised a council which nullified the relevant rules, on the grounds that they had been pronounced by the discredited iconoclast emperor Constantine V Copronymus. Polyeuctus did not accept the council as legitimate, and declared Nikephoros excommunicated until the emperor sent Theophano away. In response, Bardas Phokas and another person testified that Nikephoros was not in fact godfather to any of Theophano's children, at which Polyeuctus relented and allowed Nikephoros to return to full communion and keep Theophano as his wife.

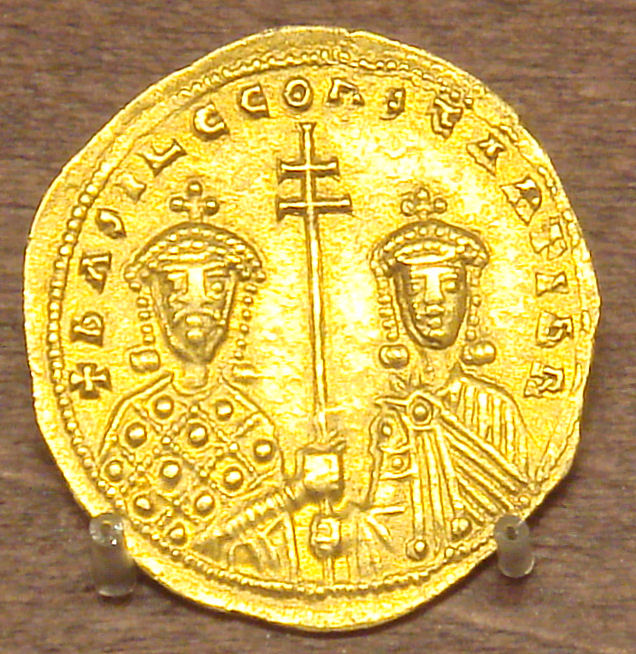
Histamenon of Basil II and Constantine VIII holding a cross

Nikephoros' gruff military style proved counterproductive in diplomacy and at court. Soon the empire was at war on multiple fronts, the heavy taxes needed to support the wars were widely unpopular particularly as they coincided with a few years of poor harvests which brought famine. When the emperor tried to relieve the suffering by limiting the wealth of the monasteries, he alienated the church. A widespread conspiracy developed to remove the emperor. On the night of 10 and 11 December 969, his nephew John I Tzimiskes (969–976) crossed the Bosphorus in a storm, was smuggled into the palace and allowed into the imperial chambers where he woke and killed his uncle.

John was good-looking and irrepressibly charming and the contemporary writers record that he and Theophano were lovers. They had come to an understanding on the conspiracy against the emperor. On the night of the assassination Theophano suspiciously left the imperial bedchamber, leaving the doors unbolted.

== Downfall ==
John now proposed to marry Theophano. However, the empress had by now been too damaged by gossip and rumors. Patriarch Polyeuctus refused to perform the coronation unless John punished those who had assisted him in the assassination, removed the "scarlet empress" from the court, and repealed all his predecessor's decrees that ran contrary to the interests of the church. John calculated that his legitimacy would be better enhanced by church approval than marriage to the unpopular empress and acceded to the patriarch's demands. Theophano was sent into exile to the island of Prinkipo (the largest of the Princes' Islands to the southeast of Constantinople, in the Sea of Marmara), but some sources identify the island as Prote (the closest of the Princes' Islands to the city).

== Return to court ==
Following the death of Tzimiskes in January 976, Theophano's teenage sons Basil and Constantine took sole power. One of the emperors' first acts was to recall their mother from exile.

She is last attested in the year 978, appealing to the retired Georgian general T'or'nik of Tao to broker an alliance with his former overlord Davit III of Tao to support her sons against the first revolt of the general Bardas Skleros. This seems to be the last reference to Theophano in any source, and it may be that she died relatively early in the reign of her sons.

== In literature ==
- English author Frederic Harrison wrote Theophano: The Crusade of the Tenth Century (1904).
- The Greek historical-fiction writer Kostas Kyriazis (b. 1920) wrote a biography called Theophano (1963), followed by the 1964 Basil Bulgaroktonus on her son.
- The Greek comic book writer Theocharis Spyros wrote a graphic novel, illustrated by Chrysa Sakel, called Theophano: A Byzantine Tale (2020). ISBN 979-8-6680-7148-7
- Theophano appears in Jonathan Harris's Theosis (2023). ISBN 979-8-6680-7148-7

== Sources ==
- History of the Byzantine State by Georgije Ostrogorski.
- Byzantium: The Apogee by John Julius Norwich.

Royal titles
Preceded by Helena Lekapene	Byzantine Empress consort 956–963; 963–969 with Helena Lekapene (956–959)	Succeeded by Theodora
