= Vladimir the Great =

Grand Prince of Kiev from 978 to 1015

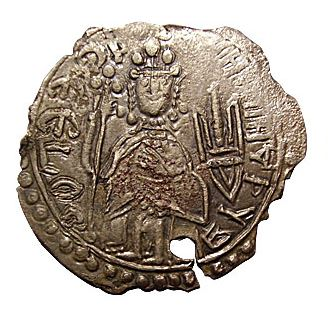
- Vladimir's effigy on one of his coins. He is crowned in the Byzantine style, holding a cross-mounted staff in one hand and a trident (tryzub) in the other.

Grand Prince of Kiev
- Reign: 11 June 978 – 15 July 1015
- Predecessor: Yaropolk I
- Successor: Sviatopolk I

Prince of Novgorod
- Reign: 970 – c. 988
- Predecessor: Sviatoslav I
- Successor: Vysheslav
- Born: c. 958; Budnik or Budiatychi
- Died: 15 July 1015 (aged approximately 57); Berestove
- Burial: Church of the Tithes, Kiev
- Spouse: Allogia; Rogneda of Polotsk; Adela; Malfrida; Anna Porphyrogenita
- Issue among others: Vysheslav of Novgorod; Iziaslav of Polotsk; Sviatopolk I; Yaroslav the Wise; Mstislav of Chernigov; Saint Boris; Saint Gleb; Sudislav; Maria Dobroniega of Kiev; Agatha (possible)
Names
- Vladimir Sviatoslavich
- Dynasty: Rurik
- Father: Sviatoslav I of Kiev
- Mother: Malusha
- Religion: Chalcedonian Christianity (from 988) prev. Slavic pagan

Saint Vladimir of Kiev
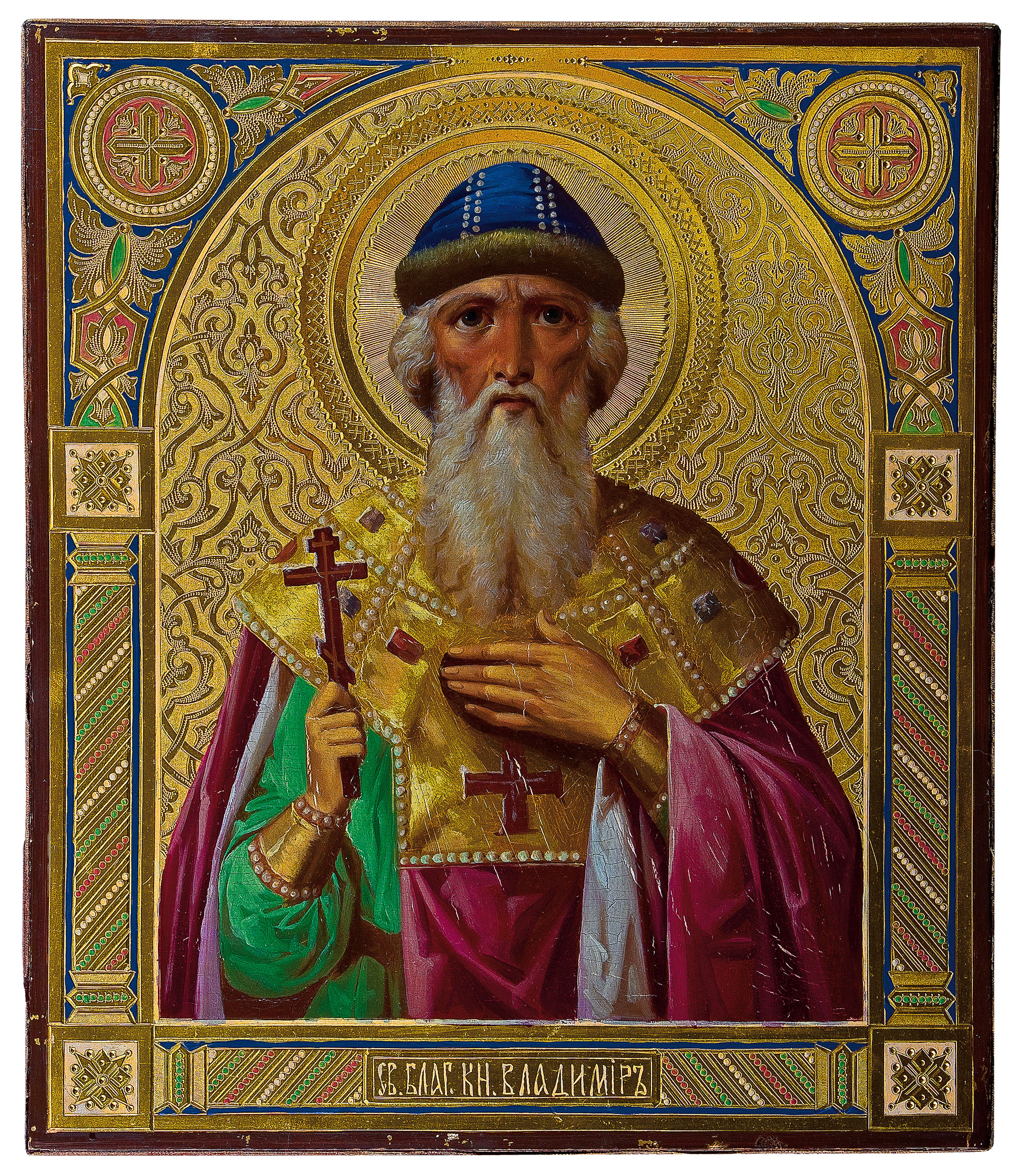

Equal to the Apostles
- Born: c. 958
- Died: 15 July 1015
- Venerated in: Eastern Orthodox Church; Catholic Church; Anglican Communion; Lutheranism
- Feast: 15 July
- Attributes: Crown, cross, throne

Vladimir I Sviatoslavich or Volodymyr I Sviatoslavych (Old East Slavic: Володимѣръ Свѧтославичь, romanized: Volodiměr Svętoslavič; (Note: Volodiměrъ is an Old East Slavic form of the given name; this form was influenced and partially replaced by the Old Bulgarian (Old Church Slavonic) form Vladiměrъ (by folk etymology later also Vladimirъ; in modern East Slavic languages, the given name is rendered Belarusian: Уладзiмiр, Uladzimir, Russian: Владимир, Vladimir, Ukrainian: Володимир, Volodymyr. See Vladimir for details.) (Note: Russian: Владимир Святославич, Vladimir Svyatoslavich; Ukrainian: Володимир Святославич, Volodymyr Sviatoslavych; Belarusian: Уладзімір Святаславіч, Uladzimir Svyataslavich; Old Norse Valdamarr gamli) Christian name: Basil; c. 958 – 15 July 1015), given the epithet "the Great", was Prince of Novgorod from 970 and Grand Prince of Kiev from 978 until his death in 1015. The Catholic Church and the Eastern Orthodox Church both canonised him as Saint Vladimir.

Vladimir's father was Sviatoslav I of the Rurik dynasty. After the death of his father in 972, Vladimir, who was then the prince of Novgorod, was forced to flee abroad after his brother Yaropolk murdered his other brother Oleg in 977 to become the sole ruler of Rus'. Vladimir assembled a Varangian army and returned to depose Yaropolk in 978. By 980, Vladimir had consolidated his realm to the Baltic Sea and solidified the frontiers against incursions of Bulgarians, Baltic tribes and Eastern nomads. Originally a follower of Slavic paganism, Vladimir converted to Christianity in 988 and Christianized the Kievan Rus.

== Name ==
Several scholars refer to Vladimir as Volodimer, also spelled Volodimir, (Note: According to historian Donald Ostrowski (2017), Russian scholars tend to prefer "Vladimir", while Ukrainian scholars tend to prefer "Volodimer". However, "Volodimir" tends to occur as much in the primary sources as "Volodimer", and significantly more often than "Vladimir".) and his descendants as Volodimerovichi (sometimes in lieu of "Rurikids"). In the history of Scandinavia, Vladimir is also known as Valdemar or the Old Norse form Valdamarr (see Waldemar).

== Rise to power ==
Born in 958, Vladimir was the illegitimate and youngest son of Sviatoslav I of Kiev by his housekeeper Malusha. Malusha is described in the Norse sagas as a prophetess who lived to the age of 100 and was brought from her cave to the palace to predict the future. Malusha's brother Dobrynya was Vladimir's tutor and most trusted advisor. Hagiographic tradition of dubious authenticity also connects his childhood with the name of his grandmother, Olga of Kiev, who was Christian and governed the capital during Sviatoslav's frequent military campaigns.

Transferring his capital to Pereyaslavets, Sviatoslav designated Vladimir ruler of Novgorod the Great in 970, but gave Kiev to his legitimate son Yaropolk. After Sviatoslav's death at the hands of the Pechenegs in 972, a fratricidal war erupted in 977 between Yaropolk and his younger brother Oleg, ruler of the Drevlians; Vladimir fled abroad and assembled a Varangian army to assist him in deposing Yaropolk, against whom he marched on his return the next year. On his way to Kiev he sent ambassadors to Rogvolod (Norse: Ragnvald), prince of Polotsk, to sue for the hand of his daughter Rogneda (Norse: Ragnhild). The high-born princess refused to affiance herself to the son of a bondswoman (and was betrothed to Yaropolk), so Vladimir attacked Polotsk, took Ragnhild by force, and put her parents to the sword. Polotsk was a key fortress on the way to Kiev, and capturing it along with Smolensk facilitated the taking of Kiev in 978, where he slew Yaropolk by treachery and was proclaimed knyaz of all Kievan Rus'.

== Years of pagan rule ==
Vladimir continued to expand his territories beyond his father's extensive domain. In 981, he seized the Cherven towns from the Duchy of Poland; in 981–982, he suppressed a Vyatichi rebellion; in 983, he subdued the Yatvingians; in 984, he conquered the Radimichs; and in 985, he conducted a military campaign against the Volga Bulgars, planting numerous fortresses and colonies on his way.

Although Christianity had spread in the region under Oleg's rule, Vladimir had remained a thoroughgoing pagan, taking eight hundred concubines (along with numerous wives) and erecting pagan statues and shrines to gods.

He may have attempted to reform Slavic paganism in an attempt to identify himself with the various gods worshipped by his subjects. He built a pagan temple on a hill in Kiev dedicated to six gods: Perun—the god of thunder and war, a god favored by members of the prince's druzhina (military retinue); Slavic gods Stribog and Dazhd'bog; Mokosh—a goddess representing Mother Nature "worshipped by Finnish tribes"; Khors and Simargl, "both of which had Iranian origins, were included, probably to appeal to the Poliane".

Open abuse of the deities that most people in Rus' revered triggered widespread indignation. A mob killed the Christian Fyodor and his son Ioann (later, after the overall Christianisation of Kievan Rus', people came to regard these two as the first Christian martyrs in Rus', and the Orthodox Church set a day to commemorate them, 25 July). Immediately after said murder, early medieval Rus' saw persecutions against Christians, many of whom escaped or concealed their belief. (Note: In 983, after another of his military successes, Prince Vladimir and his army thought it necessary to sacrifice human lives to the gods. A lot was cast and it fell on a youth, Ioann by name, the son of a Christian, Fyodor. His father stood firmly against his son being sacrificed to the idols. Further, he tried to show the pagans the futility of their faith: "Your gods are just plain wood: it is here now but it may rot into oblivion tomorrow; your gods neither eat, nor drink, nor talk and are made by human hand from wood; whereas there is only one God – He is worshiped by Greeks and He created heaven and earth; and your gods? They have created nothing, for they have been created themselves; never will I give my son to the devils!")

However, Prince Vladimir mused over the incident long after, and not least for political considerations. According to the early Slavic chronicle, the Tale of Bygone Years, which describes life in Kievan Rus' up to the year 1110, he sent his envoys throughout the world to assess first-hand the major religions of the time: Islam, Latin Christianity, Judaism, and Byzantine Christianity. They were most impressed with their visit to Constantinople, saying, "We knew not whether we were in Heaven or on Earth ... We only know that God dwells there among the people, and their service is fairer than the ceremonies of other nations."

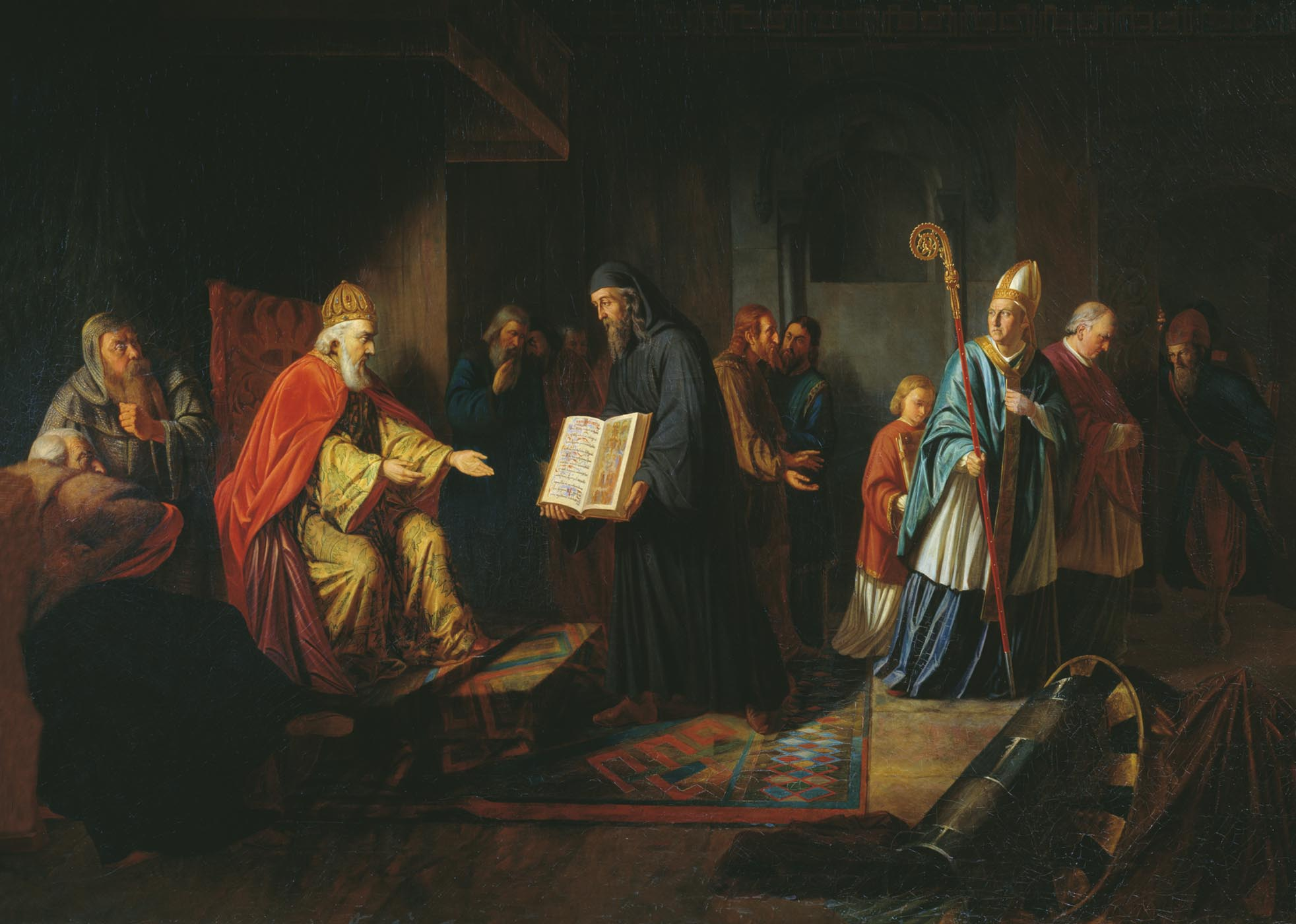
Prince Vladimir chooses a religion in 988 by Johann Leberecht Eggink (1822)

== Conversion ==
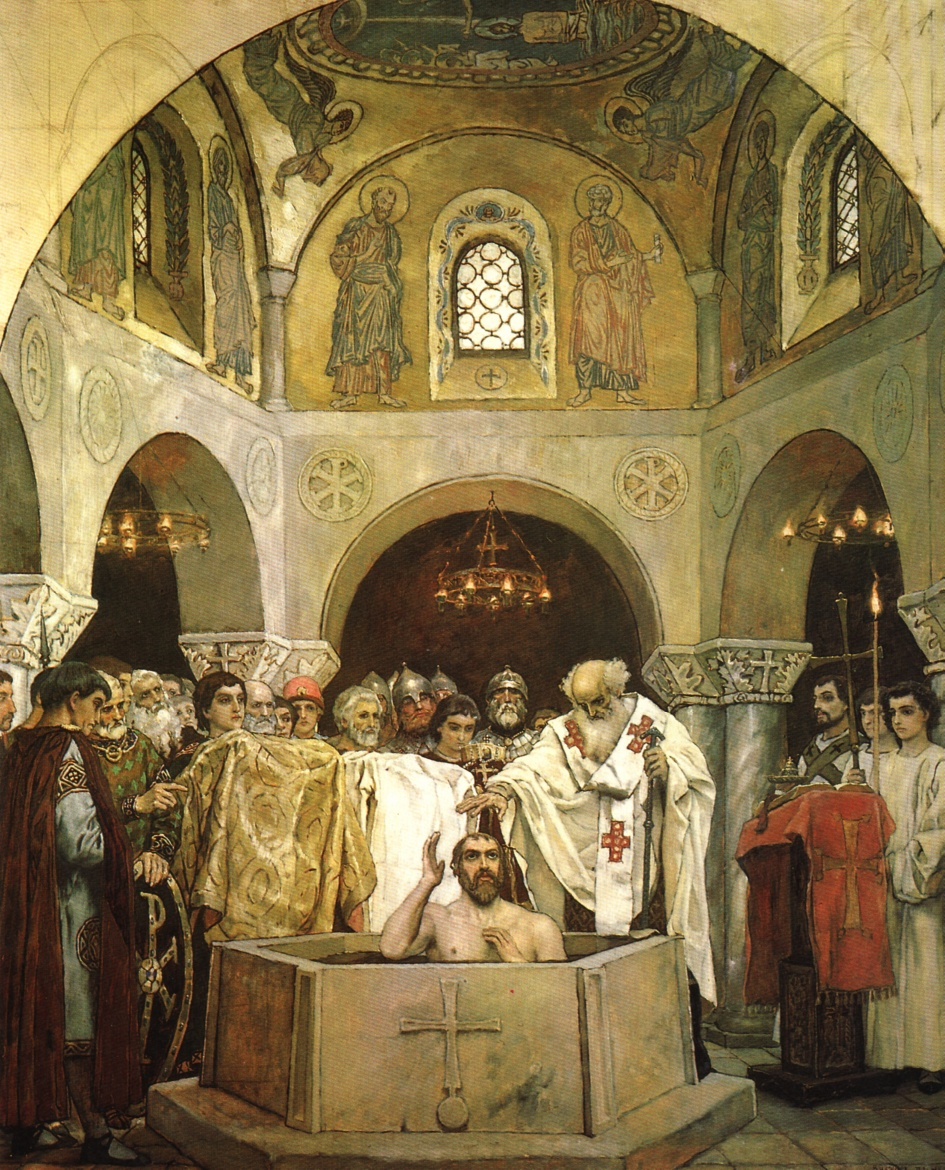
The Baptism of Saint Prince Vladimir by Viktor Vasnetsov (1890)

The Primary Chronicle reports that in the year 986, missionaries from various peoples representing various religions arrived in Kiev, trying to convert Vladimir to their religion. In 987, after consultation with his boyars, Vladimir reportedly sent envoys to study the religions of the various neighboring peoples whose representatives had been urging him to embrace their respective faiths. Although in both stories Vladimir ultimately rejects all options except Eastern Christianity, he hesitates and does not convert.

In 988, having taken the town of Chersonesus in Crimea, he allegedly boldly negotiated for the hand of emperor Basil II's sister, Anna. Never before had a Byzantine imperial princess, and one "born in the purple", married a barbarian, as matrimonial offers of French kings and Holy Roman Emperors had been peremptorily rejected. In short, to marry the 27-year-old princess to a pagan Slav seemed impossible. Vladimir was baptized at Chersonesos, however, taking the Christian name of Basil out of compliment to his imperial brother-in-law; the sacrament was followed by his wedding to Anna.

Arab sources, both Muslim and Christian, present a different story of Vladimir's conversion. Yahya of Antioch, al-Rudhrawari, al-Makin, al-Dimashqi, and ibn al-Athir all give essentially the same account. In 987, Bardas Sclerus and Bardas Phocas revolted against the Byzantine emperor Basil II. Both rebels briefly joined forces, but then Bardas Phocas proclaimed himself emperor on 14 September 987. Basil II turned to the Kievan Rus' for assistance, even though they were considered enemies at that time. Vladimir agreed, in exchange for a marital tie; he also agreed to accept Christianity as his religion and to Christianize his people. When the wedding arrangements were settled, Vladimir dispatched 6,000 troops to the Byzantine Empire, and they helped to put down the revolt.

== Christianization of Kievan Rus' ==
Returning to Kiev in triumph, Vladimir destroyed pagan monuments and established many churches, starting with a church dedicated to St. Basil, and the Church of the Tithes (989).

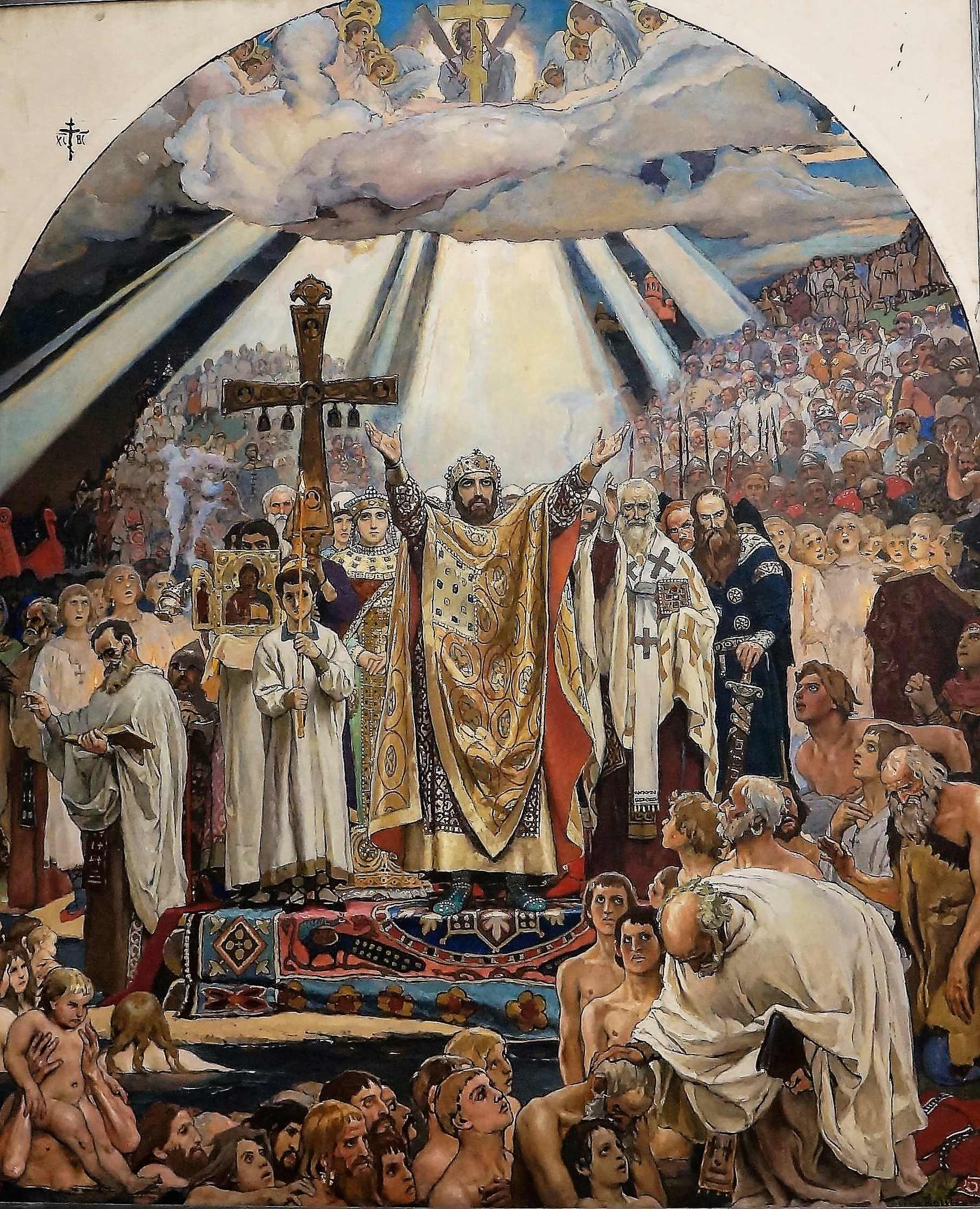
The Baptism of the Rus by Viktor Vasnetsov (1885–1896)

In 988 and 991, he baptized Pecheneg princes Metiga and Kuchug, respectively.

== Christian reign ==
Vladimir then formed a great council out of his boyars and set his twelve sons over his subject principalities. According to the Primary Chronicle, he founded the city of Belgorod in 991. In 992, he went on a campaign against the Croats, most likely the White Croats that lived on the border of modern Ukraine. This campaign was cut short by the attacks of the Pechenegs on and around Kiev.

During his Christian reign, Vladimir lived the teachings of the Bible through acts of charity. He would hand out food and drink to the less fortunate, and made an effort to go out to the people who could not reach him. His work was based on the impulse to help one's neighbors by sharing the burden of carrying their cross. He founded numerous churches, including the Desyatynna Tserkva (Church, or Cathedral, of the Tithes) (989), established schools, protected the poor and introduced ecclesiastical courts. He lived mostly at peace with his neighbors, the incursions of the Pechenegs alone disturbing his tranquility.

He introduced the Byzantine law code into his territories following his conversion but reformed some of its harsher elements; he notably abolished capital punishment, along with judicial torture and mutilation. According to chronicles, immediately following the Christianization of Rus', the prince ordered the children of nobles to be educated, and in the following decades literacy became widespread in various parts of Rus', leading to the emergence of first native works of literature.

In his later years he lived in relative peace with his other neighbors: Bolesław I of Poland, Stephen I of Hungary, and Andrikh the Czech (a shadowy figure mentioned in A Tale of the Bygone Years). After Anna's death, he married again, likely to a granddaughter of Otto the Great.

In 1014, his son Yaroslav the Wise stopped paying tribute. Vladimir decided to chastise the insolence of his son and began gathering troops against him. Vladimir fell ill, however, most likely of old age, and died at Berestove, near modern-day Kiev. The various parts of his dismembered body were distributed among his numerous sacred foundations and were venerated as relics.

== Family ==
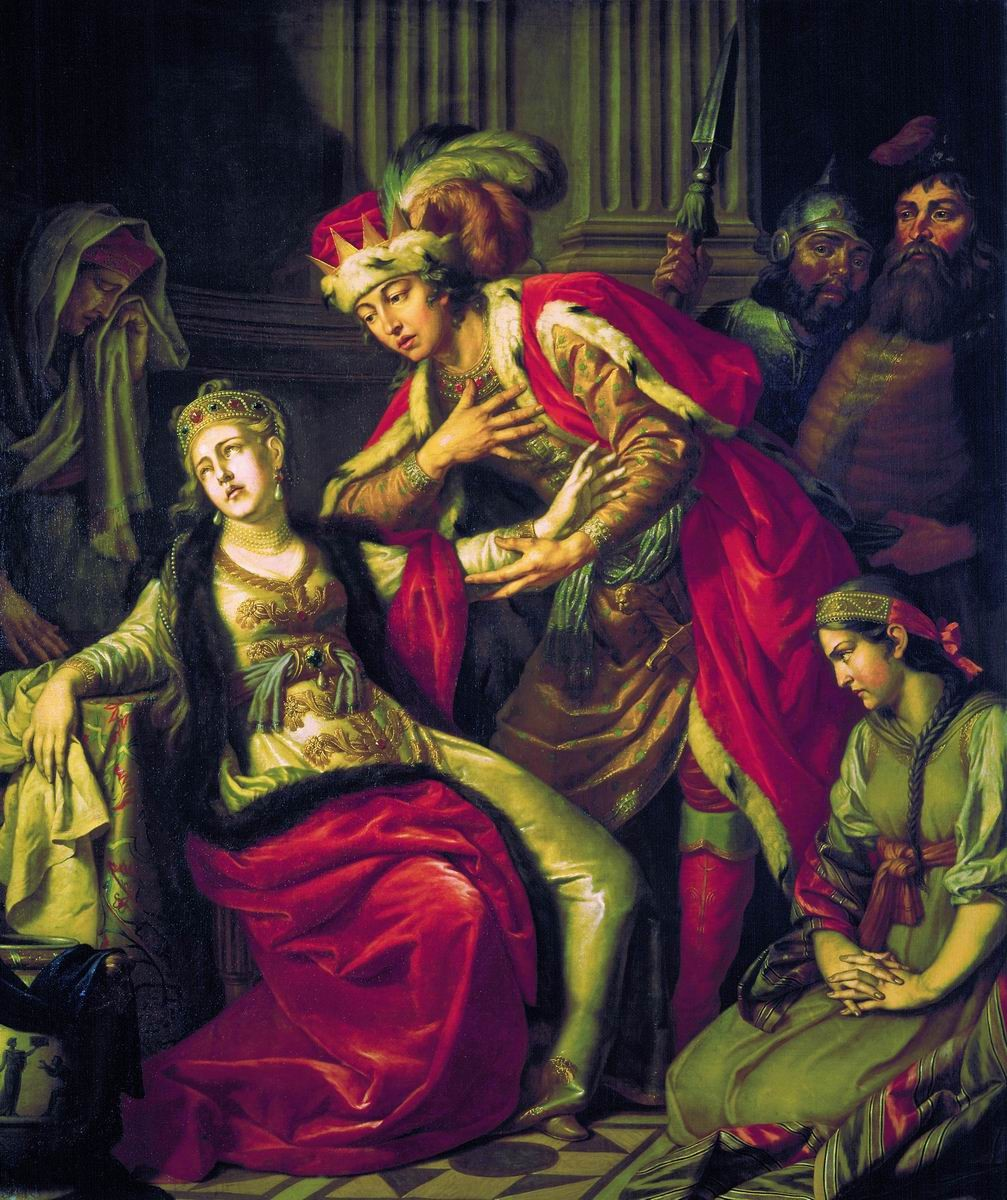
Vladimir and Rogneda (1770)

The fate of all Vladimir's daughters, whose number is around nine, is uncertain. His wives, concubines, and their children were as follows:

- Olava or Allogia (Varangian or Czech), speculative; she might have been mother of Vysheslav while others claim that it is a confusion with Helena Lekapene
  - Vysheslav (c. 977 – c. 1010), Prince of Novgorod (988–1010)
- Irina, a widow of Yaropolk I, a Greek nun
  - Sviatopolk the Accursed (born c. 979), possibly the surviving son of Yaropolk
- Rogneda (the daughter of Rogvolod); later upon divorce she entered a convent taking the Christian name of Anastasia
  - Izyaslav of Polotsk (born c. 979, Kiev), Prince of Polotsk (989–1001)
  - Yaroslav the Wise (no earlier than 983), Prince of Rostov (988–1010), Prince of Novgorod (1010–1034), Grand Prince of Kiev (1016–1018, 1019–1054). He was likely a son of Anna Porphyrogenita rather than Rogneda. Another interesting fact is that he was younger than Sviatopolk according to the words of Boris in the Tale of Bygone Years and not as it was officially known. A later analysis of his skeletal remains also corroborates this view.
  - Vsevolod (c. 984 – 1013), possibly the Swedish Prince Wissawald of Volhynia (c. 1000), was perhaps the first husband of Estrid Svendsdatter
  - Mstislav, distinct from Mstislav of Chernigov, possibly died as an infant, if he was ever born
  - Mstislav of Chernigov (born c. 983), Prince of Tmutarakan (990–1036), Prince of Chernigov (1024–1036), other sources claim him to be the son of other mothers (Adela, Malfrida, or some other Bulgarian wife)
  - Predslava, a concubine of Bolesław I Chrobry according to Gesta principum Polonorum
  - Premislava, (died 1015), some sources state that she was a wife of the Duke Laszlo (Vladislav) "the Bald" of the Arpadians
  - Mstislava, in 1018 was taken by Bolesław I Chrobry among the other daughters
- Bulgarian Adela, some sources claim that Adela is not necessarily Bulgarian as Boris and Gleb may have been born from some other wife
  - Boris (born c. 986), Prince of Rostov (c. 1010 – 1015), remarkable is the fact that the Rostov Principality as well as the Principality of Murom used to border the territory of the Volga Bolgars
  - Gleb (born c. 987), Prince of Murom (1013–1015), as is Boris, Gleb is also claimed to be the son of Anna Porphyrogenita.
  - Stanislav (born c. 985 – 1015), Prince of Smolensk (988–1015), possibly of another wife and the fate of whom is not certain
  - Sudislav (died 1063), Prince of Pskov (1014–1036), possibly of another wife, but he is mentioned in Nikon's Chronicles. He spent 35 years in prison and later became a monk.
- Malfrida
  - Sviatoslav (c. 982 – 1015), Prince of Drevlians (990–1015)
- Anna Porphyrogenita
  - Theophana, a wife of Novgorod posadnik Ostromir, a grandson of semi-legendary Dobrynya (highly doubtful is the fact of her being Anna's offspring)
- a granddaughter of Otto the Great (possibly Rechlinda Otona [Regelindis])
  - Maria Dobroniega of Kiev (born c. 1012), the Duchess of Poland (1040–1087), married around 1040 to Casimir I the Restorer, Duke of Poland, her maternity as daughter of this wife is deduced from her apparent age
- other possible family
  - Vladimirovna, an out-of-marriage daughter (died 1044), married to Bernard, Margrave of the Nordmark.
  - Pozvizd (born prior to 988), a son of Vladimir according to Hustyn Chronicles. He, possibly, was the Prince Khrisokhir mentioned by Niketas Choniates.

== Significance and legacy ==
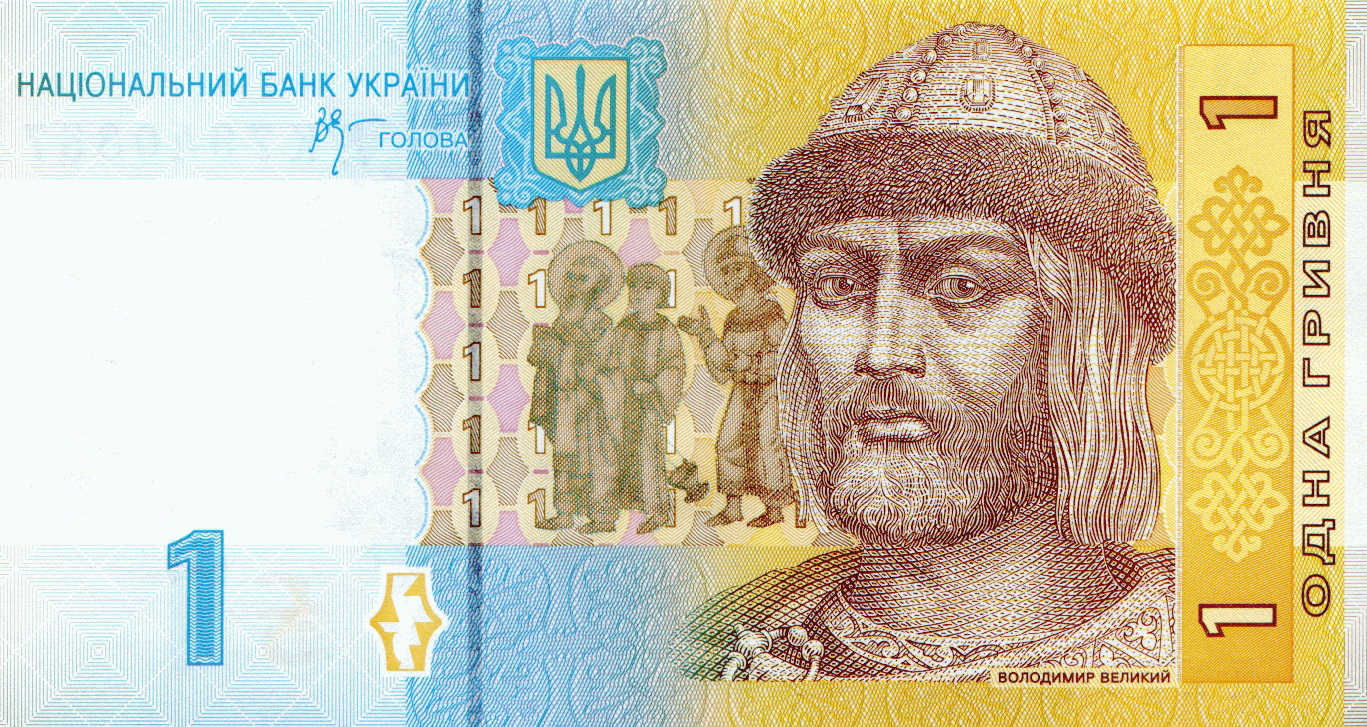
Volodymyr the Great portrait on obverse of ₴1 bill, circa 2006

Despite being widely celebrated in Rus' chronicles, Vladimir's baptism is barely mentioned by contemporary Byzantine sources. This led historians to a conclusion, that the canonical story of the prince's adoption of Christianity is a product of a latter period, namely the 1040s, when the idea of Rus' church as an independent and equal to the Byzantine one became popular. Despite the fact that the first documented Rus' prince to adopt Christianity was Askold during the 860s, authors of the latter era elevated Vladimir as the "first Baptist" of his land, and compared him to Roman Emperor Constantine the Great.

The Eastern Orthodox, Byzantine Rite Lutheran and Roman Catholic churches celebrate the feast day of St. Vladimir on 15/28 July.

The town Volodymyr in north-western Ukraine was founded by Vladimir and is named after him. The foundation of another town, Vladimir in Russia, is usually attributed to Vladimir Monomakh. However some researchers argue that it was also founded by Vladimir the Great.

St Volodymyr's Cathedral, one of the largest cathedrals in Kyiv, is dedicated to Vladimir the Great, as was originally the Kyiv University. The Imperial Russian Order of St. Vladimir and Saint Vladimir's Orthodox Theological Seminary in the United States are also named after him.

The memory of Vladimir was also kept alive by innumerable Russian folk ballads and legends, which refer to him as Krasno Solnyshko (the Fair Sun, or the Red Sun; Красно Солнышко in Russian). The Varangian period of Eastern Slavic history ceases with Vladimir, and the Christian period begins.

The appropriation of Kievan Rus' as part of national history has also been a topic of contention in Ukrainophile vs. Russophile schools of historiography since the Soviet era. Today, he is regarded as a symbol in Belarus, Russia and Ukraine.

All branches of the economy prospered under Vladimir. He minted coins and regulated foreign affairs with other countries, such as trade, bringing in Greek wines, Baghdad spices, and Arabian horses for the markets of Kiev.

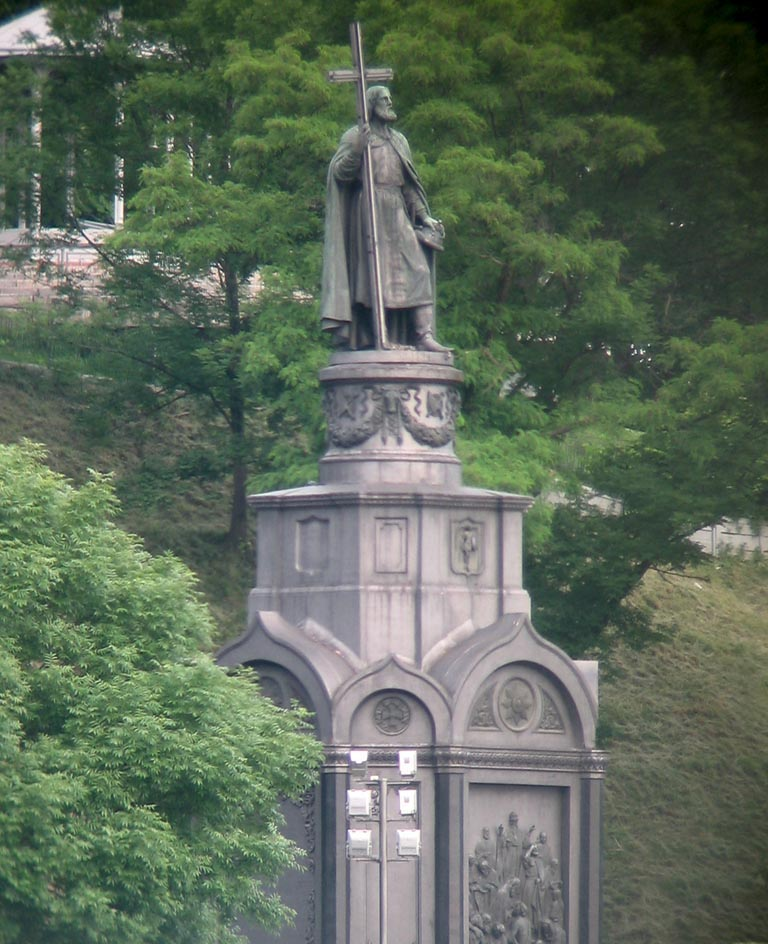
Monument to Volodymyr the Great in Kyiv

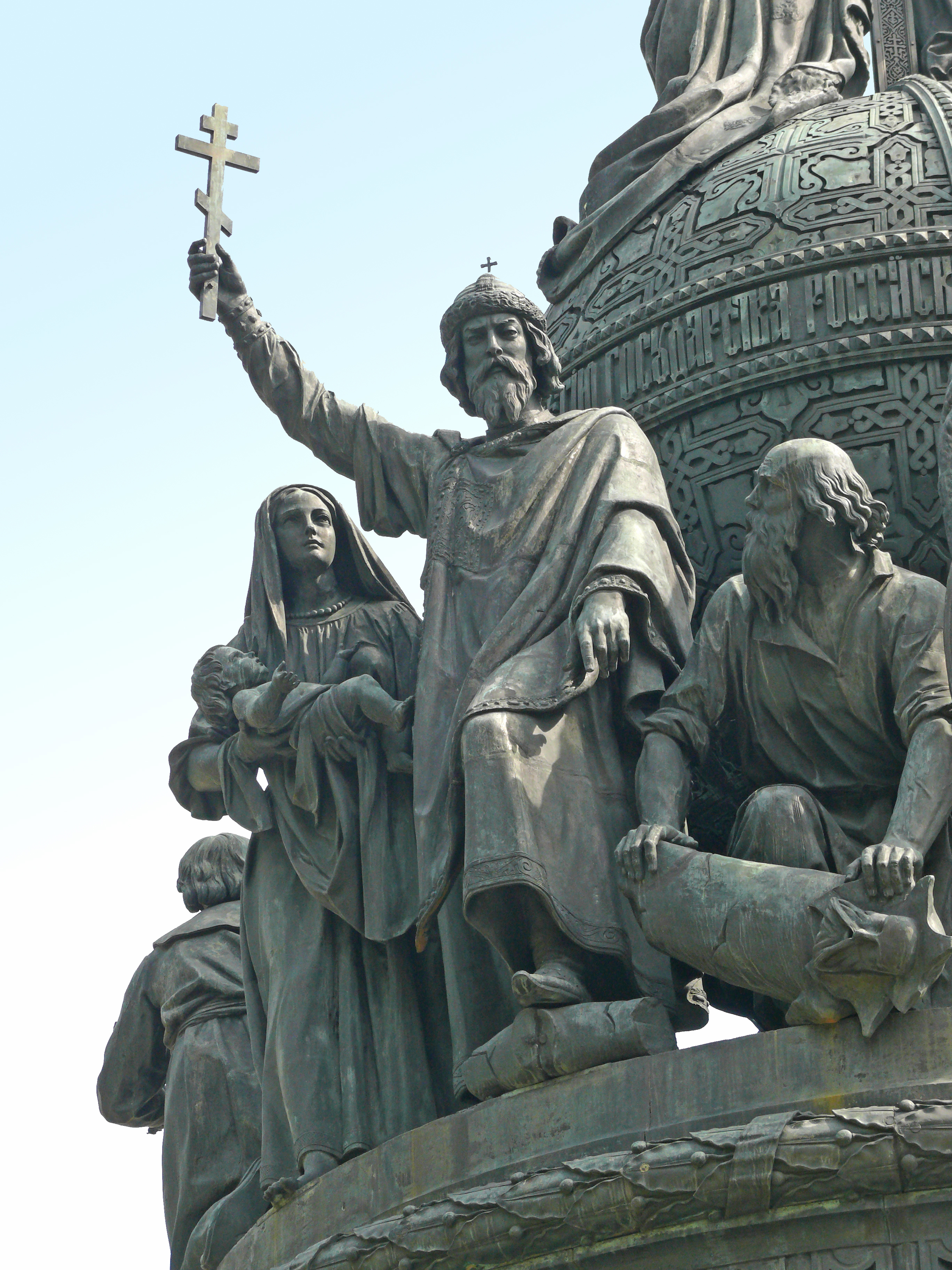
Vladimir the Great on the Millennium of Russia monument in Novgorod

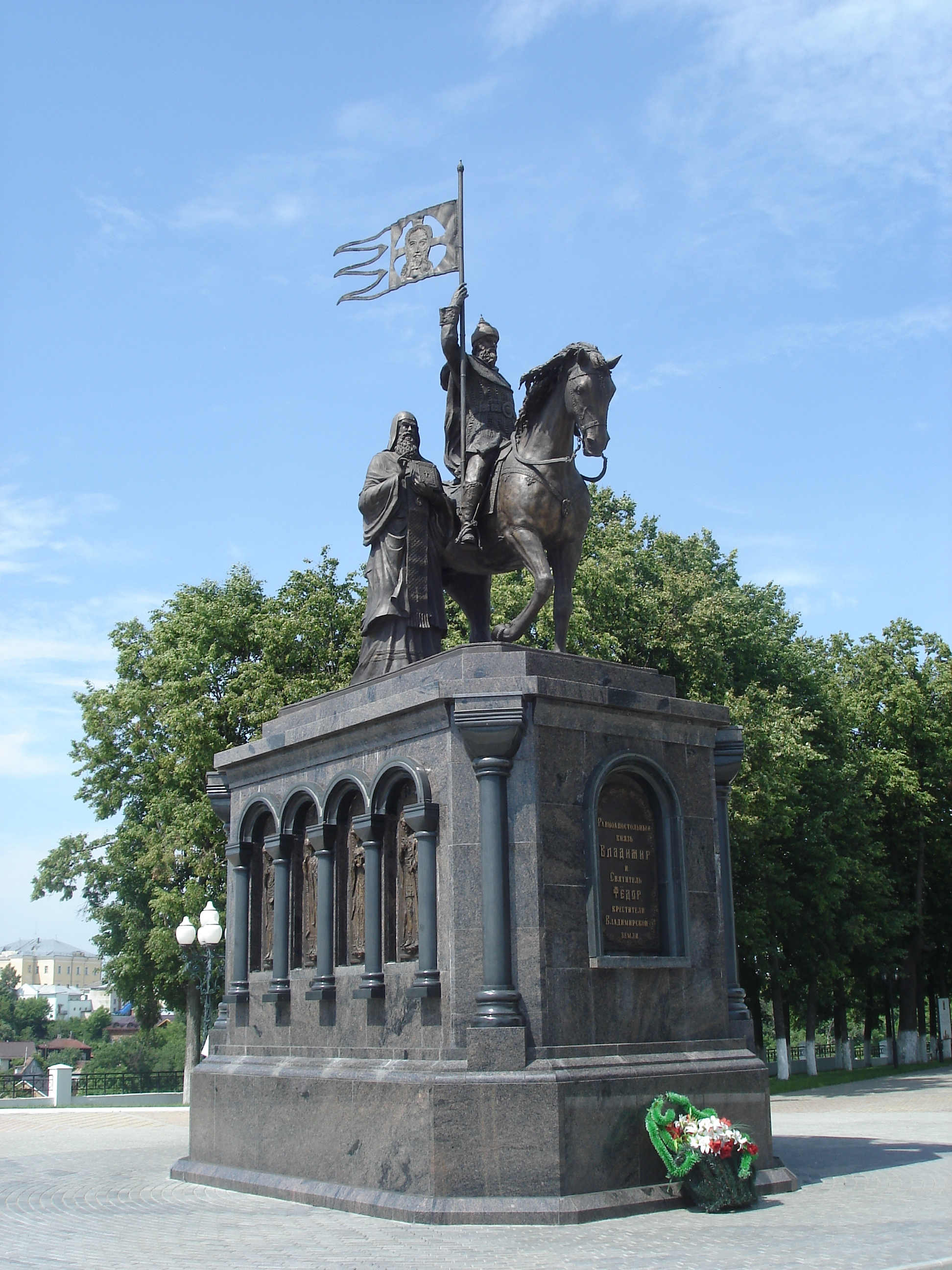
Monument to Vladimir the Great and the monk Fyodor at Pushkin Park in Vladimir, Russia

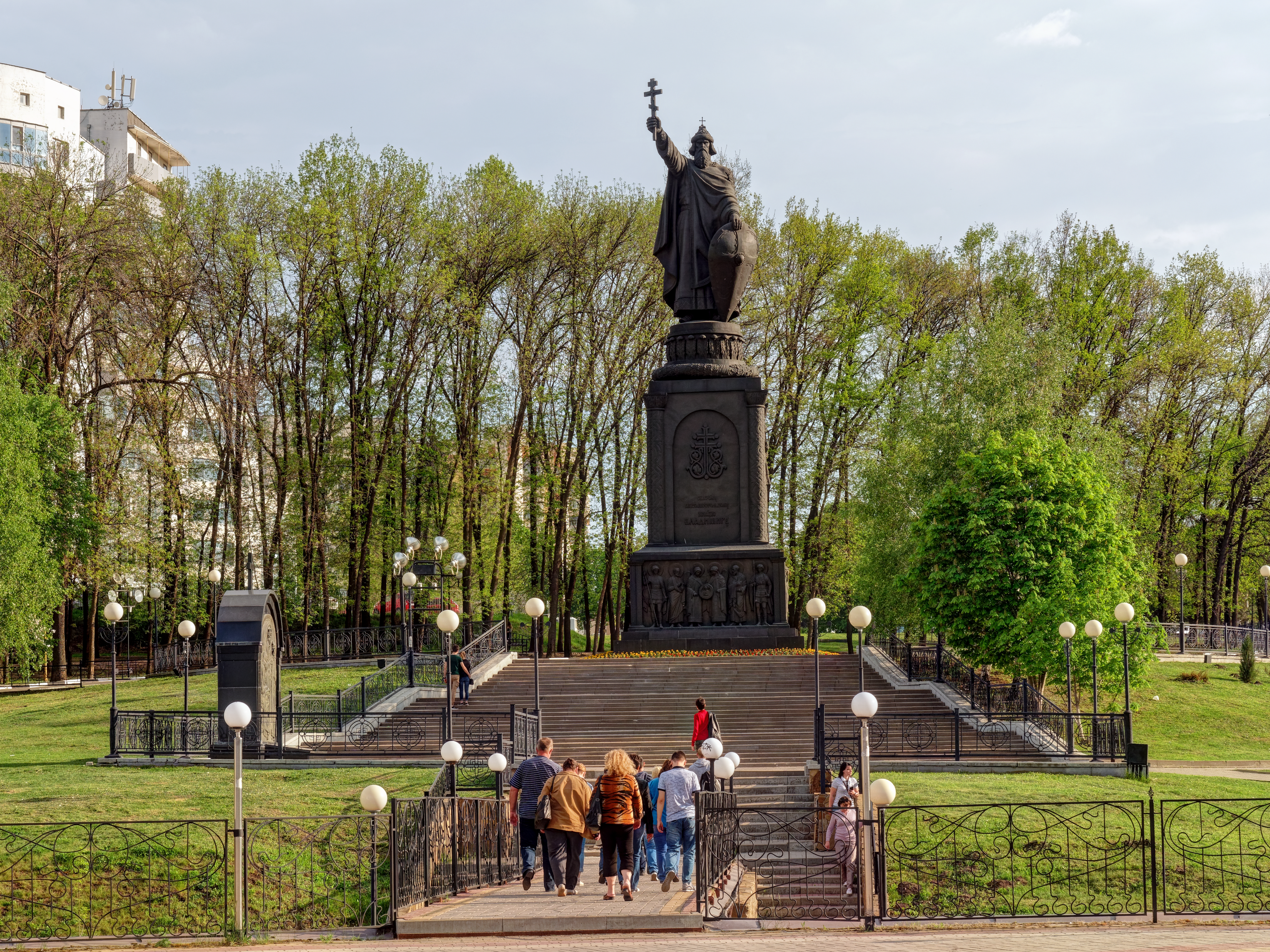
St Vladimir the Great Monument in Belgorod, Russia

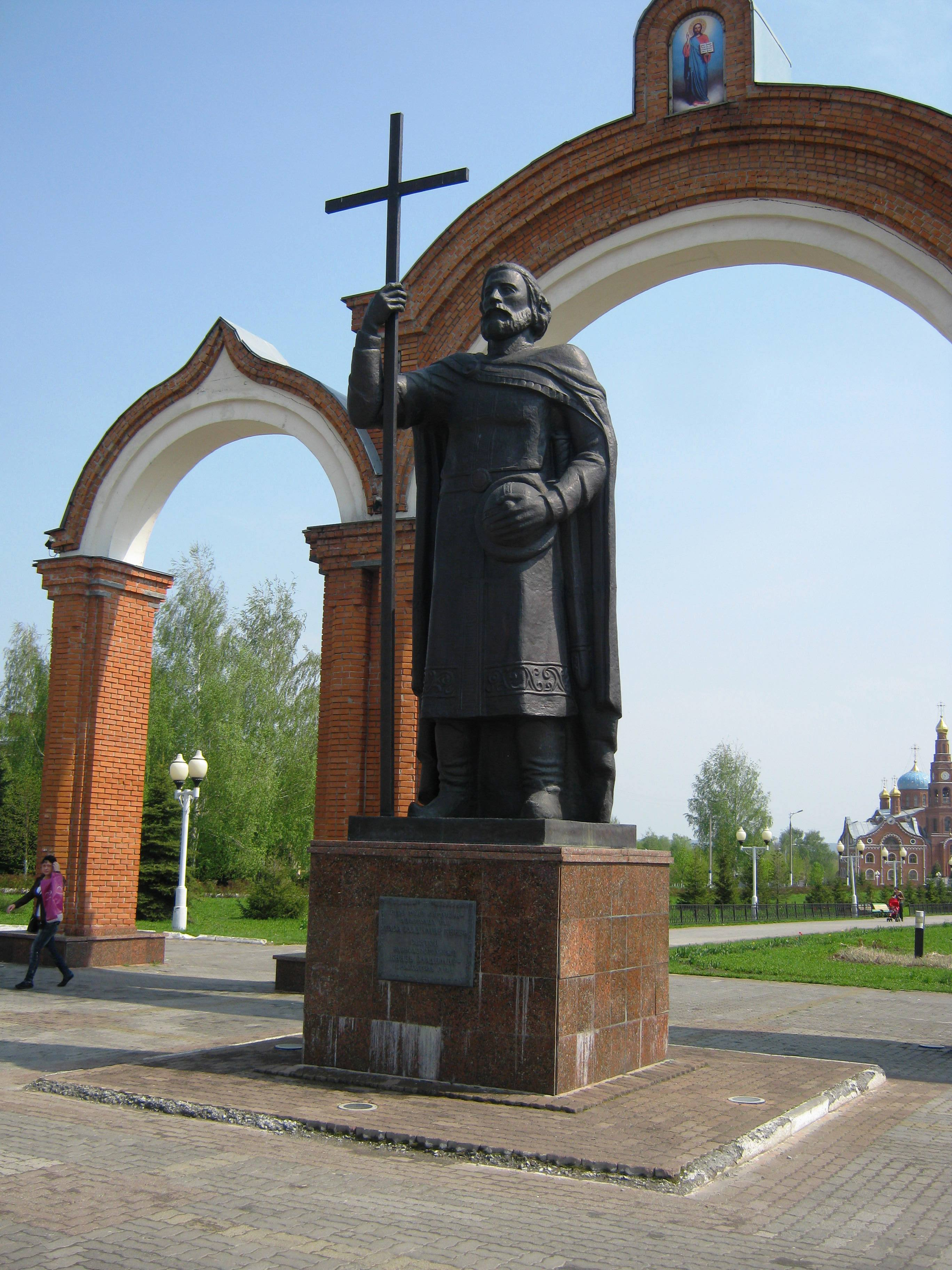
Monument to Prince Vladimir (Novocheboksarsk)

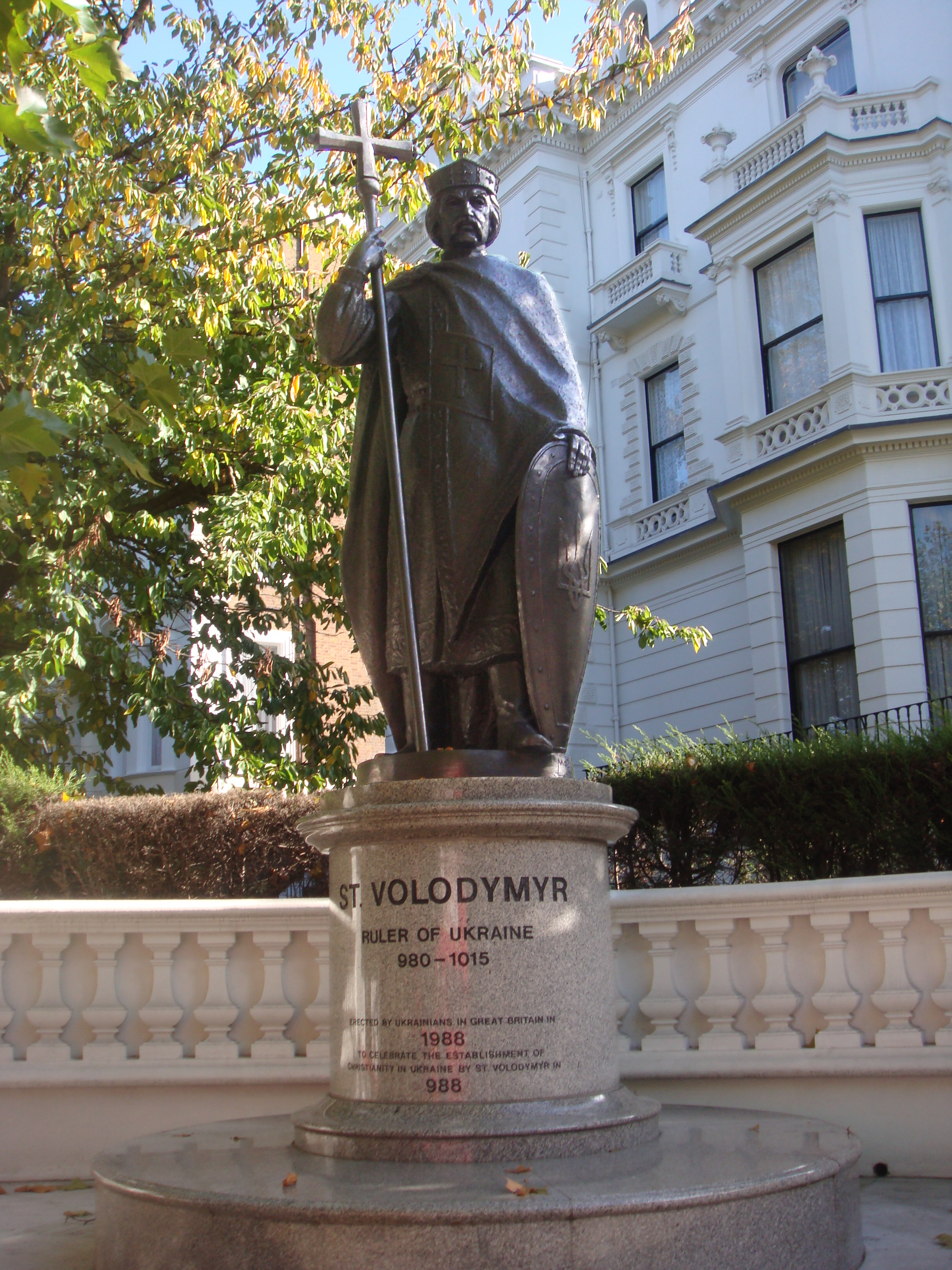
Statue in London, erected by Ukrainians in Great Britain in 1988 to celebrate the establishment of Christianity in Ukraine by St. Volodymyr in 988

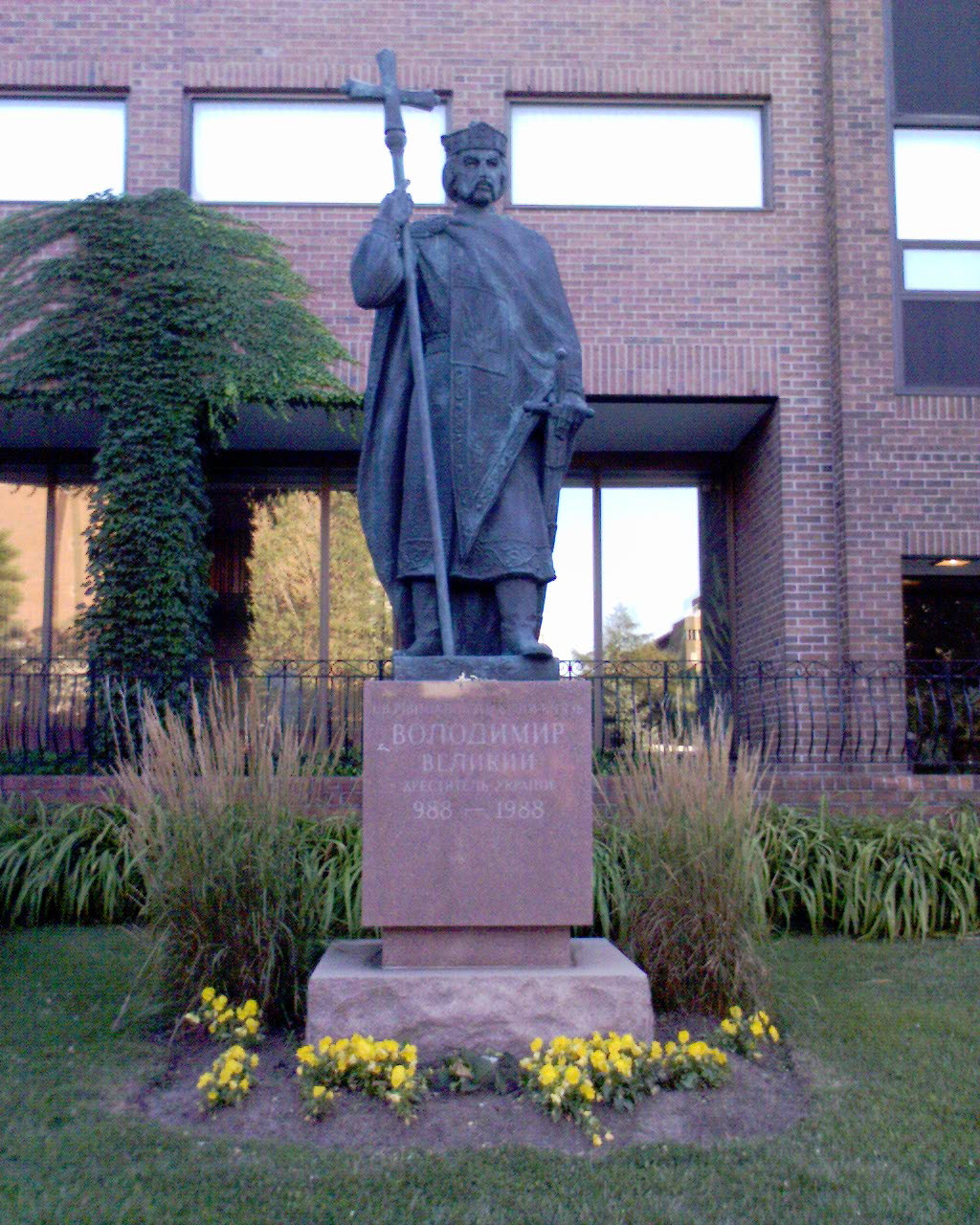
Statue in Toronto erected by Ukrainians in Canada in 1988 to celebrate the establishment of Christianity in Ukraine by St. Volodymyr in 988

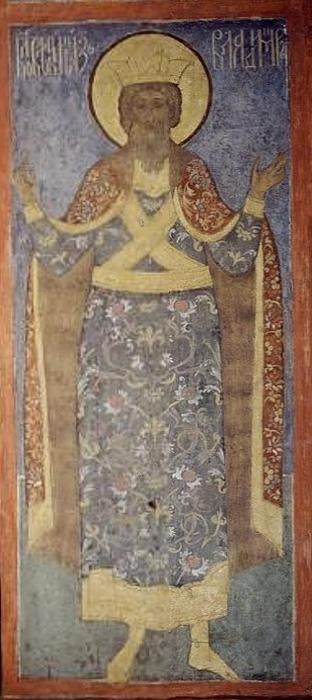
Fresco of Saint Vladimir in the Archangel Cathedral in Moscow

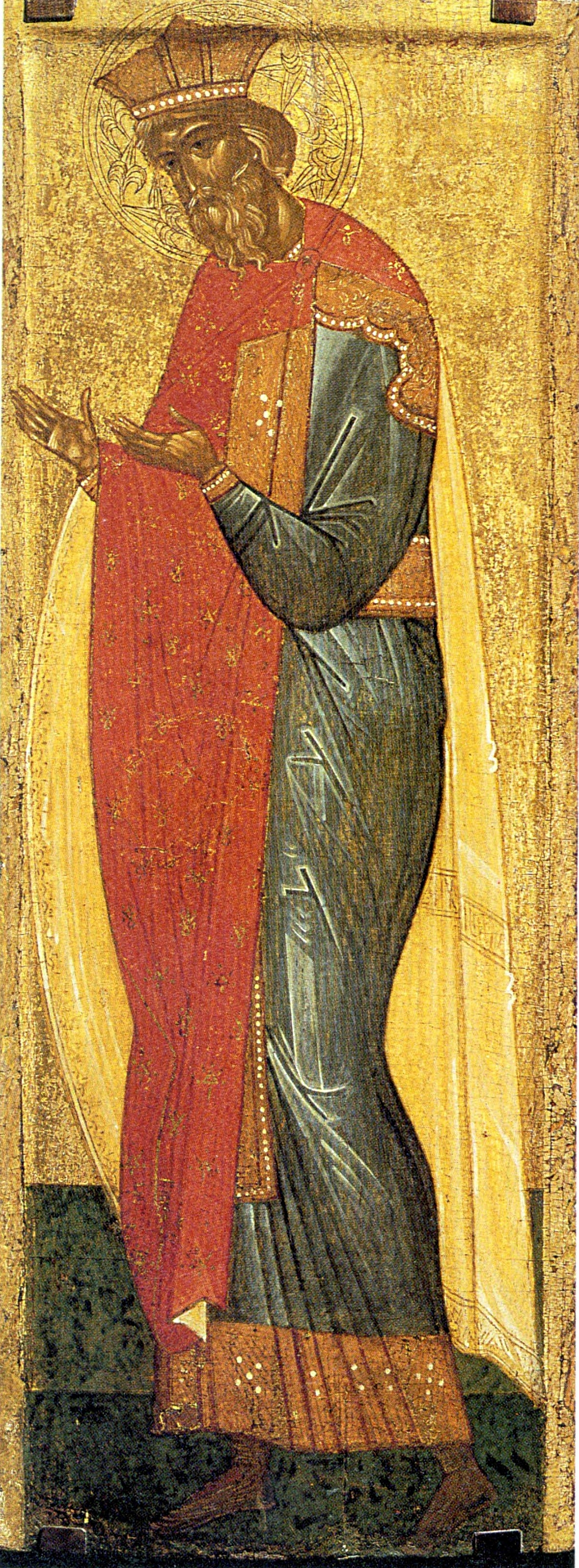
Icon of Saint Vladimir from a Deeis Tier from Novgorod (15th Century)

== See also ==
- Order of Saint Vladimir
- List of people known as the Great
- Prince Vladimir, Russian animated feature film (2006)
- Viking, Russian historical film (2016), where Vladimir the Great is portrayed by Danila Kozlovsky

== Bibliography ==
- Golden, P. B. (2006) "Rus." Encyclopaedia of Islam (Brill Online). Eds.: P. Bearman, Th. Bianquis, C. E. Bosworth, E. van Donzel and W. P. Heinrichs. Brill.
- Franklin, Simon (1991). "Ilarion's "Sermon on Law and Grace"". Sermons and Rhetoric of Kievan Rus' (PDF). University of Toronto (SLA 218 Ukrainian Literature and Culture). p. 30. Archived from the original (PDF) on 15 March 2023.
- Halperin, Charles J. (2022). The Rise and Demise of the Myth of the Rus' Land (PDF). Leeds: Arc Humanities Press. p. 107. ISBN 9781802700565.
- Some historical analysis and political insights on the state affairs of Vladimir the Great (in Russian)
- Moss, Walter (2002). A History of Russia. London: Anthem. ISBN 978-1-84331-023-5. OCLC 53250380.
- Ostrowski, Donald (2006). "The Account of Volodimer's Conversion in the "Povest' vremennykh let": A Chiasmus of Stories". Harvard Ukrainian Studies. 28 (1–4). Harvard Ukrainian Research Institute: 567–580. JSTOR 41036982.
- Ostrowski, Donald (2018). "Was There a Riurikid Dynasty in Early Rus'?". Canadian-American Slavic Studies. 52 (1): 30–49. doi:10.1163/22102396-05201009.
- Raffensperger, Christian (2016). Ties of Kinship: Genealogy and Dynastic Marriage in Kyivan Rus'. Cambridge, Massachusetts: Harvard Ukrainian Research Institute. p. 418. ISBN 9781932650136.

Vladimir I of Kiev Rurik Born: 958 Died: 15 July 1015
Regnal titles
Preceded by ?	Prince of Novgorod; 969–977	Succeeded by ?
Preceded by Yaropolk I Sviatoslavich	Grand Prince of Kiev; 980–1015	Succeeded by Sviatopolk I
Titles in pretence
Preceded by Oleg of the Drevlyans	Prince of Kiev; 977–980	Succeeded by Vysheslav Vladimirovich
