= Dobrynya =

Vladimir the Great's maternal uncle and tutor

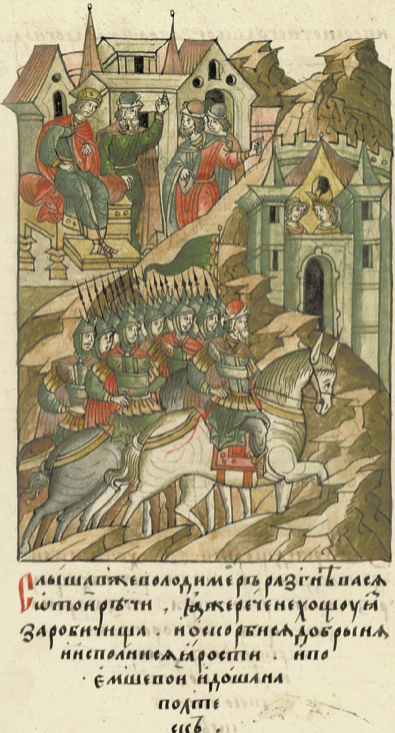
Dobrynya going to Polotsk

Dobrynya (Russian: Добрыня, Ukrainian: Добриня) was Vladimir the Great's maternal uncle and tutor. He was the historical prototype of the invincible bogatyr called Dobrynya Nikitich who appears in Russian folklore (byliny).

Dobrynya's life and extent of his influence on Vladimir are shrouded in speculation and controversy. It is fairly certain that his sister Malusha was Vladimir's mother. It is also generally accepted that Dobrynya's posadnik dynasty in Novgorod was continued by his son Konstantin Dobrynich and grandson Ostromir.

According to the Novgorod chronicles, it was at his urging that Sviatoslav I sent his illegitimate son, Vladimir, to govern Novgorod, with Dobrynya as his tutor. Nine years later, Dobrynya persuaded Vladimir to wrest Kiev from his brother Yaropolk. On their way to Kiev, Yaropolk's bride, Rogneda of Polotsk, offended Dobrynya by calling his sister a "bondswoman". Dobrynya took his revenge by arranging Rogneda's rape by Vladimir.

After Vladimir's enthronement in Kiev, Dobrynya returned to rule Novgorod in his name. He accompanied his nephew in the 985 expedition against Volga Bulgaria and, following his lead, erected an idol of Perun on the bank of the Volkhov River. After the Baptism of Kiev, he is said to have forced the Novgorodians into Christianity "by fire". Vasily Tatishchev wrote that Dobrynya, along with Bishop Ioakim Korsunianin, faced a violent, pagan mob which burned Dobrynya's house and killed his wife and several other family members.

== Sources ==
- "Добрыня" . Brockhaus and Efron Encyclopedic Dictionary (in Russian). 1906.
