= Malfrida =

Malfrida or Malfrid is the name of a woman who died in 1000 according to the Primary Chronicle (PVL).

Russian historian Vasily Tatishchev believe that Malfrida was a Bohemian wife of Vladimir I of Kiev. Other historians believe that Malfrida was identical to Malusha.

Malfrida may have bore two sons to Vladimir:

- Svyatoslav of Smolensk (d. 1015)
- Mstislav of Chernigov (d. 1036) - probably his mother was Rogneda of Polotsk.

== Bibliography ==
=== Primary sources ===
- Primary Chronicle (c. 1110s).
  - Cross, Samuel Hazzard; Sherbowitz-Wetzor, Olgerd P. (1953). The Russian Primary Chronicle, Laurentian Text. Translated and edited by Samuel Hazzard Cross and Olgerd P. Sherbowitz-Wetzor (PDF). Cambridge, Massachusetts: The Mediaeval Academy of America. p. 325.
  - Ostrowski, Donald; Birnbaum, David J. (7 December 2014). "Rus' primary chronicle critical edition – Interlinear line-level collation". pvl.obdurodon.org (in Church Slavic). Archived from the original on 28 April 2025.
