= Kyiv (disambiguation) =

Kyiv is the capital of Ukraine, also known by its Russian-based name Kiev.

Kyiv or Kiev may also refer to:

== Places ==
- Principality of Kiev, a successor of the Kievan Rus' state
- Kyiv Oblast, an oblast (province) of Ukraine
- Kyivskyi District, Donetsk, an urban district in Donetsk, Ukraine
- Kyiv Peninsula, a peninsula in the Antarctic
- 2171 Kiev, a minor planet

== Music ==
- Kiev (band), an American indie rock band
- "Kyiv", a song by Tom Misch and Yussef Dayes from the 2020 album What Kinda Music
- "Kyiv", a song from Better Than Going Under (2023) by Lebanon Hanover

== Radio stations ==
- KIEV-LP, Outlaw Country Radio FM radio station in Camas, Washington, US
- KRLA (former call letters: KIEV 870), a radio station in Los Angeles, California, US
- KROQ (1500 AM) (former call letters: KIEV 1500), a former radio station in Culver City, California, US

== Food ==
- Chicken Kiev, a chicken-based dish
- Kiev Restaurant, a former restaurant in New York City
- Kyiv cake, a meringue cake

== Other uses ==
- Kiev (brand), a Soviet-era brand of cameras
- Kiev (computer), a Soviet computer system of the mid-1950s
- Kiev class (disambiguation)
  - Kiev-class aircraft carrier, a class of Soviet aircraft carriers commissioned in 1975
    - Soviet aircraft carrier Kiev, the first ship of the class
  - Kiev-class destroyer, a class of unfinished Soviet destroyers of 1939–41
- Kiev (ship), a list of ships named Kiev
- Kiev Connolly, Irish songwriter, producer and musician
- Kyiv-1 Police Battalion
- Kyiv (trolleybus model), a Soviet and Ukrainian trolleybus model

== See also ==
- Battle of Kyiv (disambiguation)
- Chievo, a district of Verona, Italy
- Kief, cannabis crystals
- Kief, North Dakota, US
- Kieve (disambiguation)
- Kijev Do, Bosnia and Herzegovina
- Kijevo (disambiguation)
