= Battle of Kyiv =

Battle of Kyiv or Battle of Kiev may refer to:

- Siege of Kiev (898), by Álmos during the Hungarian migration to the west
- Siege of Kiev (968), by the Pechenigs against the Kievan Rus
- Siege of Kiev (1017), unsuccessful siege by the Pechenigs
- Capture of Kiev (1018) by Bolesław I the Brave
- Kiev uprising (1018), successful uprising against the Poles
- Siege of Kiev (1036), defeat of the Pechenegs by Yaroslav the Wise
- Sack of Kiev (1169), by a coalition assembled by Vladimir-Suzdal prince Andrey Bogolyubsky
- Siege of Kiev (1203), by Rurik Rostislavich
- Siege of Kiev (1240), during the Mongol invasion of Rus'
- Sack of Kiev (1299), during the war between Toqta against Nogay and the Polovtsy
- Sack of Kiev (1399), by Temür Qutlugh
- Sack of Kiev (1416), by Edigu against the Grand Duchy of Lithuania
- Sack of Kiev (1482), by Meñli I Giray against the Grand Duchy of Lithuania
- Capture of Kyiv (1651), by Janusz Radziwiłł
- Siege of Kyiv (1658), unsuccessful siege by Ivan Vyhovsky
- Kiev Arsenal January Uprising, January 1918
- Battle of Kiev (1918), a February Bolshevik military operation of Petrograd and the Moscow Red Guard against the Rada forces
- Battle of Kiev (January 1919), an offensive by elements of the Ukrainian Front of the Red Army to capture Kiev
- Capture of Kiev by the White Army, August 1919
- Battle of Kiev (December 1919), the third of three battles fought in Kiev in 1919
- Kiev offensive (1920), part of the Polish-Soviet War
- Battle of Kiev (1941), a major Axis victory over the Soviets during the Second World War
- Battle of Kiev (1943), a Soviet victory in the Second World War
  - National Museum-Preserve "Battle for Kyiv 1943", a museum dedicated to the 1943 battle
- Battle of Kyiv (2022), a Ukrainian victory over attacking Russian forces during the Kyiv offensive of 2022

== See also ==
- Kyiv offensive (disambiguation)
- Kiev Bolshevik Uprising, November 1917
- Polish Expedition to Kiev (disambiguation)
- Kyiv (disambiguation)
