= Kiev class =

Kiev class may refer to:

- Kiev-class aircraft carrier (Project 1143 Krechyet) Soviet battlecruiser fixed-wing aircraft carrier class
- Kiev-class destroyer (Project 48) Soviet destroyer leader class cancelled due to WWII

== See also ==
- Kiev (ship), ships named Kiev
- Kiev (disambiguation)
