= Kijevci =

Kijevci (etymologically connected to Kyiv) is a toponym that may refer to:

- Kijevci, Bosanska Gradiška, in Bosnia and Herzegovina
- Kijevci (Sjenica), in Serbia

== See also ==
- Kijevac (disambiguation)
- Kijevo (disambiguation)
