= Kieve =

Kieve can mean:

- Kieve, Müritz, a municipality in the Müritz district, in Mecklenburg-Vorpommern, Germany
- St Nectan's Kieve, a waterfall and pool near Tintagel, Cornwall

== See also ==
- Keeve (disambiguation)
- Kiev (disambiguation)
