= The Spoiled =

Italian post-punk band

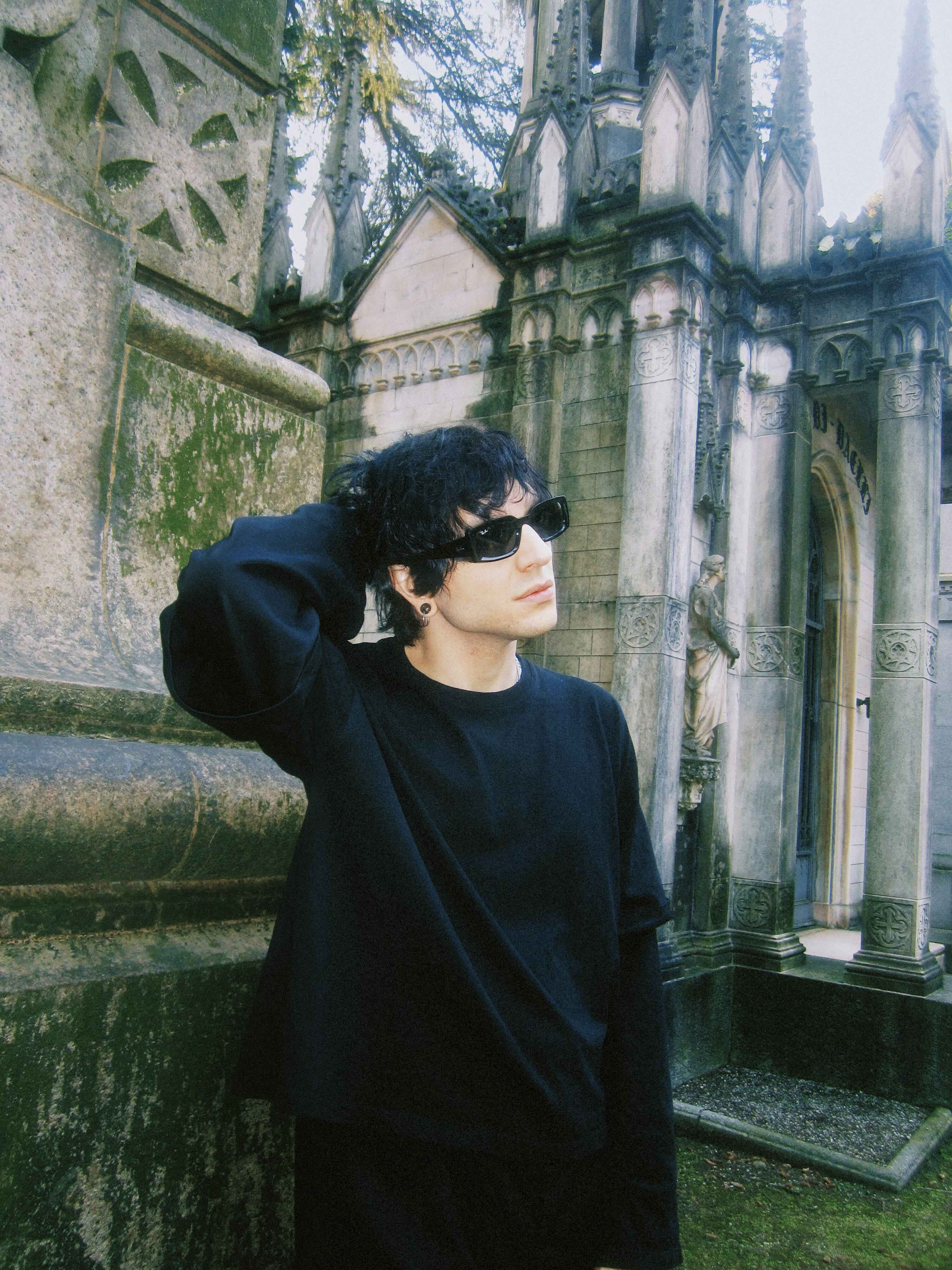

Background information
- Origin: Sammichele di Bari, Apulia, Italy
- Genres: post-punk; new wave; shoegaze; indie rock
- Years active: 2016, 2024-present
- Label: Avant! Records
- Members: Giovanni Santolla; Toto Ronzulli
- Website: http://thespoiledmusic.com/

The Spoiled is an Italian musical project founded by Giovanni Santolla in Sammichele di Bari in 2016. Keyboardist Toto Ronzulli joined the band in 2026. Their music combines post-punk, shoegaze, and indie rock.

== History ==
Initially started as a studio project, The Spoiled released its debut EP Ironshell on January 13, 2016 and a video for the single Wish House. Their full length Parasite came out on June 22, 2016 via Manic Depression Records.

After going on hiatus for 8 years, in late 2024, the project self-released the debut EP Time, followed in 2025 by the full-length Living Ghosts, anticipated by the singles The Day You Die and Ravenous.

Following the album’s release, The Spoiled collaborated with international acts including Darkways, Corlyx, Ash Code, This Eternal Decay, Chaos International, and Hinfort, while maintaining a dense touring schedule across Europe and sharing the stage with artists such as Traitrs, Hinfort, Darkways, and Ductape.

The new album When It Rains, has been released via Avant! Records on April 17, 2026.

After a year of booking their own shows, in spring 2026 The Spoiled joined the roster of Swamp Booking and embarked on a Northern European tour supporting Nuovo Testamento.

== Official members ==
- Giovanni Santolla - vocals, guitar, bass, bass vi, synth, programming, percussions (2016, 2024–present)
- Toto Ronzulli - synth, keyboards, programming (2026–present)

== Discography ==
=== Studio albums ===
- Parasite (Manic Depression Records, 2016)
- Living Ghosts (Swiss Dark Nights, 2025)
- When It Rains (Avant! Records, 2026)

=== EPs ===
- Ironshell (Manic Depression Records, 2016)
- Time (Manic Depression Records, 2024)

=== Singles ===
- Love Is Pain (self-released, 2024)
- The Day You Die (self-released, 2024)
- Ravenous (Swiss Dark Nights, 2025)
- When It Rains (Avant! Records, 2026)
- Sad Eyes, Angry Eyes (Avant! Records, 2026)
- Not My Cure (Avant! Records, 2026)
- white horses (self-released, 2026)

=== Videos ===
- "Wish House" (2016 - original version; 2024 - fixed version)
- "Hole In A Chest" (2024)
- "Ravenous (feat. Corlyx)" (2025)
- "Delusional (Porcelain Dancer Remix)" (2026)
- "When It Rains" (2026)
- "Sad Eyes, Angry Eyes" (2026)
- "Not My Cure" (2026)
