= Avant! Records =

Italian record label

- Founded: 2007
- Founder: Andrea Napoli
- Status: Active
- Genre: post-punk, dark wave, electronic music, synth-pop, industrial, new wave
- Country of origin: Italy
- Location: Bologna
- Official website: www.avantrecords.com

Avant! Records is an independent Italian record label based in Bologna, founded by Andrea Napoli. in late 2007, specializing in vinyl releases of dark wave, post-punk, cold wave, and experimental electronic music.

The label has released music from underground acts like Buzz Kull, Crush of Souls, Horror Vacui, House of Harm, King Dude, Lust for Youth, M!R!M, Night Sins, Nuovo Testamento, Qual, The Spoiled, and White Hex, showcasing a dark, melodic, and often melancholic sound.

== Discography ==
- AV!001 HIS ELECTRO BLUE VOICE / NUIT NOIRE – s/t (2007)
- AV!002 THE BLACK BUG – I Don't Like You (2008)
- AV!003 LOS LLAMARADA – Against The Day (2008)
- AV!004 MOVIE STAR JUNKIES – Junkyears (2009)
- AV!005 KRYSMOPOMPAS – Gesa (2009)
- AV!006 THE FEELING OF LOVE – Waiting For The Cheerleaders To Get Drunk (2009)
- AV!007 CCCANDY – Lonesome Berlin (2010)
- AV!008 CULT OF YOUTH – Filthy Plumage In An Open Sea! (2010)
- AV!009 SCORPION VIOLENTE – Uberschleiss (2010)
- AV!010 LUST FOR YOUTH – Solar Flare (2011)
- AV!011 CONTREPOISON – ...Until Next Morning (2011)
- AV!012 DREAM AFFAIR – Endless Days (2011)
- AV!013 King Dude – Tonight's Special Death (2011)
- AV!014 FATHER MURPHY / HOW MUCH WOOD WOULD A WOODCHUCK CHUCK IF A WOODCHUCK COULD CHUCK WOOD? – s/t (2011)
- AV!015 FUNK POLICE – Hot We Are Funk We Play (2011)
- AV!016 LFY / WAR – The Glass House Etiquette (2012)
- AV!017 LUST FOR YOUTH – Growing Seeds (2012)
- AV!018 WHITE HEX – Heat (2012)
- AV!019 NATURAL ASSEMBLY – Arms of Departure (2012)
- AV!020 NIGHT SINS – New Grave (2012)
- AV!021 HORROR VACUI – In Darkness You Will Feel Alright (2012)
- AV!022 HOW MUCH WOOD WOULD A WOODCHUCK CHUCK IF A WOODCHUCK COULD CHUCK WOOD? – s/t (2012)
- AV!023 LUST FOR YOUTH – Saluting Rome (2012)
- AV!024 LAKES – Blood of the Grove (2013)
- AV!025 KINIT HER – The Poet & The Blue Flower (2013)
- AV!026 NIGHT SINS – To London Or The Lake (2013)
- AV!027 SANGRE DE MUERDAGO / NOVEMTHREE – Braided Paths (2014)
- AV!028 CONTREPOISON – I Keep On Searching (2014)
- AV!029 NUN – Nun (2014)
- AV!030 PHASE FATALE – Skyscraper (2014)
- AV!031 HAND OF DUST – Walk in White (2014)
- AV!032 HOT GUTS – Wilds (2014)
- AV!033 LOST TRIBE – Solace (2014)
- AV!034 HORROR VACUI – Return of the Empire (2015)
- AV!035 Qual – Sable (2015)
- AV!036 BLACK BUG – Frozen Energy (2015)
- AV!037 PURE GROUND – Standard of Living (2015)
- AV!038 HAND OF DUST – Like Breath Beneath a Veil (2015)
- AV!039 DRIFT. – Black Devotion (2015)
- AV!040 KOBAN – Abject Obsessions (2016)
- AV!041 RENDEZ-VOUS – Distance (2016)
- AV!042 YOU. – Bouquet (2016)
- AV!043 PURE GROUND – Giftgarten (2016)
- AV!044 PLEASURE SYMBOLS – Pleasure Symbols (2016)
- AV!045 THE AGNES CIRCLE – Some Vague Desire (2016)
- AV!046 Qual – Cupio Dissolvi (2017)
- AV!047 VEIL OF LIGHT – Front Teeth (2017)
- AV!048 DRIFT. – Genderland (2017)
- AV!049 DRIFT. – Genderland (2017)
- AV!050 SALLY DIGE – Holding On (2017)
- AV!051 Qual – The Ultimate Climax (2018)
- AV!052 HOLIDAY INN – Torbido (2018)
- AV!053 FATHER MURPHY – Rising. A requiem for Father Murphy (2018)
- AV!054 SDH – Tell Them (2018)
- AV!055 DEATH BELLS – Standing At The Edge Of The World (2018)
- AV!056 SDH – Semiotics Department Of Heteronyms (2018)
- AV!057 RITUAL VEIL – Wolf In The Night (2018)
- AV!058 HØRD – Parallels (2018)
- AV!059 Buzz Kull – New Kind Of Cross (2018)
- AV!060 Qual – Cyber Care (2019)
- AV!061 PROFIT PRISON – Six Strange Passions (2019)
- AV!062 VEIL OF LIGHT – Inflict (2019)
- AV!063 PLEASURE SYMBOLS – Closer And Closer Apart (2019)
- AV!064 SKEMER – Benevolence (2019)
- AV!065 Nuovo Testamento – Exposure (2019)
- AV!066 Buzz Kull – Last In The Club (2019)
- AV!067 M!R!M – The Visionary (2020)
- AV!068 SDH – Against Strong Thinking (2020)
- AV!069 HØRD – Bodies (2020)
- AV!070 PLASTIC ESTATE – This Place (2020)
- AV!071 House of Harm – Vicious Pastimes (2020)
- AV!072 PROFIT PRISON – Dreams of a Dark Building (2020)
- AV!073 VEIL OF LIGHT – Landslide (2021)
- AV!074 Nuovo Testamento – New Earth (2021)
- AV!075 PLASTIC ESTATE – Plastic Estate (2022)
- AV!076 M!R!M – Time Traitor (2022)
- AV!077 SDH – Maybe A Body (2022)
- AV!078 BLIND SEAGULL – Personal Decay (2022)
- AV!079 HØRD – Sciences (2022)
- AV!080 Buzz Kull – Fascination (2022)
- AV!081 VEIL OF LIGHT – Sundancing (2023)
- AV!082 KORINE – Tear (2023)
- AV!083 MALE TEARS – KRYPT (2023)
- AV!084 SDH – Fake Is Real (2023)
- AV!085 Crush of Souls – (A)Void Love (2023)
- AV!086 DELUXXE – If You Were Me (2023)
- AV!087 SKEMER – Toasts & Sentiments (2023)
- AV!088 House of Harm – Playground (2023)
- AV!089 DANCING PLAGUE – Elogium (2024)
- AV!090 POISON POINT – Wandering Echoes (2024)
- AV!091 BLIND SEAGULL – Decade Of Effort (2024)
- AV!092 PROFIT PRISON – Gilt (2024)
- AV!093 MALE TEARS – Paradísco (2024)
- AV!094 PLASTIC ESTATE – Code d’Amour (2024)
- AV!095 NO FILTER – Sans Filtre (2024)
- AV!096 Crush of Souls – Lézire (2025)
- AV!097 SPLEEN – Demos (2025)
- AV!098 SILVER TEARS – Silver Tears (2025)
- AV!099 Buzz Kull – Chroma (2025)
- AV!100 The Spoiled – When It Rains (2026)
- AV!101 BRÅND – Tåg & Nåcht (2026)
- AV!102 Crush of Souls – Captive Youth (2026)
- AV!103 BALVANERA - Hasta tocar el fondo vacío del lenguaje (2026)
