= Boris Vyacheslavich =

Prince of Chernigov in 1077

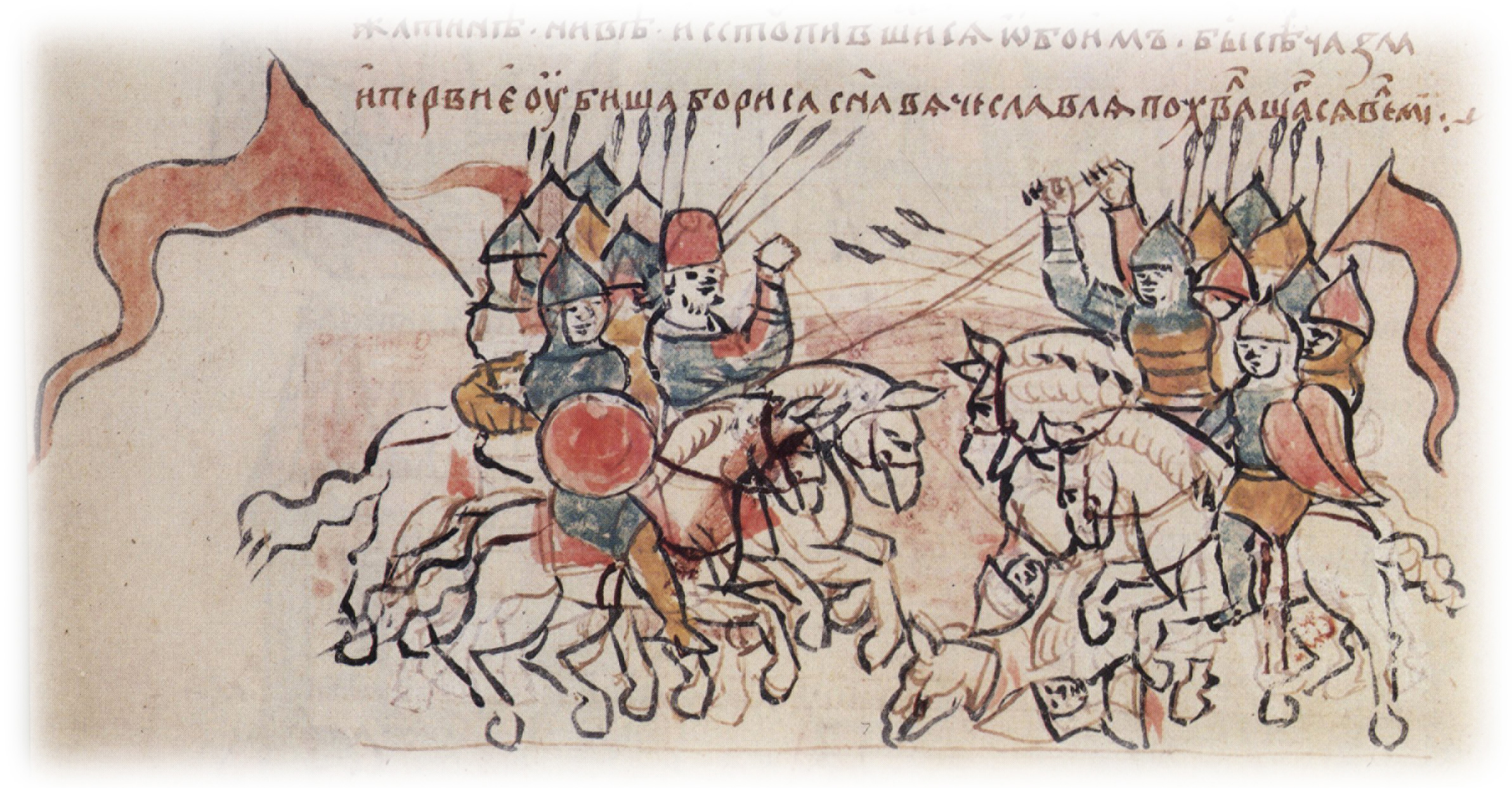
- Death of Boris as depicted in the Radziwiłł Chronicle, 15th century

Prince of Chernigov
- Reign: 1077
- Predecessor: Vsevolod Yaroslavich
- Successor: Vsevolod Yaroslavich
- Died: 3 October 1078; Nezhatina Field
- Dynasty: Rurik
- Father: Vyacheslav Yaroslavich

Boris Vyacheslavich (Note: Russian: Борис Вячеславич; Ukrainian: Борис В'ячеславич) (died 1078) was Prince of Chernigov for eight days in 1077. He was the son of Vyacheslav Yaroslavich, Prince of Smolensk. Following his father's death in 1057, the child Boris was debarred from his inheritance. He died fighting against his uncles—Vsevolod Yaroslavich, Prince of Chernigov and Izyaslav Yaroslavich, Grand Prince of Kiev—on 3 October 1078.

== Early life ==
Boris was the son of Vyacheslav Yaroslavich, Prince of Smolensk, a younger son of Yaroslav the Wise, Grand Prince of Kiev. According to the historian Martin Dimnik, Boris was a child when his father died in 1057. Boris became an izgoi—a member of the Rurik dynasty debarred from ruling—after his father's death, because his uncle, Igor Yaroslavich succeeded his father in Smolensk. Boris's allegedly close relationship with his cousins, Oleg Svyatoslavich and Roman Svyatoslavich implies that their father, Sviatoslav Iaroslavich, Prince of Chernigov appeased Boris "in some manner, undoubtedly, by giving him a town", according to Martin.

== In Chernigov ==
Principalities in the Kievan Rus' (1054-1132)

Upon the death of Sviatoslav Yaroslavich in 1077, his brothers Vsevolod Yaroslavich and Izyaslav Yaroslavich started a bitter rivalry over the Kievan throne. Vsevolod left Chernigov and headed towards Izyaslav, who had set out on a military campaign against Kiev. Boris took advantage of his uncle's absence and seized control of Chernigov. He only managed to remain in power for eight days and then had to flee to Tmutarakan upon hearing the news of Vsevolod's return.

== In Tmutarakan ==
In Tmutarakan, Boris was accepted by his cousin, Prince Roman Svyatoslavich. The two were soon joined by Roman's brother, Oleg, who had been banished by his uncles from the Principality of Vladimir. Boris and Oleg allied themselves with the Cumans and attacked Vsevolod on the Sozh River, defeating his army in a bloody battle and capturing Chernigov on 25 August 1078. Soon, Vsevolod and Izyaslav were able to muster a new army with the help of their sons and headed for Chernigov.

Boris and Oleg had already left the city by the time Vsevolod and Izyaslav approached it, but the citizens of Chernigov closed the gates and prepared for the siege. The attackers burned the outer parts of the city and wanted to proceed further, but received the news on Oleg and Boris coming to Chernigov's rescue. Oleg tried to convince his cousin Boris not to seek direct confrontation with the four princes, but Boris decided to take them on. Boris died in a fierce battle "at a place near a village on the meadow of Nezhata" on 3 October, according to the Primary Chronicle.

== Sources ==
- Dimnik, Martin (1994). The Dynasty of Chernigov, 1054–1146. Pontifical Institute of Mediaeval Studies. ISBN 0-88844-116-9.
- Franklin, Simon; Shepard, Jonathan (1996). The Emergence of Rus 750–1200. Longman. ISBN 0-582-49091X.
- The Russian Primary Chronicle: Laurentian Text (Translated and edited by Samuel Hazzard Cross and Olgerd P. Sherbowitz-Wetzor) (1953). Medieval Academy of America. ISBN 978-0-915651-32-0.
