= Kiev (ship) =

Kiev is the name of several ships:

== Warships ==
- Russian monitor Kiev, a Novgorod-class river monitor coastal defense ship, later renamed Vice Admiral Popov, which served in the Russo-Turkish War.
- Soviet destroyer leader Kiev, a Project 38 Leningrad-class destroyer leader that was renamed to Ordzhonikidze, Sergo Ordzhonikidze, and then finally, Baku; which served in World War II.
- Soviet destroyer Kiev, a Project 48 Kiev-class destroyer that was cancelled due to World War II after being launched
- Soviet helicopter carrier Kiev, a Project 1123M Moskva-class helicopter carrier that was cancelled in 1969
- Soviet aircraft carrier Kiev, a Project 1143 Kiev-class aircraft carrier that was laid down in 1970, launched in 1972, and commissioned in 1975

== Civilian ships ==
- Kiev (icebreaker) (IMO number: 6424040), a Moskva-class icebreaker of the Soviet Union; see list of icebreakers
- Kiev (passenger ship) (MMSI number: 273337580), a passenger ship of Russia
- Kiev (fishing vessel) (IMO number: 8859885), a fishing vessel of Russia
- Kiev (tug) (IMO number: 9377274), a tug of Vietnam

== See also ==
- Kiev class (disambiguation)
- Kiev (disambiguation)
