= Kyiv offensive =

Kyiv offensive or Kiev offensive may refer to:

- Kiev offensive (1920), a campaign during the Polish–Soviet war
- Kyiv offensive (2022), part of the Northern front of the Russian invasion of Ukraine

== See also ==
- Battle of Kyiv (disambiguation)
