= Polish Expedition to Kiev =

Polish Expedition to Kiev (Polish: Wyprawa kijowska) may refer to one of the following events:

- Boleslaw I's intervention in the Kievan succession crisis, 1018, a Polish intervention into who would be ruler of Kiev and the state of Kievan Rus'
- Kiev offensive (1920), an attempt by Poland, led by Józef Piłsudski, to seize central and eastern Ukraine from Soviet control

== See also ==
- Battle of Kyiv (disambiguation)
