= Parasite (The Spoiled album) =

2016 studio album by Italian post-punk band The Spoiled

Studio album by The Spoiled
- Released: June 22, 2016
- Genre: Post-punk; industrial; noise
- Length: 49:52
- Label: Manic Depression
- Producer: Giovanni Santolla

The Spoiled chronology
Ironshell (2016)	Parasite (2016)	Time (2024)

Singles from Parasite
- 1. "Wish House" Released: February 10, 2016

Parasite is the debut studio album by the Italian post-punk band The Spoiled, released on June 22, 2016, via Manic Depression Records.

Written and produced by Giovanni Santolla, the album features the tracks "Wish House" and "Empty Stations", which were previously included on the band's debut EP Ironshell.

The album incorporates samples from the 2002 film The Mothman Prophecies.

== Track listing ==
All tracks are written by Giovanni Santolla.

Parasite track listing
No.	Title	Length
1.	"Eve"	1:02
2.	"Closure"	3:14
3.	"Wish House"	4:10
4.	"Empty Stations"	3:48
5.	"Bound in Heaven"	2:10
6.	"Romantic Nightmare"	4:00
7.	"When Sheep Stop Dreaming"	3:14
8.	"Until We Fall Apart"	6:48
9.	"I Am Void"	4:54
10.	"Parasite"	2:40
11.	"Samael"	2:40
12.	"Moth"	6:20
13.	"Empty Stations (Remix)"	4:52
Total length:		49:52

== Personnel ==
The Spoiled

- Giovanni Santolla – vocals, bass, synthesizer, programming, percussions, mixing, mastering
