= Igor Yaroslavich =

- Prince of Smolensk
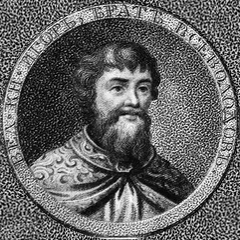
- Portrait of Igor from the book William Tooke
- Reign: 1057–1060
- Born: c. 1036
- Died: 1060 (aged 23–24); Smolensk
- Burial: Transfiguration Cathedral (Chernihiv)
- Spouse: Konigunda, countess of Orlamünde
- Issue: Davyd Igorevich; Vsevolod Igorevich
- House: Rurik
- Father: Yaroslav Vladimirovich
- Mother: Ingererd Olofsdotter

Igor Yaroslavich was one of the younger sons of Yaroslav the Wise from the Rurikid dynasty of Kievan Rus’. He was baptized as George.

The date of his birth is unsure. Some historians consider him to be born in 1034–35, while others think that he was born after Yaroslav moved to Kiev in 1036. Upon the death of his father Iziaslav I of Kiev who was the eldest at that time appointed him as the Prince of Volyn. When another of his brother Vyacheslav has died under unknown circumstances, Igor was transferred to Smolensk. Around that time Rostislav of Tmutarakan was given his former realm to govern.

Like his other brother Vyacheslav, Igor died young when he was only 24, leaving behind two children Davyd and Vsevolod. Igor was married to a countess of Orlamünde; the wedding with whom was conducting while Yaroslav the Wise was still alive.

== Children ==
- Davyd Igorevich, the Prince of Volyn (1086–1099). Davyd was constantly at war with the neighboring Vasylko from Terebovl.
- Vsevolod Igorevich

== Ancestry ==
Ancestors of Igor Yaroslavich

8. Sviatoslav I of Kiev
4. Vladimir the Great
9. Malusha
2. Yaroslav the Wise
5. Rogneda of Polotsk or Anna Porphyrogenita
1. Igor Yaroslavich
12. Erik Segersäll
6. Olof Skötkonung
13. Sigríð Storråda or Świętosława
3. Ingegerd Olofsdotter of Sweden
7. Estrid of the Obotrites

Preceded by	Prince of Volyn; 1054–1057	Succeeded by Rostislav of Tmutarakan
