= House of Harm =

American post-punk band

- Origin: Boston, United States
- Genres: post-punk; synth pop
- Years active: 2017-present
- Label: Avant! Records
- Members: Michael Rocheford; Cooper Leardi; Tyler Kershaw

House of Harm is a Boston-based post-punk/synth-pop trio formed in 2017 by Michael Rocheford, Cooper Leardi, and Tyler Kershaw.

== History ==
The band started as a studio project in 2017 before playing their first show opening for The Cure’s Reeves Gabrels.

Known for a "shadow pop" sound blending 80s darkwave with melancholic, emotional melodies, they have gained an international following via the EP Coming of Age (2018) and the albums Vicious Pastimes (2020) and Playground (2023).

== Official members ==
- Michael Rocheford - lead vocals (2017–present)
- Cooper Leardi - guitars, synths (2017–present)
- Tyler Kershaw - bass (2019–present)

== Discography ==
=== Studio albums ===
- Vicious Pastimes (Avant! Records, 2020)
- Playground (Avant! Records, 2023)

=== Live albums ===
- House of Harm on Audiotree Live (Audiotree Music, 2025)
- The Concept of Harm: Live in Berlin (Maison du Mal, 2026)

=== EPs ===
- Coming of Age (Spider Child/Altar Piece, 2018)

=== Singles ===
- Isolator (self-released, 2017)
- Catch (self-released, 2019)
- Vicious Pastimes (Avant! Records, 2020)
- Behind You (Avant! Records, 2020)
- Always (Avant! Records, 2020)
- Feel My Heart Beat / In Trees (self-released, 2022)
- Taste the Light (Radio 100, 2023)
- Madhouse (Maison du Mal, 2023)
- Roseglass (Avant! Records, 2023)
- Two Kinds (Avant! Records, 2023)
- Can't Find The Feeling (Maison du Mal, 2025)
- Carousel (Maison du Mal, 2025)
- Away Above (Maison du Mal, 2025)

=== Videos ===
- "Catch" (2019)
- "Vicious Pastimes" (2020)
- "Always" (2020)
- "Waste of Time" (2021)
- "Feel My Heart Beat" (2022)
- "Taste the Light" (2023)
- "Madhouse" (2023)
- "Roseglass" (2023)
- "Two Kinds" (2023)
- "Soaked in Pastel" (2024)
- "Carousel" (2025)
