= Ironshell =

Ironshell EP

EP by the Spoiled
- Released: 13 January 2016
- Genre: post-punk, industrial
- Length: 23:15
- Label: Manic Depression

The Spoiled chronology
Ironshell EP (2016)	Parasite (2016)

Ironshell is the debut EP by the Italian post-punk band the Spoiled, released on January 13, 2016, via Manic Depression Records.

Written and produced by Giovanni Santolla, the EP features a reworked version of Warszawa, originally composed by David Bowie and Brian Eno.

== Track listing ==
All tracks are written by Giovanni Santolla except where noted.

Ironshell track listing
No.	Title	Length
1.	"Die Hand Die Verletzt"	4:16
2.	"Empty Stations"	3:54
3.	"Wish House"	4:12
4.	"Bloodleaves"	6:36
5.	"Warszawa" (David Bowie, Brian Eno)	4:17
Total length:		23:15

== Personnel ==
The Spoiled

- Giovanni Santolla – vocals, bass, synthesizer, programming, percussions, mixing, mastering
