= Buzz Kull =

Australian dark-wave solo project

- Origin: Sydney, Australia
- Genres: EBM; synth pop; dark wave
- Years active: 2012-present
- Labels: Avant! Records, Heartworm Press
- Members: Marc Dwyer
- Website: buzzkull.net

Buzz Kull is a solo project by Australian musician Marc Dwyer.

== History ==
Dwyer has released three albums under the Buzz Kull moniker, 2017's Chroma and 2018's New Kind of Cross, 2022's Fascination. He has collaborated with the likes of Liars, Ellen Allien and Kontravoid.

== Official members ==
- Marc Dwyer - synth, programming, percussions (2012–present)

== Discography ==
=== Studio albums ===
- Chroma (Avant! Records, 2017)
- New Kind Of Cross (Avant! Records, 2018)
- Fascination (Avant! Records, 2022)

=== EPs ===
- Fallen Flower (self-released, 2012)
- Heat (self-released, 2013)
- Good Spell (Max Berry Audio Accompaniment (self-released, 2022)
- Deep Hate (Hearthworm Press, 2026)

=== Singles ===
- I Disappear (Fabrika Records, 2013)
- Dreams (Fabrika Records, 2014)
- Nausea (Avant! Records, 2017)
- Avoiding The Light (Avant! Records, 2018)
- Last In The Club (Avant! Records, 2019),
- Rise From Yur Grave (Avant! Records, 2022)
- Dancing With Machines (Avant! Records, 2022)
- Fascination (Avant! Records, 2022)
- A Place That's Meant To Be (Eskimo Recordings, 2023)
- Somebody's Watching Me (Cleopatra Records, 2024)
- If We Make It Through December (Cleopatra Records, 2024)
- Truly Madly Deeply (Cleopatra Records, 2024)
- Darkness (Cleopatra Records, 2025)
- Just A Memory (Hearthworm Press, 2025)

=== Videos ===
- "Fallen Flower" (2012)
- "Visions & Lights" (2013)
- "Avoiding The Light" (2018)
- "Rise From Your Grave" (2022)
- "Dancing With Machines" (2022)
- "Fascination" (2023)
- "Into The Void" (2025)
- "Just A Memory" (2025)
- "Black Gate" (2026)
