= Kijevo =

Kijevo (Serbian Cyrillic: Кијево) is a Croatian and Serbian toponym that may refer to:

- Kijevo, Croatia, a village and a municipality in Šibenik-Knin County
- Kijevo, Sanski Most, a village in the municipality of Sanski Most, Federation of Bosnia and Herzegovina, Bosnia and Herzegovina
- Kijevo, Trnovo, a village in the municipality of Trnovo, city of East Sarajevo, Republika Srpska, Bosnia and Herzegovina
- Kijevo, Batočina, a village in the municipality of Batočina, Šumadija District, Serbia
- Kijevo, Belgrade, a suburb of Belgrade, Serbia
- Kijevë, Malisheva, a village in the municipality of Malisheva, Kosovo

== See also ==
- Kijevci (disambiguation)
- Kiev (disambiguation)
