= When It Rains (album) =

Studio album by the Spoiled
- Released: April 17, 2026
- Genre: Post-punk; new wave; shoegaze; alternative rock; indie rock
- Length: 37:13
- Label: Avant!
- Producer: Giovanni Santolla

The Spoiled chronology
Living Ghosts (2025)	When It Rains (2026)

Singles from When It Rains
- 1. "When It Rains" Released: February 6, 2026; 2. "Sad Eyes, Angry Eyes" Released: March 6, 2026; 3. "Not My Cure" Released: April 3, 2026

When It Rains is the third studio album by the Italian post-punk band the Spoiled, released on April 17, 2026, through Avant! Records.

Written and produced by Giovanni Santolla, the album has been preceded by three singles: the lead single When It Rains, followed by Sad Eyes, Angry Eyes and Not My Cure.

The album marks a shift from the band’s earlier dark wave style toward a more post-punk sound infused with elements of electrogaze, new wave and indie rock.

== Track listing ==
All tracks are written by Giovanni Santolla.

When It Rains track listing
No.	Title	Length
1.	"L'addio"	1:21
2.	"When It Rains"	2:46
3.	"Sad Eyes, Angry Eyes"	3:01
4.	"Not My Cure"	2:54
5.	"Fall In Love With a Ghost"	2:56
6.	"Two Souls Apart"	3:06
7.	"The Night You Burn"	3:08
8.	"Crush"	2:32
9.	"Say Goodbye"	3:11
10.	"The Fault Was You"	4:26
11.	"Just A Dream Away"	1:30
12.	"Dead Wasted Girl"	2:25
13.	"Watch Me Bleed"	3:57
Total length:		37:13

== Personnel ==
The Spoiled

- Giovanni Santolla – vocals, guitar, bass, synthesizer, programming, percussions

Technical

- Angelo Abbruzzese – mixing
- Maurizio Baggio – mastering (at La Distilleria Studio, Vicenza, Italy)
