= Time (The Spoiled EP) =

2024 EP by Italian post-punk band The Spoiled

Time EP

EP by the Spoiled
- Released: 4 October 2024
- Genre: Post-punk
- Length: 18:54
- Label: Manic Depression

The Spoiled chronology
Parasite (2016)	Time EP (2024)	Living Ghosts (2025)

Time is the second EP by the Italian post-punk band the Spoiled, self-released on October 4, 2024, and distributed by Manic Depression Records.

Written and produced by Giovanni Santolla, the EP was preceded by the singles "Love Is Pain" and a cover of "I Don't Wanna Be Me", originally performed by Type O Negative.

== Track listing ==
All tracks are written by Giovanni Santolla except where noted.

Time track listing
No.	Title	Length
1.	"Time"	3:16
2.	"Hole in a Chest"	3:09
3.	"I Don't Wanna Be Me" (Peter Steele)	3:14
4.	"Dancing on My Grave"	2:16
5.	"Love Is Pain"	3:21
6.	"Where the Fireflies Say Goodnight"	3:38
Total length:		18:54

2025 Deluxe Edition
No.	Title	Length
1.	"Time"	3:16
2.	"Love Is Pain"	3:21
3.	"I Don't Wanna Be Me" (Peter Steele)	3:14
4.	"Dancing on My Grave"	2:16
5.	"Hole in a Chest"	3:09
6.	"Where the Fireflies Say Goodnight"	3:38
7.	"Time" (slowed)	3:39
8.	"Love Is Pain" (slowed)	3:46
9.	"Love Is Pain" (Synthetic Mushdrum remix)	3:58
Total length:		30:17

== Personnel ==
The Spoiled

- Giovanni Santolla – vocals, guitar, bass, synthesizer, programming, percussions, mixing, mastering
