= Living Ghosts =

Studio album by The Spoiled
- Released: April 4, 2025
- Genre: Post-punk
- Length: 35:35
- Label: Swiss Dark Nights
- Producer: Giovanni Santolla

The Spoiled chronology
Time (2024)	Living Ghosts (2025)	When It Rains (2026)

Singles from Living Ghosts
- 1. "The Day You Die" Released: November 29, 2024; 2. "Ravenous" Released: February 28, 2025

Living Ghosts is the second studio album by the Italian post-punk band The Spoiled, released on April 4, 2025, through Swiss Dark Nights.

Written and produced by Giovanni Santolla, the album was preceded by the singles "The Day You Die" and "Ravenous".

== Track listing ==
All tracks are written by Giovanni Santolla.

Living Ghosts track listing
No.	Title	Length
1.	"Addicted to Lies"	3:04
2.	"Ravenous"	3:24
3.	"The Emptiness Inside"	3:28
4.	"The Day You Die"	3:12
5.	"Obsession Thorn"	3:09
6.	"Delusional"	3:58
7.	"Living Ghost"	3:26
8.	"Burn the Witch"	3:18
9.	"Violence"	3:44
10.	"Last Embrace"	4:52
Total length:		35:35

== Personnel ==
The Spoiled

- Giovanni Santolla – vocals, guitar, bass, synthesizer, programming, percussions, mixing, mastering
