= Keeve =

Keeve and keeving are terms used in:

- Cider making
- Ore dressing
- Kier (industrial), or keeve, kier, or kieve, a large boiler or vat used in bleaching cotton

== See also ==
- Kyiv
