= Yaroslav the Wise =

Grand Prince of Kiev from 1019 to 1054

Yaroslav I the Wise
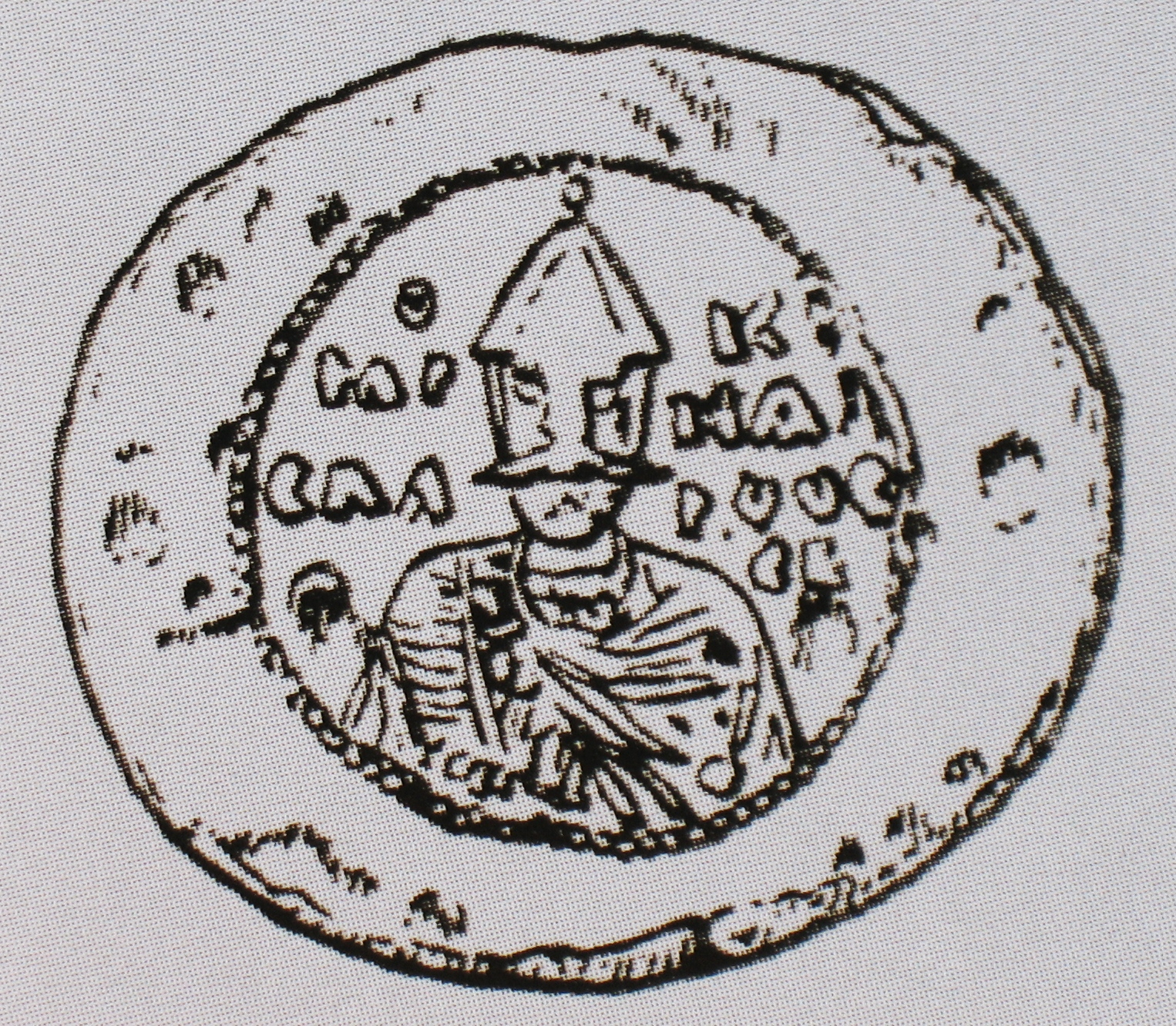
- The only contemporary image of Yaroslav I the Wise, on his seal

Grand Prince of Kiev
- Reign: 1019–1054
- Predecessor: Sviatopolk the Accursed
- Successor: Iziaslav I

Prince of Novgorod
- Reign: 1010–1034

Prince of Rostov (?)
- Reign: 978–1010
- Born: c. 978
- Died: 20 February 1054 (aged 76); Vyshgorod
- Burial: Saint Sophia's Cathedral, Kiev
- Spouse: Ingegerd Olofsdotter of Sweden
- Issue Details...: Elisiv, Queen of Norway; Anastasia, Queen of Hungary; Anne, Queen of the Franks; Agatha (possibly); Ilya Yaroslavich; Vladimir of Novgorod; Iziaslav I; Sviatoslav II; Vsevolod I; Igor Yaroslavich; Vyacheslav Yaroslavich
Names
- Yaroslav Vladimirovich; Grand Prince Iaroslav Mudryi; Yaroslav I
- Dynasty: Rurik
- Father: Vladimir the Great
- Mother: Rogneda of Polotsk or Anna Porphyrogenita
- Religion: Chalcedonian Christianity
- Insignia

Yaroslav I Vladimirovich (Note: Sometimes spelled Iaroslav; Old East Slavic: Ꙗрославъ Володимѣровичъ, romanized: Jaroslavŭ Volodiměrovičŭ; Russian: Ярослав Владимирович; Ukrainian: Ярослав Володимирович, romanized: Yaroslav Volodymyrovych; Old Norse: Jarizleifr Valdamarsson) (c. 978 – 20 February 1054), better known as Yaroslav the Wise, (Note: Russian: Ярослав Мудрый, IPA: [jɪrɐˈslaf ˈmudrɨj]; Ukrainian: Ярослав Мудрий, romanized: Yaroslav Mudryi. "Mudryi" ("the Wise") is a nickname made up by 19th-century nationalist historians; it does not appear in medieval sources.) was Grand Prince of Kiev from 1019 until his death in 1054. He was also earlier Prince of Novgorod from 1010 to 1034 and Prince of Rostov from 987 to 1010, uniting the principalities for a time. Yaroslav's baptismal name was George (Note: Old East Slavic: Гюрьгi, romanized: Gjurĭgì) after Saint George.

Yaroslav was a son of Vladimir the Great and Rogneda of Polotsk. Yaroslav ruled the northern lands around Rostov before being transferred to Novgorod in 1010. He had a strained relationship with his father and refused to pay tribute to Kiev in 1014. Following Vladimir's death in 1015, Yaroslav waged a complicated war for the Kievan throne against his half-brother Sviatopolk, ultimately emerging victorious in 1019.

As the Grand Prince of Kiev, Yaroslav focused on foreign policy, forming alliances with Scandinavian countries and weakening Byzantine influence on Kiev. He successfully captured the area around present-day Tartu, Estonia, establishing the fort of Yuryev, and forced nearby regions to pay tribute. Yaroslav also defended his state against nomadic tribes such as the Pechenegs by constructing a line of forts. He was a patron of literary culture, sponsoring the construction of Saint Sophia Cathedral in 1037 and promoting the first work of Old East Slavic literature by Hilarion of Kiev.

Yaroslav married Ingegerd Olofsdotter in 1019. Several of their daughters married into foreign royal families, while their sons went on to rule various parts of Kievan Rus'. Yaroslav was known for promoting unity among his children and emphasizing the importance of living in peace. After his death, his body was placed in a sarcophagus within Saint Sophia's Cathedral, but his remains were later lost or stolen. Yaroslav's legacy includes founding several towns and having numerous monuments and institutions named after him.

== Rise to the throne ==
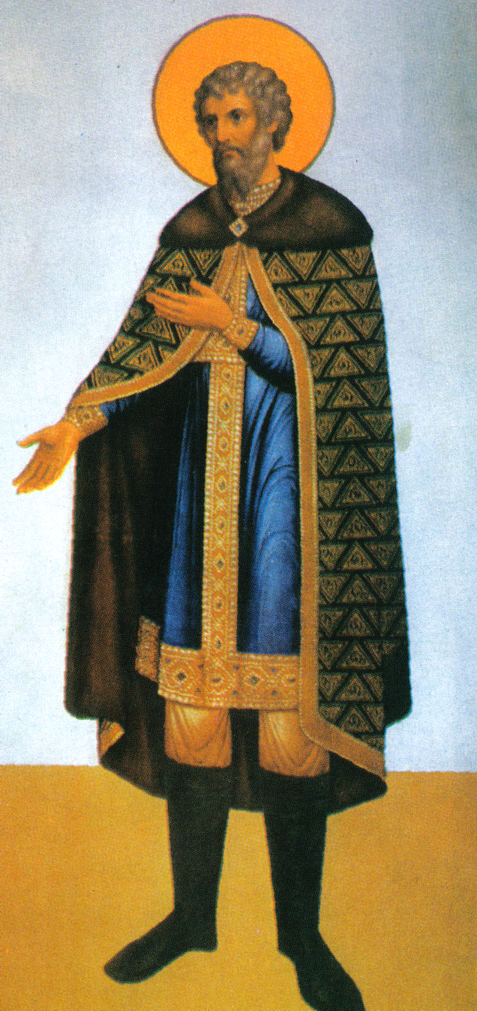
A depiction of Yaroslav the Wise from Granovitaya Palata

The early years of Yaroslav's life are mostly unknown. He was one of the numerous sons of Vladimir the Great, presumably his second by Rogneda of Polotsk, although his actual age (as stated in the Primary Chronicle and corroborated by the examination of his skeleton in the 1930s) would place him among the youngest children of Vladimir.

It has been suggested that he was a child begotten out of wedlock after Vladimir's divorce from Rogneda and marriage to Anna Porphyrogenita, or even that he was a child of Anna Porphyrogenita herself. French historian Jean-Pierre Arrignon argues that he was indeed Anna's son, as this would explain his interference in Byzantine affairs in 1043. William Humphreys also favors a reconstruction making Yaroslav the son, rather than the step-son, of Anna, by invoking onomastic arguments. It is curious that Yaroslav named his elder son Vladimir (after his own father) and one of his daughters Anna (as if after his own mother). There is a certain pattern in his sons having Slavic names, and his daughters having Greek names only. Furthermore, Yaroslav's maternity by Rogneda of Polotsk had been questioned by Mykola Kostomarov in the 19th century.

Yaroslav figures prominently in the Norse sagas under the name Jarisleif the Lame; his legendary lameness (probably resulting from an arrow wound) was corroborated by the scientists who examined his remains.

In his youth, Yaroslav was sent by his father to rule the northern lands around Rostov. In 1010 he was transferred to Veliky Novgorod, after the death of his brother, Vysheslav Vladimirovich, who rules in Novgorod. While living there, he founded the town of Yaroslavl (literally, "Yaroslav's") on the Volga River. His relations with his father were apparently strained, and grew only worse on the news that Vladimir bequeathed the Kievan throne to his younger son, Boris. Yaroslav refused to pay tribute to Kiev in 1014 and brought over Varangians from overseas, with only Vladimir's illness and subsequent death in July 1015 preventing a war.

During the next four years Yaroslav waged a complicated and bloody war for Kiev against his half-brother Sviatopolk I of Kiev, who was supported by his father-in-law, Duke Bolesław I the Brave (King of Poland from 1025). During the course of this struggle, several other brothers (Boris, Gleb, and Svyatoslav) were brutally murdered. The Primary Chronicle accused Sviatopolk of planning those murders. The saga Eymundar þáttr hrings is often interpreted as recounting the story of Boris' assassination by the Varangians in the service of Yaroslav.

However, the victim's name is given there as Burizaf, which is also a name of Boleslaus I in the Scandinavian sources. It is thus possible that the Saga tells the story of Yaroslav's struggle against Sviatopolk (whose troops were commanded by the Polish duke), and not against Boris.

Yaroslav defeated Sviatopolk in their first battle, in 1016, and Sviatopolk fled to Poland. Sviatopolk returned in 1018 with Polish troops furnished by his father-in-law, seized Kiev, and pushed Yaroslav back into Novgorod. Yaroslav prevailed over Sviatopolk, and in 1019 firmly established his rule over Kiev. One of his first actions as a grand prince was to confer on the loyal Novgorodians, who had helped him to gain the Kievan throne, numerous freedoms and privileges.

Thus, the foundation of the Novgorod Republic was laid. For their part, the Novgorodians respected Yaroslav more than they did other Kievan princes; and the princely residence in their city, next to the marketplace (and where the veche often convened) was named Yaroslav's Court after him. It probably was during this period that Yaroslav promulgated the first code of laws in the lands of the East Slavs, the Russkaya Pravda.

== Reign ==
=== Power struggles between siblings ===
Leaving aside the legitimacy of Yaroslav's claims to the Kievan throne and his postulated guilt in the murder of his brothers, Nestor the Chronicler and later Russian historians often presented him as a model of virtue, styling him "the Wise". A less appealing side of his personality is revealed by his having imprisoned his youngest brother Sudislav for life. In response, another brother, Mstislav of Chernigov, whose distant realm bordered the North Caucasus and the Black Sea, hastened to Kiev.

Despite reinforcements led by Yaroslav's brother-in-law King Anund Jacob of Sweden (as Yakun—"blind and dressed in a gold suit" or "handsome and dressed in a gold suit") Mstislav inflicted a heavy defeat on Yaroslav in 1024. Yaroslav and Mstislav then divided Kievan Rus' between them: the area stretched east from the Dnieper River, with the capital at Chernigov, was ceded to Mstislav until his death in 1036.

=== Allies along the Baltic coast ===
In his foreign policy, Yaroslav relied on a Scandinavian alliance and attempted to weaken the Byzantine influence on Kiev. According to Heimskringla, Olof Skötkonung made an alliance with Yaroslav, even though the alliance was not liked in Sweden, in order to declare war against Olaf II of Norway. This was sealed in 1019 when King Olof married his daughter to Yaroslav instead of the Norwegian king. Supposedly this led to protestations from the nobles in Sweden because they wanted to reestablish control over their lost eastern territories and bring in tribute from Kievan Rus', as his father Eric the Victorious had done. The Heimskringla states that after years of war against Norway, Sweden no longer had the power to collect regular tributes from Kievan Rus'. According to Snorri, in 1022 Olaf was forced to share power with his then 10–12 year old son Anund Jakob. The veracity of Snorri's account of Olof Skötkonung's reign, written more than two centuries later, is difficult to assess. Snorri also writes in his account that Olof helped defend the Eastern countries from "invaders", ensuring Swedish military interests.

In a successful military raid in 1030, Yaroslav captured Tartu, Estonia, and renamed it Yuryev (named after Yury, Yaroslav's patron saint) and forced the surrounding Ugandi County to pay annual tribute.

In 1031, he conquered Cherven cities from the Poles followed by the construction of Sutiejsk to guard the newly acquired lands. In c. 1034 Yaroslav concluded an alliance with Polish King Casimir I the Restorer, sealed by the latter's marriage to Yaroslav's sister, Maria.

Yaroslav's eldest son, Vladimir, ruled in Novgorod from 1034 and supervised relations in the north.

Later in the reign of Yaroslav, around c. 1035, an expedition under the command of Ingvar the Far-Travelled set out from Sweden towards the East. This was ostensibly done by the now King of Sweden Anund Jakob to assist his father's ally, king Yaroslav, in his struggle against the Byzantines and Pechenegs. The men under Ingvar made it all the way to Georgia, and according to Georgian annals 3000 Swedish warriors arrived in the country. A continguent of around 700 fighters joined the Georgian king Bagrat IV in his struggle against a rebellious noble and rival Liparit IV at the Battle of Sasireti, which they lost.

Ingvar's fate is unknown, but he supposedly succumbed to disease along with a large number of his soldiers, most likely in 1041, according to a compilation of Icelandic annals by Sturla Þórðarson. According to legend, only one of his ships managed to return to Sweden.

=== Campaign against Byzantium ===
Yaroslav presented his second direct challenge to Constantinople in 1043, when a Rus' flotilla headed by one of his sons appeared near Constantinople and demanded money, threatening to attack the city otherwise. Whatever the reason, the Byzantines refused to pay and preferred to fight. The Rus' flotilla defeated the Byzantine fleet but was almost destroyed by a storm and came back to Kiev empty-handed.

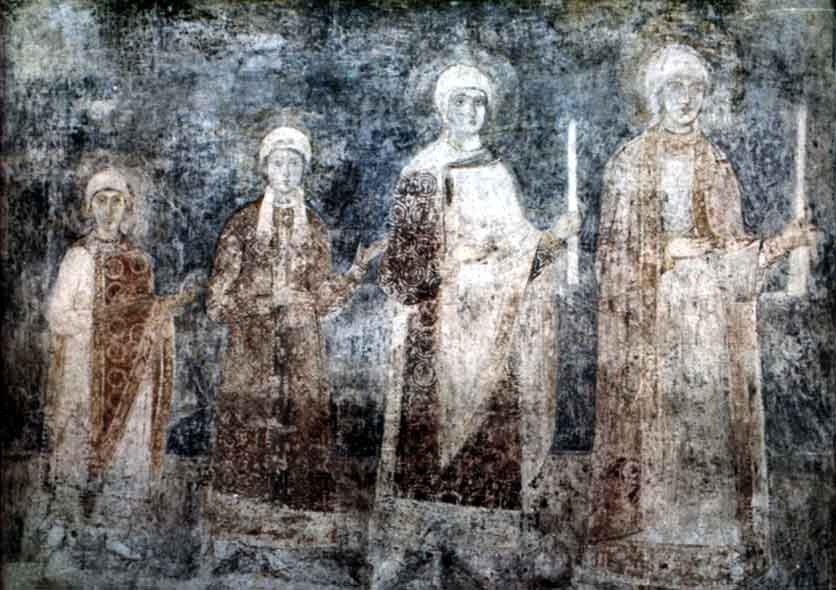
11th-century fresco of Saint Sophia's Cathedral, Kyiv, representing the daughters of Yaroslav I, with Anne probably being the youngest. Other daughters were Anastasia, wife of Andrew I of Hungary; Elizabeth, wife of Harald Hardrada; and possibly Agatha, wife of Edward the Exile

=== Protecting the inhabitants of the Dnieper from the Pechenegs ===
To defend his state from the Pechenegs and other nomadic tribes threatening it from the south he constructed a line of forts, composed of Yuriev, Bohuslav, Kaniv, Korsun, and Pereyaslavl. To celebrate his decisive victory over the Pechenegs near Kiev in 1036, who thereafter were never a threat to Kiev, he sponsored the construction of the Saint Sophia Cathedral in 1037.

In 1037 the monasteries of Saint George and Saint Irene were built, named after patron saints of Yaroslav and his wife. Some mentioned and other celebrated monuments of his reign such as the Golden Gate of Kiev were destroyed during the Mongol invasion of Rus', but later restored.

=== Establishment of law ===
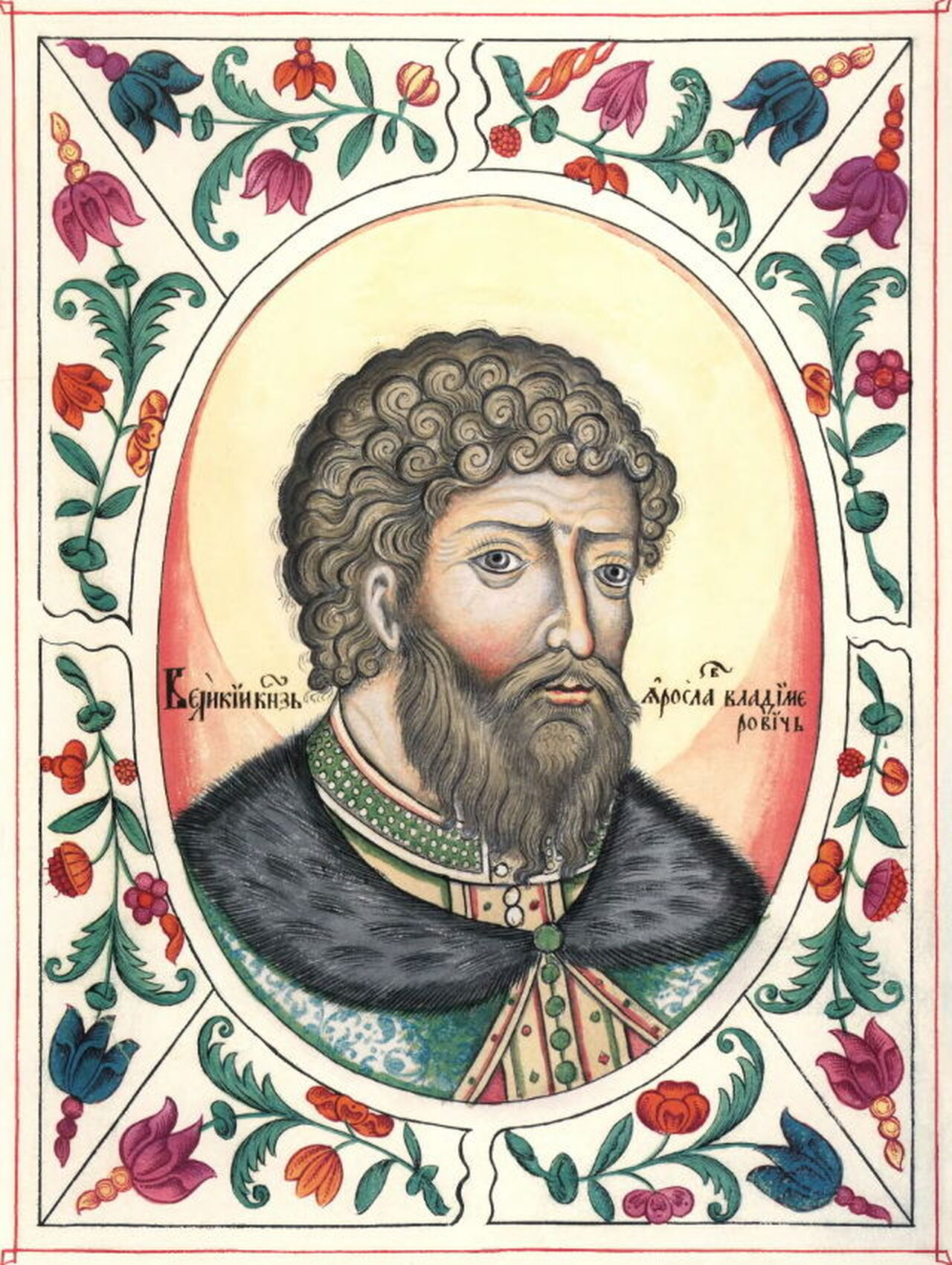
Portrait in the Tsarsky titulyarnik (1672)

Yaroslav was a notable patron of literary culture and learning. In 1051, he had a Slavic monk, Hilarion of Kiev, proclaimed the metropolitan bishop of Kiev, thus challenging the Byzantine tradition of placing Greeks on the episcopal sees. Hilarion's discourse on Yaroslav and his father Vladimir is frequently cited as the first work of Old East Slavic literature.

== Family life and posterity ==
In 1019, Yaroslav married Ingegerd Olofsdotter, daughter of Olof Skötkonung, the king of Sweden. He gave Ladoga to her as a marriage gift.

Saint Sophia's Cathedral in Kiev houses a fresco representing the whole family: Yaroslav, Irene (as Ingegerd was known in Rus'), their four daughters and six sons. Yaroslav had at least three of his daughters married to foreign princes who lived in exile at his court:

- Elisiv of Kiev to Harald Hardrada (who attained her hand by his military exploits in the Byzantine Empire);
- Anastasia of Kiev to the future Andrew I of Hungary;
- Anne of Kiev married Henry I of France and was the regent of France during their son's minority (she was Yaroslav the Wise's most beloved daughter);
- (possibly) Agatha, wife of Edward the Exile, of the royal family of England, the mother of Edgar the Ætheling and Saint Margaret of Scotland.

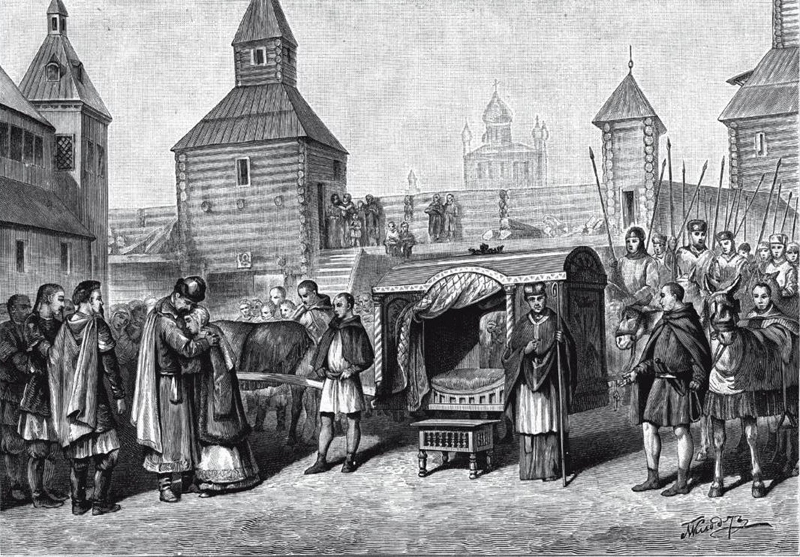
Anne of Kiev

Yaroslav had one son from the first marriage (his Christian name being Ilya (?–1020)), and six sons from the second marriage. Apprehending the danger that could ensue from divisions between brothers, he exhorted them to live in peace with each other. The eldest of these, Vladimir of Novgorod, best remembered for building the Cathedral of St. Sophia, Novgorod, predeceased his father. Vladimir succeeded Yaroslav as prince of Novgorod in 1034.

Three other sons—Iziaslav I, Sviatoslav II, and Vsevolod I—reigned in Kiev one after another. The youngest children of Yaroslav were Igor Yaroslavich (1036–1060) of Volhynia and Vyacheslav Yaroslavich (1036–1057) of the Principality of Smolensk. There is almost no information about Vyacheslav. Some documents point out the fact of him having a son, Boris Vyacheslavich, who challenged Vsevolod I sometime in 1077–1078.

== Grave ==
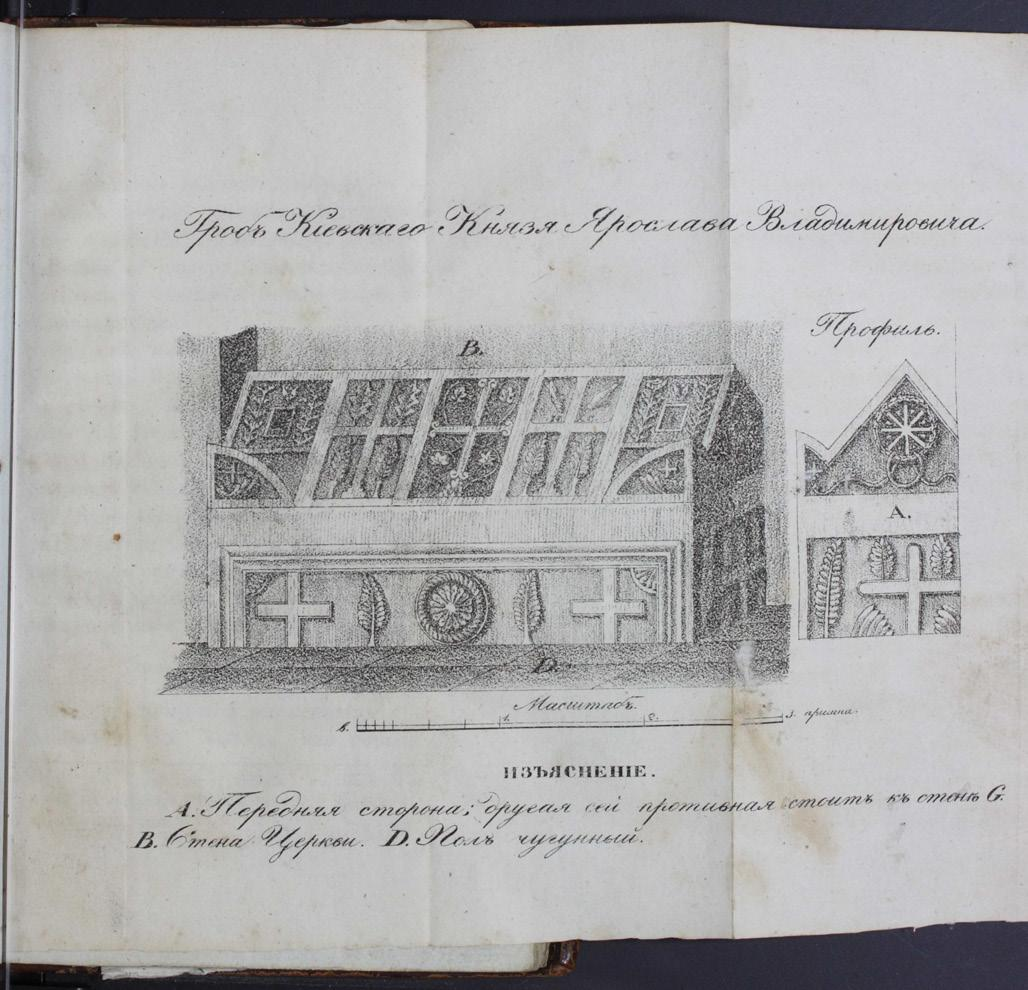
The sarcophagus of Yaroslav the Wise

Following his death, the body of Yaroslav the Wise was entombed in a white marble sarcophagus within Saint Sophia's Cathedral. In 1936, the sarcophagus was opened and found to contain the skeletal remains of two individuals, one male and one female. The male was determined to be Yaroslav. The identity of the female was never established, though some believe them to be those of Yaroslav's spouse Ingegerd. The sarcophagus was again opened in 1939 and the remains removed for research, not being documented as returned until 1964.

In 2009, the sarcophagus was opened and surprisingly found to contain only one skeleton, that of a female. It seems the documents detailing the 1964 reinterment of the remains were falsified to hide the fact that Yaroslav's remains had been lost. Subsequent questioning of individuals involved in the research and reinterment of the remains seems to point to the idea that Yaroslav's remains were purposely hidden prior to the German occupation of Ukraine and then either lost completely or stolen and transported to the United States, where many ancient religious artifacts were placed to avoid "mistreatment" by the communists.

== Legacy ==
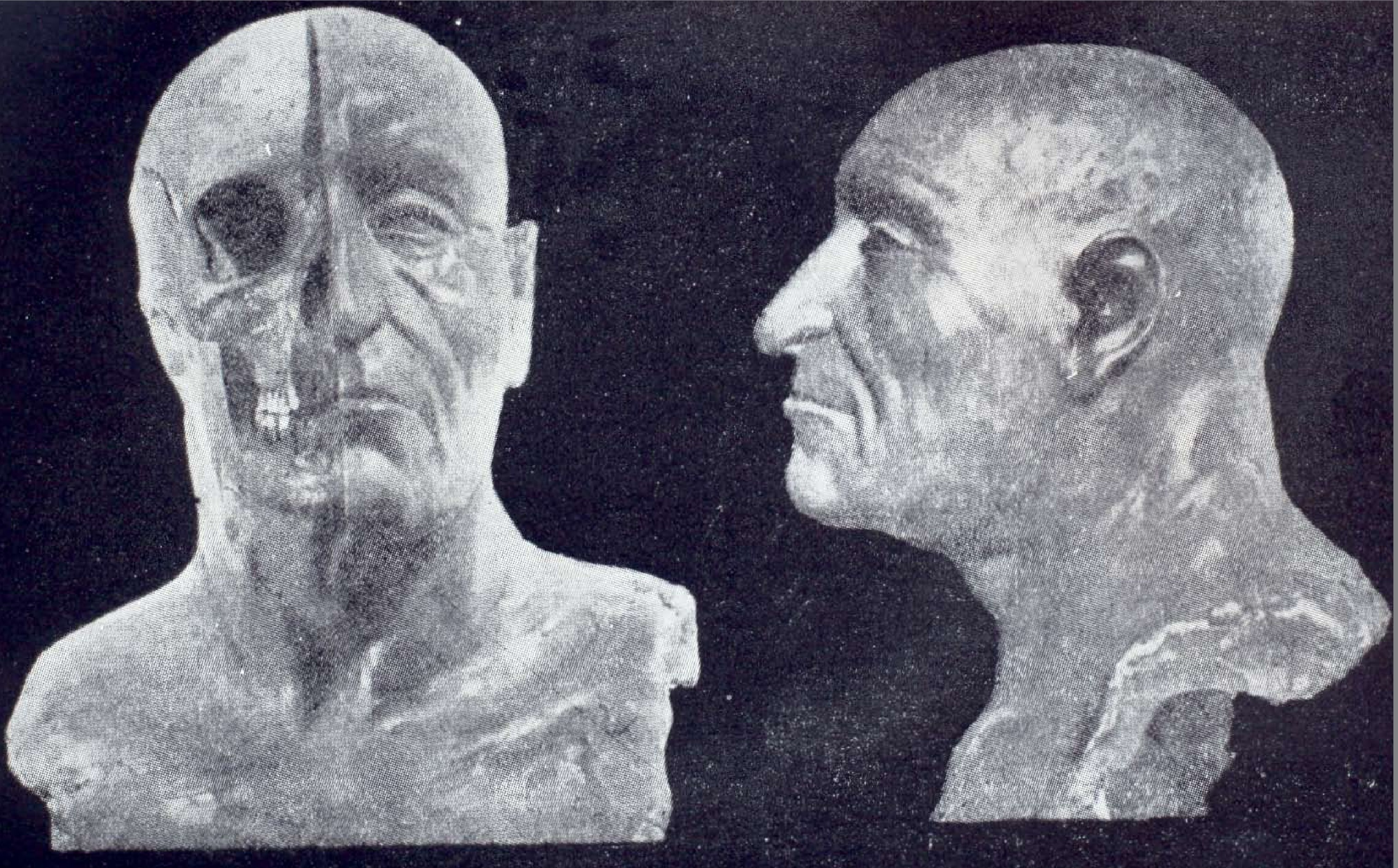
Facial reconstruction of Yaroslav the Wise made by Mikhail Gerasimov using a mould of the now-lost skull, 1940

Four towns in four countries were named after Yaroslav, three of which he also founded: Yaroslavl (in today's Russia), Jarosław in Poland, Yuryev (now Bila Tserkva, Ukraine), and another Yuryev in place of conquered Tarbatu (now Tartu) between 1030 and 1061 in Estonia. Following the Russian custom of naming military objects such as tanks and planes after historical figures, the helmet worn by many Russian soldiers during the Crimean War was called the "Helmet of Yaroslav the Wise". It was the first pointed helmet to be used by a modern army, even before German troops wore pointed helmets.

In 2008 Yaroslav was placed first (with 40% of the votes) in their ranking of "our greatest compatriots" by the viewers of the TV show Velyki Ukraintsi. Afterwards, one of the producers of The Greatest Ukrainians claimed that Yaroslav had only won because of vote manipulation and that (if that had been prevented) the real first place would have been awarded to Stepan Bandera.

In 2003, a monument to Yaroslav the Wise was erected in Kyiv, Ukraine. The creators of the monument are Boris Krylov and Oles Sydoruk. Various streets are named after the prince in cities throughout Ukraine including Yaroslavska Street and Yaroslaviv Val in Kyiv.

The Yaroslav Mudryi National Law University in Kharkiv is named after him.

Iron Lord was a 2010 feature film based on Yaroslav's early life as a regional prince on the frontier.

On 12 December 2022, on the Constitution Day of the Russian Federation, a monument to Yaroslav the Wise was unveiled at the site near the Novgorod Technical School. The author of the monument is sculptor Sergey Gaev.

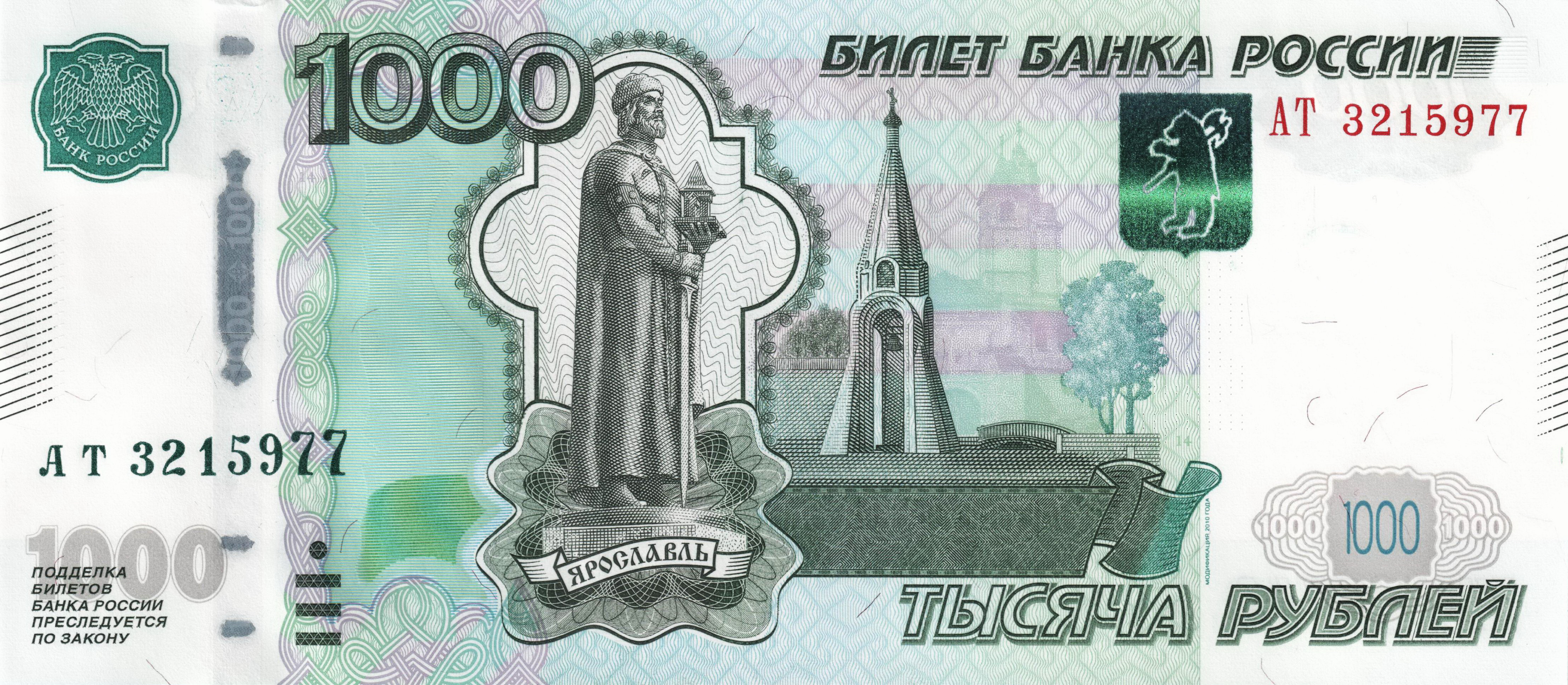
Yaroslav's monument in Yaroslavl as depicted on the ₽1000 banknote

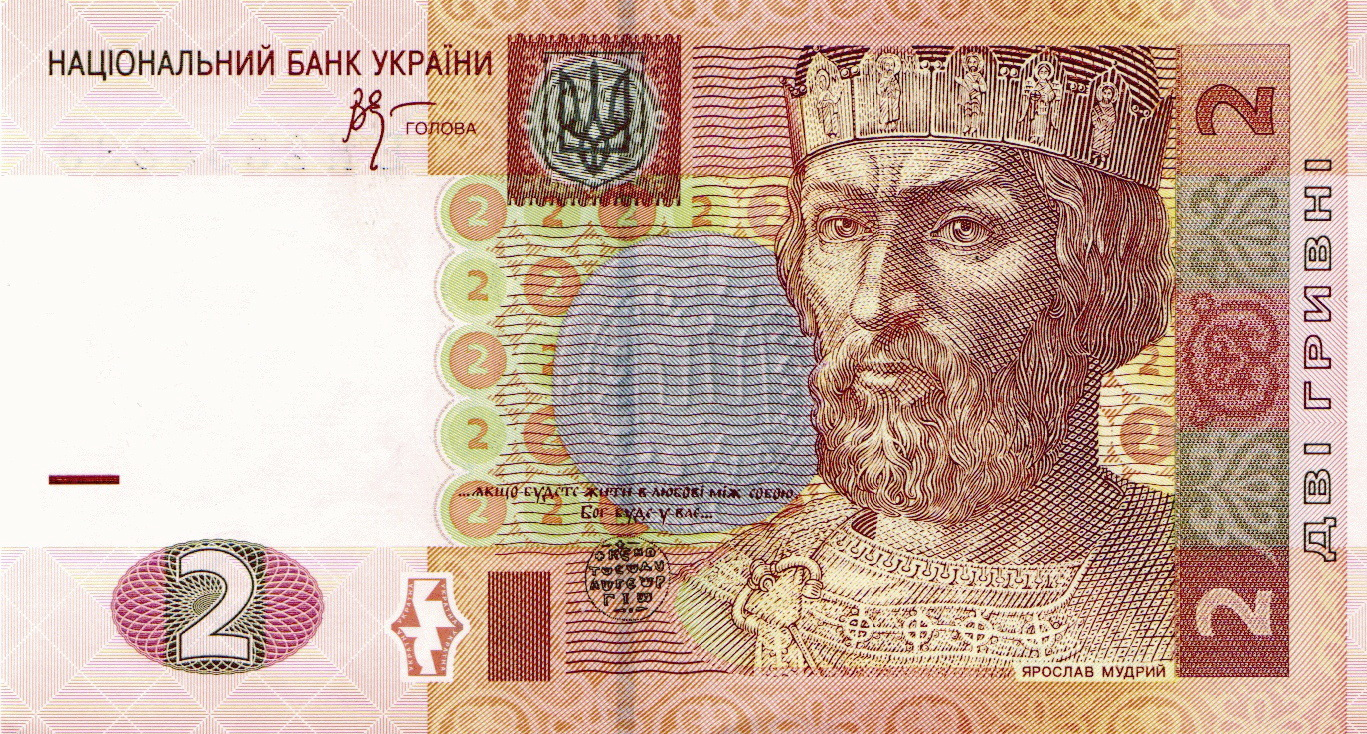
The ₴2 banknote with a portrait of Yaroslav the Wise

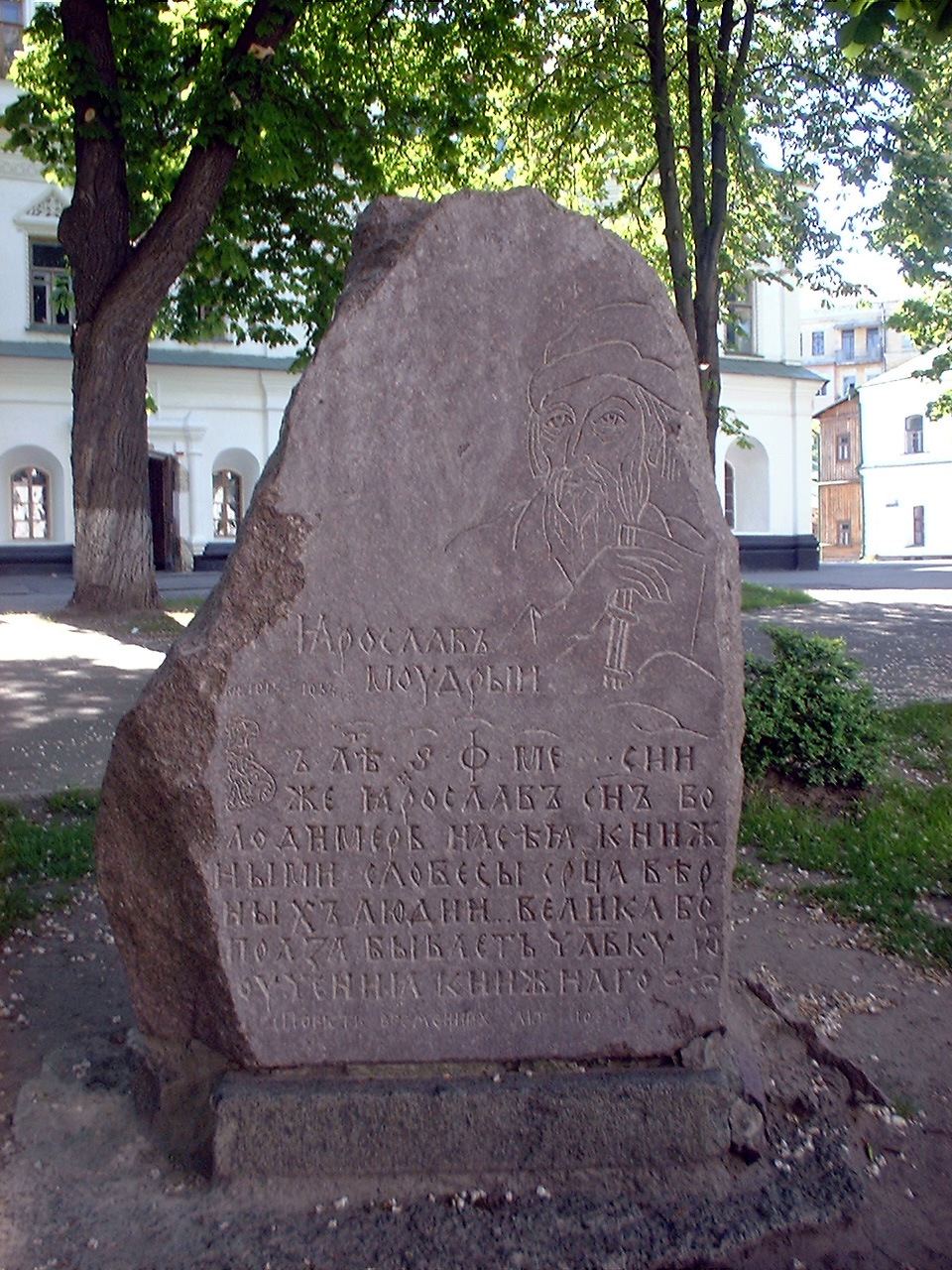
Yaroslav's Rock

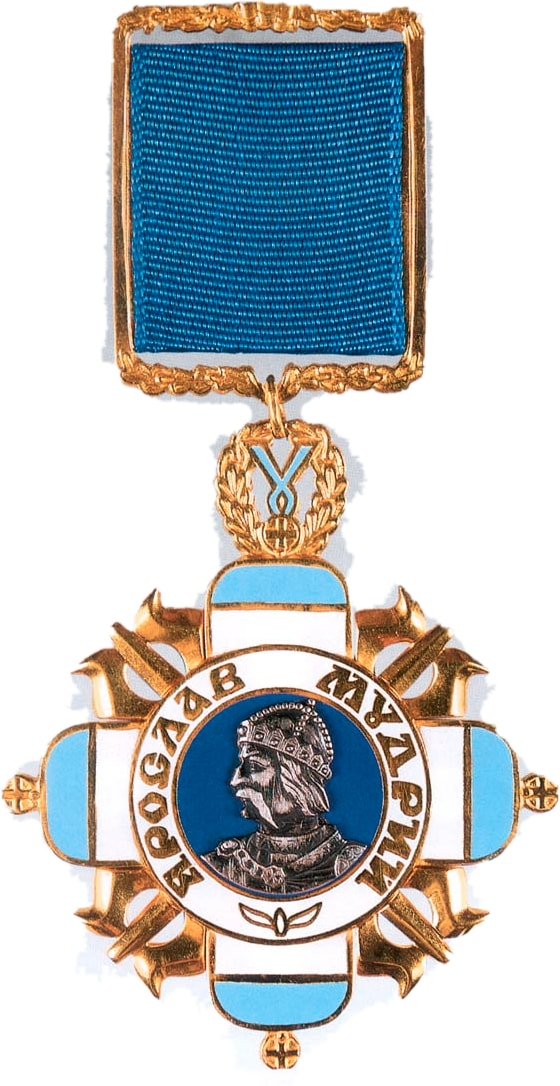
The Ukrainian Order of Prince Yaroslav the Wise

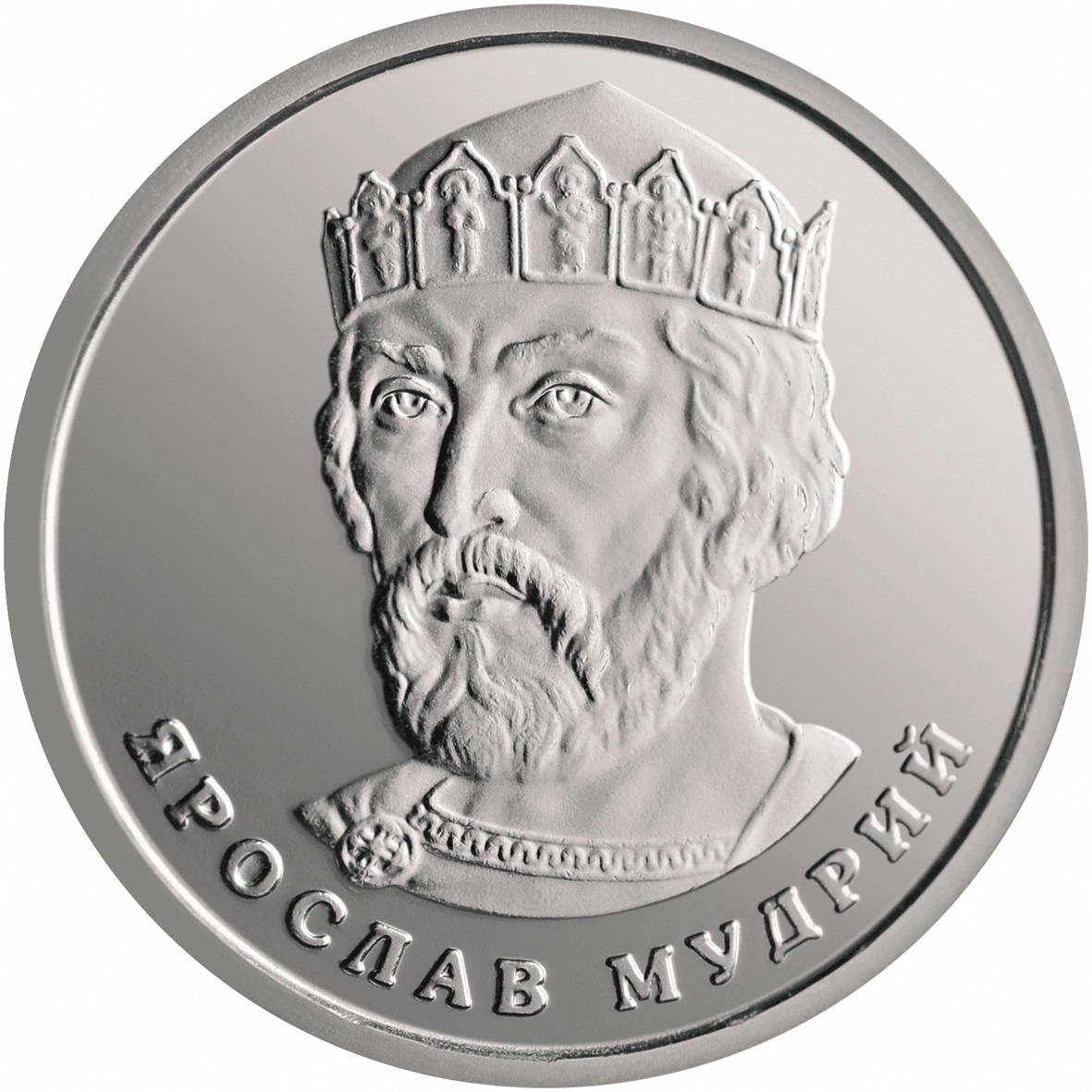
Reverse of the two hryvnia coin, Ukraine, 2018

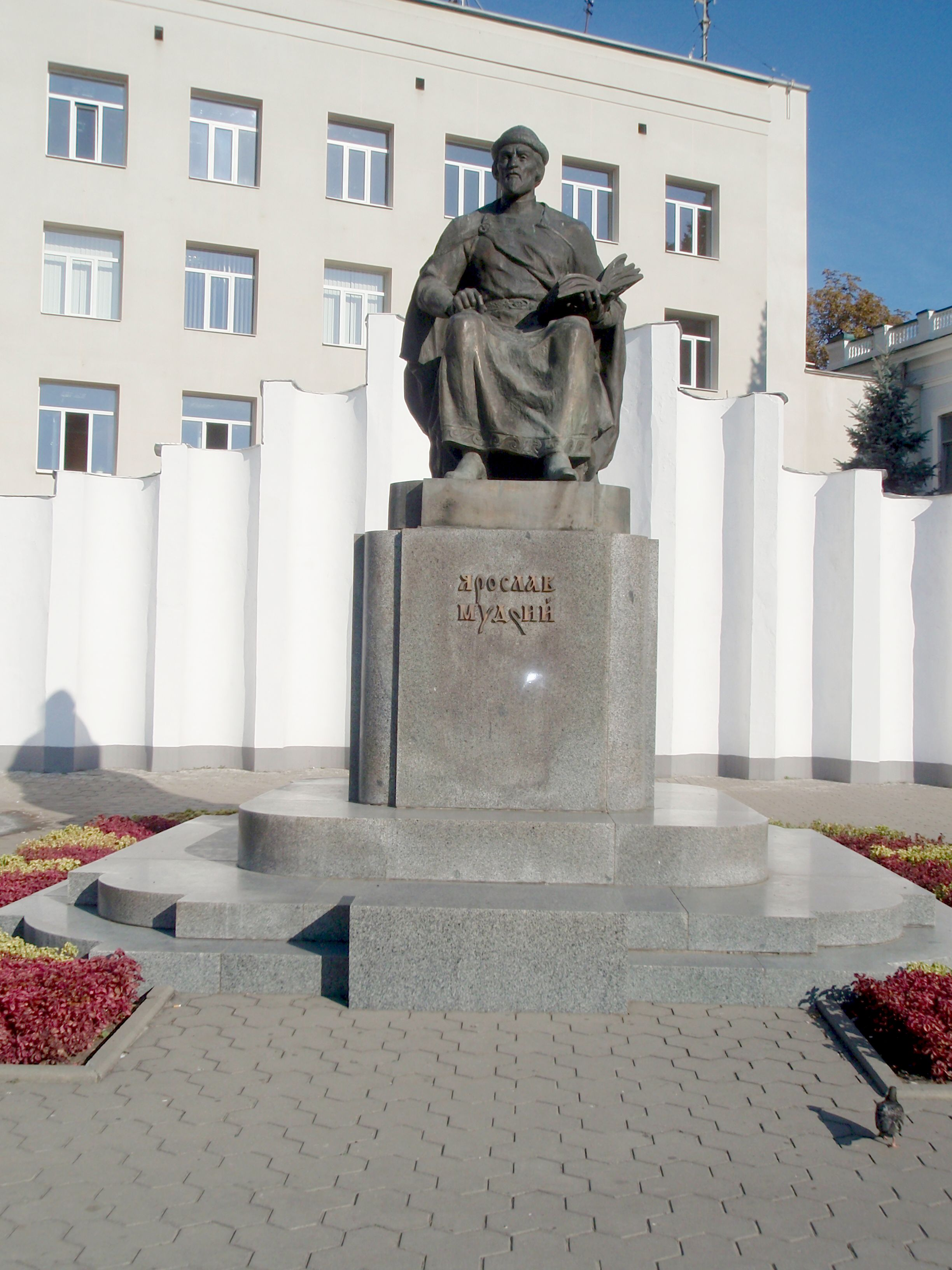
Monument to Yaroslav the Wise in Kharkiv

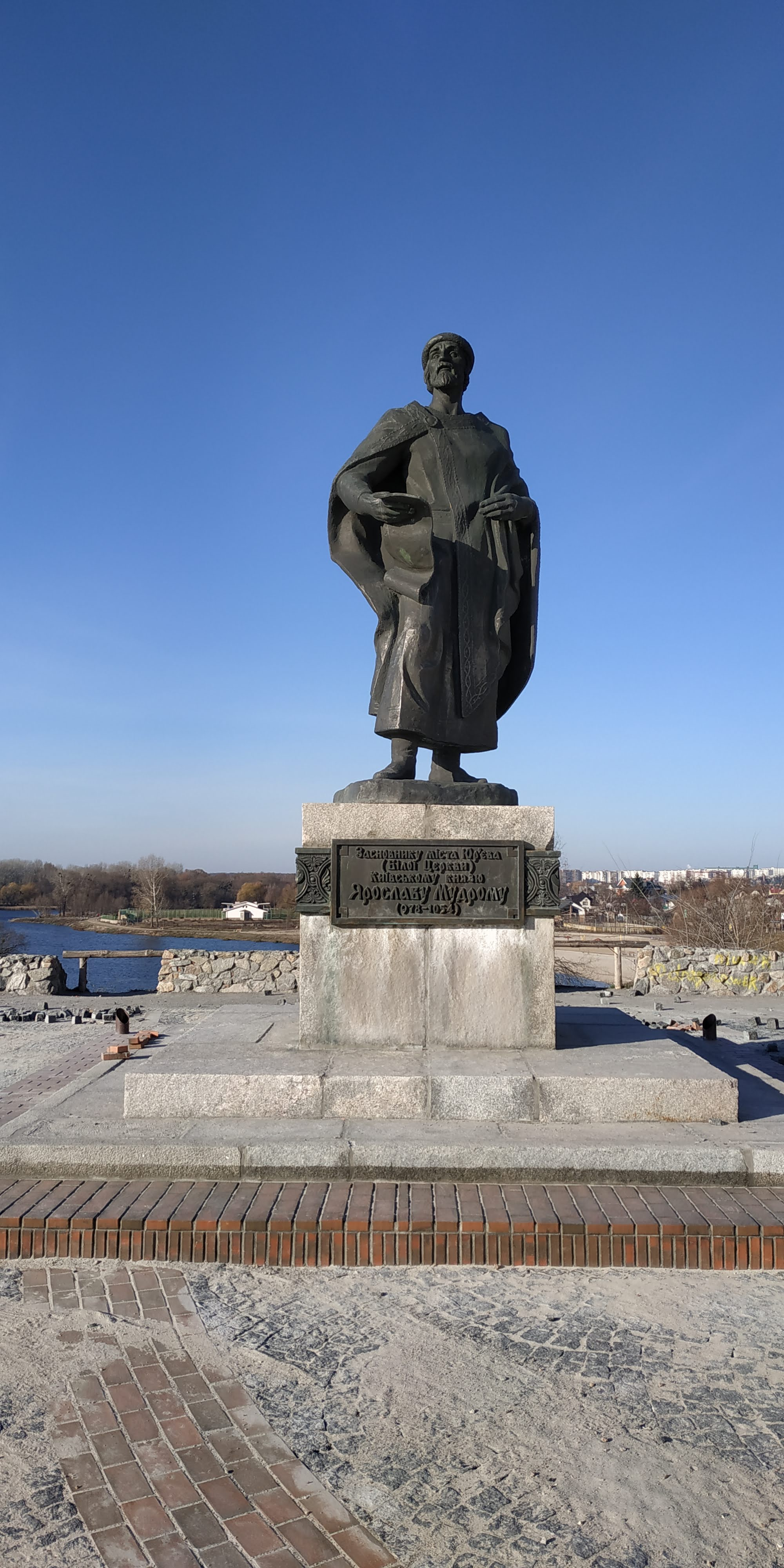
Monument to Yaroslav the Wise in the city of Bila Tserkva

== Veneration ==
Saint Yaroslav the Wise
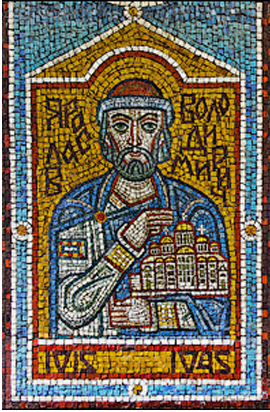
- Yaroslav the Wise's consolidation of Kiev and Novgorod as depicted at Zoloti Vorota mosaics

Holy Grand Prince, Right-Believing
- Venerated in: Catholic Church; Eastern Orthodox Church
- Canonized: 3 February 2016, Moscow by Bishops' Council of the Russian Orthodox Church
- Major shrine: Saint Sophia Cathedral, Kyiv
- Feast: 20 February
- Attributes: Grand Prince's robes, sword, church model, book or scroll
- Patronage: Statesmen, Judges, Jurists, Prosecutors, Temple Builders, Librarians, Research, Scientists, Teacher, Students, Kievans

Yaroslav was at the earliest named a saint by Adam of Bremen in his "Deeds of Bishops of the Hamburg Church" in 1075. On 9 March 2004, on his 950th death anniversary he was included in the calendar of saints of the Ukrainian Orthodox Church (Moscow Patriarchate). On 8 December 2005, Patriarch Alexy II of Moscow added his name to the Menologium as a local saint. On 3 February 2016, the Council of Bishops of the Russian Orthodox Church held in Moscow established church-wide veneration of "Saint Blessed Knyaz Yaroslav the Wise", noticing that he was one of the saints widely venerated in the Russian Orthodox Church, but missing from the official church-wide veneration.

== Sources ==
- Cross, Samuel Hazzard (1929). "Yaroslav the Wise in Norse Tradition" (PDF). Speculum. 4 (2). University of Chicago Press: 177–197. doi:10.2307/2847951. JSTOR 2847951.
- Hynes, Mary Ellen; Mazar, Peter (1993). Companion to the Calendar: A Guide to the Saints and Mysteries of the Christian Calendar. LiturgyTrainingPublications. p. 105. ISBN 978-1-56854-011-5.
- Martin, Janet (1995). Medieval Russia, 980–1584. Cambridge: Cambridge University Press. ISBN 0-521-36276-8.
- Nazarenko, A. V. (2001). Drevniaia Rus' na mezhdunarodnykh putiakh: mezhdistsiplinarnye ocherki kul'turnykh, torgovykh, politicheskikh sviazei IX–XII vekov (in Russian). Moscow: Russian History Institute. ISBN 5-7859-0085-8.
- Le Clerk, JM. Path of Ravens: The Last Varangian, Printed in France by Amazon. ISBN 9798307122136.

Yaroslav I the Wise Rurik Born: 978 Died: 1054
Regnal titles
New title	Prince of Rostov; 996–1010	Succeeded by Boris Vladimirich
Preceded by Vyachelav Vladimirich	Prince of Novgorod; 1010–1034	Succeeded by Vladimir Yaroslavich
Preceded by Sviatopolk I Vladimirich	Grand Prince of Kiev; 1019–1054	Succeeded by Iziaslav I Yaroslavich
