= Kijevac =

Kijevac may refer to the following places in Serbia:

- Kijevac (Babušnica)
- Kijevac (Surdulica)
