= Vyacheslav Yaroslavich =

Vyacheslav Yaroslavich or Viacheslav Yaroslavich was the Prince of Smolensk from 1054 until his death in 1059.

He was son of Yaroslav the Wise and Ingegerd Olofsdotter of Sweden.

About Vyacheslav, there is almost no information. Some documents point out the fact of him having a son, Boris Vyacheslavich, who challenged Vsevolod I sometime in 1077-1078.

== Sources ==
- Dimnik, Martin (1994). The Dynasty of Chernigov, 1054–1146. Pontifical Institute of Mediaeval Studies. ISBN 0-88844-116-9.
- Franklin, Simon; Shepard, Jonathan (1996). The Emergence of Rus 750–1200. Longman. ISBN 0-582-49091X.
- The Russian Primary Chronicle: Laurentian Text (Translated and edited by Samuel Hazzard Cross and Olgerd P. Sherbowitz-Wetzor) (1953). Medieval Academy of America. ISBN 978-0-915651-32-0.
