= Nuovo Testamento =

Italian-American dance music group

- Origin: Los Angeles, United States / Bologna, Italy
- Genres: Italo disco, synth-pop, Hi-NRG, coldwave, post-punk
- Years active: 2019–present
- Label: Avant! Records
- Members: Chelsey Crowley; Giacomo Zatti; Andrea Mantione

Nuovo Testamento is an Italian-American musical trio based between Los Angeles, United States, and Bologna, Italy. The group consists of vocalist Chelsey Crowley, drummer Giacomo Zatti, and synthesist Andrea Mantione. Their sound blends Italo disco, synthpop, Hi-NRG, and post-punk aesthetics.

Formed in 2019, the band is often considered a supergroup due to its members’ previous involvement in hardcore punk and post-punk acts such as Horror Vacui, Tørsö, and Crimson Scarlet.

== History ==
Nuovo Testamento formed in 2019 and released their debut EP Exposure via Avant! Records. The release showcased a coldwave-oriented sound rooted in minimal synth textures and gothic atmospheres. The band has expressed a love of electronic groups like Depeche Mode, New Order, and OMD.

In 2021, the group released their debut full-length album New Earth. The record marked a stylistic shift toward dance-oriented genres, incorporating Italo disco, synthpop, and Hi-NRG influences.

In 2023, Nuovo Testamento released their second album Love Lines. Following its release, the band toured extensively across Europe and North America, performing alongside acts such as Molchat Doma and The Soft Moon.

During this period, they also expanded their presence within the alternative electronic network through remix and collaborative work with artists such as Drab Majesty, Curses, and Scowl.

In 2025, the band released the EP Trouble, continuing their exploration of synth-driven dark pop and Italo disco aesthetics. The release features shimmering synthesizers, driving rhythmic structures, and Chelsey Crowley's ethereal vocal style. The band continues to tour internationally.

== Members ==
- Chelsey Crowley – vocals
- Giacomo Zatti – synth drums
- Andrea Mantione – synthesizer

== Discography ==
=== Studio albums ===
- New Earth (Avant! Records, 2021)
- Love Lines (Discoteca Italia, 2023)

=== EPs ===
- Exposure (Avant! Records, 2019)
- Trouble (Discoteca Italia, 2025)

=== Singles ===
- “Heartbeat” (2023)
- “Heat” (2023)
- “In My Dreams” (2024)
- “Picture Perfect” (2025)
- “Dream On” (2025)
- “On the Edge” (2025)
