= Siege of Kiev (1036) =

Siege of Rus' capital by nomads (1036 CE)

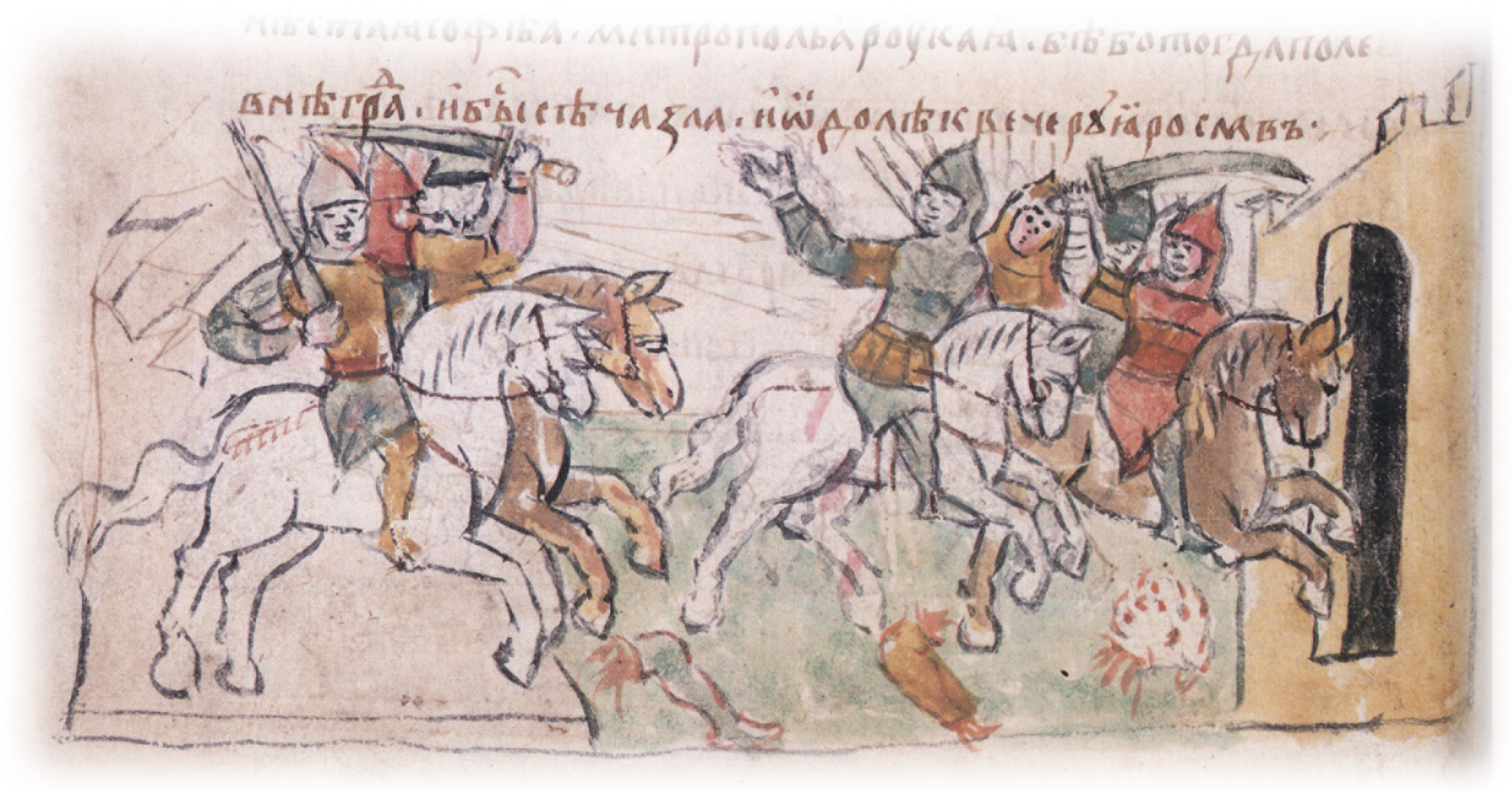
- Defeat of Pechenegs near Kiev in 1036 (15th century depiction)
Date	1036
Location	Kiev, Kievan Rus' (present-day Ukraine)
Result	Rus' victory
Territorial changes	Pechenegs cease raids on Kievan Rus'

Belligerents
Kievan Rus'	Pecheneg Khanate

Commanders and leaders
Yaroslav the Wise	Unknown

Strength
Unknown	Unknown; more than Rus'

Casualties and losses
Unknown	Entire army annihilated

The Siege of Kiev was conducted by Pecheneg Khanate against the capital of the Kievan Rus' defended by Prince Yaroslav the Wise, which took place in 1036. It ended in a crushing defeat for Pechenegs, which led to their annihilation.

== Prelude ==
In 1024, Yaroslav the Wise was in conflict with his brother, Mstislav of Chernigov. A battle took place between them at Listven, in which Mstislav defeated Yaroslav, forcing him to give up lands East of the Dnieper River. These lands only returned under Yaroslav's control in 1036, after Mstislav had passed away. Yaroslav sought alliances and close ties with other European states through royal intermarriages. Kievan Rus' occupied a notable places among European states, wither others European rulers also seeking closer ties with Prince Yaroslav the Wise. However, Prince Yaroslav would have to deal with the last major Pecheneg attack on the Rus' capital of Kiev in 1036, as the fortifications previously built to fend off Pechenegs didn't stop their raids.

== Siege ==
According to Ruthenian chronicle (translated from Hypatian Codex), there was a "fierce slaughter" taking place between the Pechenegs and Rus' army of Yaroslav the Wise, after the Pechenegs "like wild beasts" attacked from all directions and killed a certain "Prince Boris" with his servant. The Pechenegs moved to a place of where the present-day Saint Sophia Cathedral is located. Afterwards, by the evening, Yaroslav the Wise managed to triumph in battle and scatter the Pechenegs, forcing their surviving forces to flee. However, the fleeing Pechenegs ended up drowning in Sytomla and other rivers during their chaotic retreat.

== Aftermath ==
The military power of Pechenegs was shattered as a result of their devastating defeat near Kiev. Their remnants split, either fleeing to the Balkans or joining Torks, which was another Turkic Khanate that appeared in the mid-11th century, before also getting crushed by the Kievan Rus'.

== Legacy ==
Prince Yaroslav the Wise ordered to construct Saint Sophia Cathedral at the place where the Pechenegs were defeated.
