= Lebanon Hanover =

Swiss–British music duo

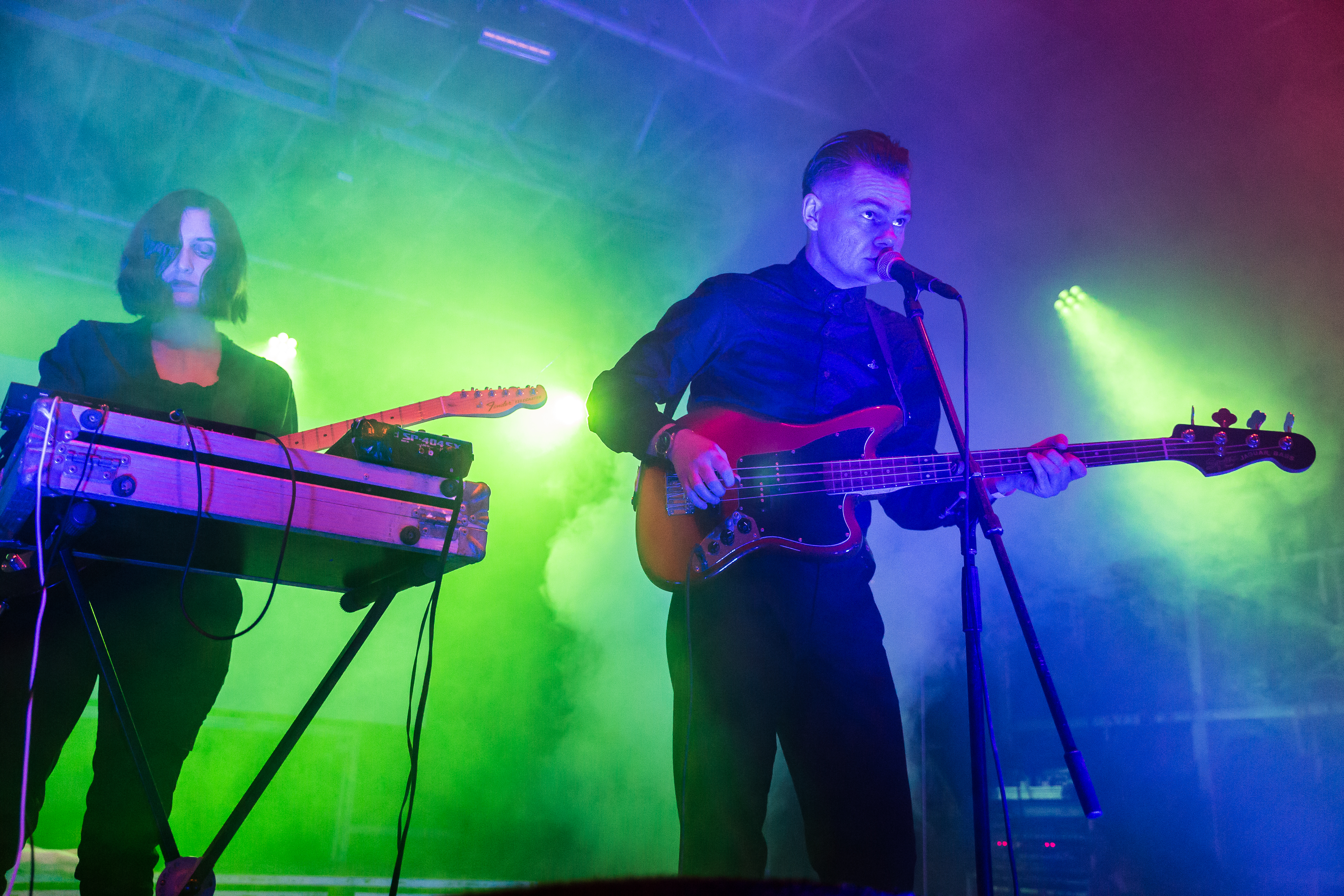
- Lebanon Hanover performing in 2017

Background information
- Origin: Sunderland, England
- Genres: Coldwave; darkwave; minimal wave
- Years active: 2010–present
- Label: Fabrika Records
- Members: Larissa Iceglass; William Maybelline
- Website: www.lebanonhanover.com

Lebanon Hanover is a Swiss–British music duo formed in 2010 in Sunderland, England. It consists of Swiss vocalist, guitarist and synthesist Larissa Iceglass and British vocalist, bassist and synthesist William Maybelline. William Maybelline also has a solo project called Qual, through which he explores a darker and more aggressive electronic sound, incorporating elements of EBM, industrial, and minimal synth.

The group is signed to Greece's Fabrika Records and has released seven studio albums to date. Their name comes from two neighbouring towns (Lebanon and Hanover) in New Hampshire, United States.

== History ==
Band members Larissa Iceglass (born Larissa Georgiou) and William Maybelline (born William Morris), who lived in Berlin, Germany and Newcastle, England, respectively at the time, met each other through the music social media website Last.fm, where they traded 80s music recommendations with each other. In 2010, Iceglass travelled to Sunderland to meet Maybelline in person for the first time, and the two formed Lebanon Hanover soon after, naming the band after two towns in New Hampshire.

Lebanon Hanover played its first show in October 2010 at Berlin's King Kong Club. In 2011, they released a split EP with La Fete Triste, which caught the eye of Fabrika Records, and the band was signed to the label shortly after. The band released their debut album The World is Getting Colder in 2012. They released their second album, Why Not Just Be Solo, on Halloween later that same year. The duo moved back to Maybelline's parents' house to begin work on their third album, Tomb for Two, which was described as marking the end of a trilogy. The single "Gallowdance" from the album received heavy play in clubs around the time, and the album was released in 2013. However, upon touring North America, the band was refused entry into the United States due to visa issues, forcing the cancellation of the rest of their American dates. Iceglass and Maybelline split romantically in 2013, with Iceglass remaining in Berlin as Maybelline resided in Greece.

The band's fourth album Besides the Abyss was released in 2015, followed by their fifth album Let Them Be Alien in 2018. Iceglass moved to Greece during the making of that record, having grown bored of Berlin. It also featured a stylistic change, incorporating elements of black metal, shoegaze and neofolk. In 2019, the band announced another United States tour, which was cancelled a month before because their visa request was denied by the United States government. The band's sixth album, Sci-Fi Sky, was released in 2020 and supported by the singles "The Last Thing" and "Digital Ocean".

In 2023, the band played multiple European festivals including Primavera Sound and Wave-Gotik-Treffen. Lebanon Hanover returned to the United States in October 2023 to play six shows, their first American dates in 10 years. In November 2023, the band released the single "Better Than Going Under" with the B-side "Kyiv".

== Musical style ==
Lebanon Hanover's music has been compared to 1980s gothic rock and post-punk acts such as Siouxsie and the Banshees, The Cure and Bauhaus. The band has a minimal, dark sound. Their songs have a signature light synth sound, deep bass and melancholic lyrics. Iceglass has stated that she finds bands with "depth and honesty" like Malaria!, Kraftwerk, D.A.F. and The Smiths inspiring.

== Discography ==
- 2011: Lebanon Hanover / La Fete Triste (split EP with La Fete Triste)
- 2012: The World Is Getting Colder (album, Fabrika Records)
- 2012: Why Not Just Be Solo (album, Fabrika Records)
- 2013: Tomb for Two (album, Fabrika Records / Dead Scarlet Records / Mecanica Records)
- 2013: Gallowdance (single)
- 2015: Besides the Abyss (album, Fabrika Records)
- 2016: Babes of the 80s (single, Fabrika Records)
- 2017: Lebanon Hanover Anthology (compilation EP, GAG TAPE)
- 2018: Let Them Be Alien (album, Fabrika Records)
- 2020: Sci-Fi Sky (album, Fabrika Records)
- 2023: Better Than Going Under (EP, Fabrika Records)
- 2025: Asylum Lullabies (album, Fabrika Records)
