= Kiev-class destroyer =

Soviet class of destroyer leaders

- Line drawings to different scales of the never-completed Kiev-class destroyers; Project 48 (top), Project 48-K (bottom)

Class overview
- Operators: Soviet Navy
- Preceded by: Tashkent class
- Succeeded by: None
- Built: 1939–1941
- Planned: 14
- Completed: 0
- Canceled: 11
- Scrapped: 3

General characteristics
- Type: Destroyer leader
- Displacement: 2,350 long tons (2,390 t) (standard); 3,045 long tons (3,094 t) (full load)
- Length: 127.8 m (419 ft 3 in) (o/a)
- Beam: 11.7 m (38 ft 5 in)
- Draft: 4.2 m (13 ft 9 in)
- Installed power: 3 water-tube boilers; 90,000 shp (67,000 kW)
- Propulsion: 3 shafts; 3 geared steam turbines
- Speed: 42 knots (78 km/h; 48 mph)
- Range: 4,100 nmi (7,600 km; 4,700 mi) at 15 knots (28 km/h; 17 mph)
- Complement: 264
- Armament: 3 × twin 130 mm (5.1 in) guns; 1 × twin 76 mm (3 in) AA guns; 4 × twin 12.7 mm (0.5 in) machine guns; 2 × quintuple 533 mm (21 in) torpedo tubes; 86 mines; 2 × depth charge throwers and 30 depth charges

The Kiev class (Russian: Киев) (officially designated as Project 48) was designed in 1939 for the Soviet Navy as a smaller class of destroyer leaders after the cancellation of the Tashkent-class ships that had been intended to be built in the Soviet Union. Only three ships were begun; one was cancelled and scrapped before the Axis invasion in mid-1941 and construction of the other two was suspended during the war. The navy considered completing them under a new Project 48-K configuration afterwards, but decided against that as they would have been competing against a more modern design that lacked the stability problems that the 48-K design would have had. The Soviets either scrapped them or used them as targets.

== Background and description ==
Originally three more Tashkents were ordered to be built in the Soviet Union, but it proved to be too difficult to marry the Italian design with Soviet shipbuilding practices and they were cancelled. Instead, the Soviets designed the Kiev class to be a smaller version with much the same armament as the Tashkent class. The Soviet Navy envisioned building 13 Kiev class ships in 1937 during the Third Five-Year Plan and then proposed 30 ships in its shipbuilding proposal in August 1939, but the government decided to only build half that number, with twelve in the first part of the five-year plan and two in the latter part. Of these twelve ships, the first eight were ordered as part of the Third Five-Year Plan–three ships for the Black Sea Fleet and five for the Baltic Fleet–and the remaining four on 10 April 1941, split between the Black Sea and Northern Fleets. The remaining ships were intended to be ordered as part of the Fourth Five-Year Plan. Only three of these ships were laid down, all in 1939. On 19 October 1940, the government reevaluated the shipbuilding program in light of the changing international situation and canceled all ships that had not yet been laid down. In addition, it ordered the one ship that had been started for the Baltic Fleet to be scrapped, and the pair being built for the Black Sea Fleet to be completed. A contributing factor in this decision may have been the Project 35 large-destroyer design scheduled for 1941 which was intended to have a dual-purpose main armament and much greater range.

The Kiev-class ships had an overall length of 127.8 meters (419 ft 3 in), a beam of 11.7 meters (38 ft 5 in), and a mean draft of 4.2 meters (13 ft 9 in). The ships displaced 2,350 long tons (2,390 t) at standard load and 3,045 long tons (3,094 t) at deep load. Their crew numbered 264 officers and sailors.

The ships had three geared steam turbines, each driving one three-bladed propeller using steam from three water-tube boilers that operated at a pressure of 27 kg/cm^{2} (2,648 kPa; 384 psi) and a temperature of 350 °C (662 °F). The turbines, designed to produce 90,000 shaft horsepower (67,000 kW), were intended to give the Kievs a maximum speed of 42 knots (78 km/h; 48 mph). The ships had a maximum capacity of 750 metric tons (738 long tons) of fuel oil which gave them a range of 4,100 nautical miles (7,600 km; 4,700 mi) at 15 knots (28 km/h; 17 mph). They were equipped with a pair of 165-kilowatt (221 hp) turbo generators and a pair of diesel generators, each of 50 kilowatts (67 hp).

=== Armament ===
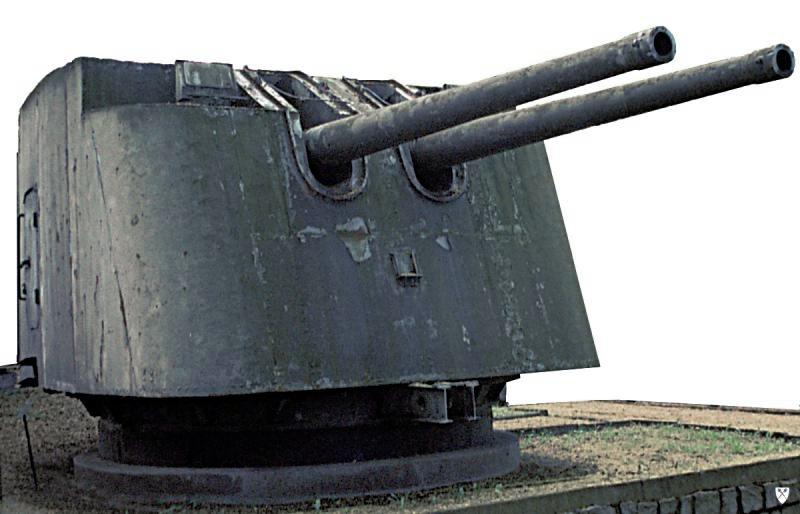
A B-2-LM turret from the Polish destroyer Wicher

The main armament of the Kiev-class ships consisted of six 50-caliber 130-millimeter (5.1 in) B-13 guns in three twin-gun B-2-LM turrets, one superfiring pair forward of the superstructure and the other mount aft of it. The ships carried 900 rounds for their guns. The B-13 gun fired a 33.4-kilogram (74 lb) shell at a muzzle velocity of 870 m/s (2,900 ft/s), which gave them a range of 25,597 meters (27,993 yd). Anti-aircraft defense was provided by a twin-gun 39-K mount for 55-caliber 76.2-millimeter (3 in) 34-K AA guns atop the rear superstructure. The 34-K guns could elevate between −5° and +85° and had a rate of fire of 15–20 rounds per minute. Their muzzle velocity of 801 meters per second (2,630 ft/s) gave their 26-pound (11.9 kg) high-explosive shells a maximum horizontal range of 14,640 meters (16,010 yd) and an effective ceiling of 6,500 meters (21,300 ft). The ships were fitted with four twin-gun mounts for 12.7-millimeter (0.50 in) DShK machine guns. The DShK had an effective rate of fire of 125 rounds per minute and an effective range against aircraft of 2,500 meters (2,700 yd).

The ships carried ten 533 mm (21 in) torpedo tubes in two rotating quintuple mounts amidships. The ships could also carry 86 Model 1926 mines and 30 depth charges–ten 135-kilogram (298 lb) BB-1s and twenty 25-kilogram (55 lb) BM-1s–which were delivered by two throwers.

== Ships ==
Construction data
Ship and (yard number)	Builder	Laid down	Launched	Fate
Kiev (357)	Shipyard No. 198 (Marti South), Nikolayev	29 September 1939	12 December 1940	Evacuated (48.9% complete), August 1941, ultimately used as a target, 1962
Erevan (358)	Shipyard No. 198 (Marti South), Nikolayev	30 December 1939	29 June 1941	Evacuated (25.4% complete), August 1941, ultimately used as a target and then scrapped
Stalinabad (542)	Shipyard No. 190 (Zhdanov), Leningrad	27 December 1939	Never	Canceled, 19 October 1940, scrapped
Unnamed (543)	Shipyard No. 190 (Zhdanov), Leningrad	Never	Never	Canceled, 19 October 1940
Unnamed (544)	Shipyard No. 190 (Zhdanov), Leningrad	Never	Never	Canceled, 19 October 1940
Ashkhabad (545)	Shipyard No. 190 (Zhdanov), Leningrad	Never	Never	Canceled, 19 October 1940
Alma-Ata (546)	Shipyard No. 190 (Zhdanov), Leningrad	Never	Never	Canceled, 19 October 1940
Petrozavadosk (359)	Shipyard No. 198 (Marti South), Nikolayev	Never	Never	Canceled, 19 October 1940
Ochakov (Note: Never allotted a yard number, the ship's name is unconfirmed.)	Shipyard No. 198 (Marti South), Nikolayev	Never	Never	Canceled, 19 October 1940
Perekop	Shipyard No. 198 (Marti South), Nikolayev	Never	Never	Canceled, 19 October 1940
Arkhangelsk	Shipyard No. 402, Molotovsk	Never	Never	Canceled, 19 October 1940
Murmansk	Shipyard No. 402, Molotovsk	Never	Never	Canceled, 19 October 1940

In July 1941, the shipbuilding program was reevaluated in light of the Axis invasion the previous month and both Kiev and Erevan were to be continued. Advancing German forces forced the ships that had been launched at Nikolayev to be evacuated in August to ports on the eastern coast of the Black Sea. The two ships were towed to various ports before ending up in Batumi, Georgia, in January 1942. They were towed back to Nikolayev on 12 April 1945 to finish building. The navy wanted to modify the design to reflect the latest war experience and the shipyard proposed in 1947 a complete modernization with weapons and radars that were still being designed. The proposal reduced the ships' speed to 36 knots (67 km/h; 41 mph) and reduced the range to 3,500 nmi (6,500 km; 4,000 mi) at 13 knots (24 km/h; 15 mph). The navy rejected this proposal and asked for a more realistic design the following year under Project 48-K.

The revised proposal equipped the ships with lighter, more efficient propulsion machinery that reduced speed to 39.5 knots (73.2 km/h; 45.5 mph) for 500 nmi (930 km; 580 mi) more range. It replaced the anti-aircraft armament with a twin-gun turret for the 55-caliber 85-millimeter (3.3 in) 52-K gun and eight water-cooled, V-11 twin-gun mounts for the 74-caliber 37-millimeter (1.5 in) 70-K AA guns. Depth-charge stowage was increased to 48 BM-1s and the torpedo tubes were replaced by the latest type. These changes increased the standard displacement by almost 400 long tons (410 t) to 2,722 long tons (2,766 t). The stability of the proposal was so limited that the latest gunnery radar could not be fitted and the ships were competing for resources with the Project 30-bis Skoryy-class destroyers of a similar size already being built. Ultimately, the navy decided that it did not need a pair of unique ships with their own special maintenance and training requirements and canceled all further development in 1950.

Kiev was towed back to Nikolaev after the war and was expended as a target during gunnery exercises in October 1946. The ship was refloated the following year and was transferred to the Caspian Sea to serve as a target for guided-missile tests. Sometime after 1960, Kiev returned to the Black Sea where she was sunk in 1962 during the testing of P-6 anti-ship missiles (NATO codename: SS-N-3 Shaddock).

Erevan was used as a barracks ship after the war. She was transferred to the Caspian in 1953 to be used as a target for anti-ship missiles. The ship was sunk during these tests, but was subsequently refloated and broken up for scrap.

== Bibliography ==
- Budzbon, Przemysław; Radziemski, Jan & Twardowski, Marek (2022). Warships of the Soviet Fleets 1939–1945. Vol. I: Major Combatants. Annapolis, Maryland: Naval Institute Press. ISBN 978-1-68247-877-6.
- Platonov, Andrey V. (2002). Энциклопедия советских надводных кораблей 1941–1945 [Encyclopedia of Soviet Surface Ships 1941–1945] (in Russian). Saint Petersburg: Poligon. ISBN 5-89173-178-9.
- Platonov, Andrey V. (2003). Советские миноносцы [Soviet Destroyers] (in Russian). Vol. Part I. Saint Petersburg: Galea Print. ISBN 5-8172-0078-3.
- Rohwer, Jürgen & Monakov, Mikhail S. (2001). Stalin's Ocean-Going Fleet: Soviet Naval Strategy and Shipbuilding Programs 1935–1953. London: Frank Cass. ISBN 0-7146-4895-7.
- Yakubov, Vladimir & Worth, Richard (2008). "The Soviet Project 7/7U Destroyers". In Jordan, John & Dent, Stephen (eds.). Warship 2008. London: Conway. pp. 99–114. ISBN 978-1-84486-062-3.
