= Siege of Dorostolon =

Byzantine military investment of the Kievan Rus in Dorostolon

Coordinates: 44°07′07″N 27°15′37″E

Siege and Battle of Dorostolon
- Part of the Rus'–Byzantine War of 970–971
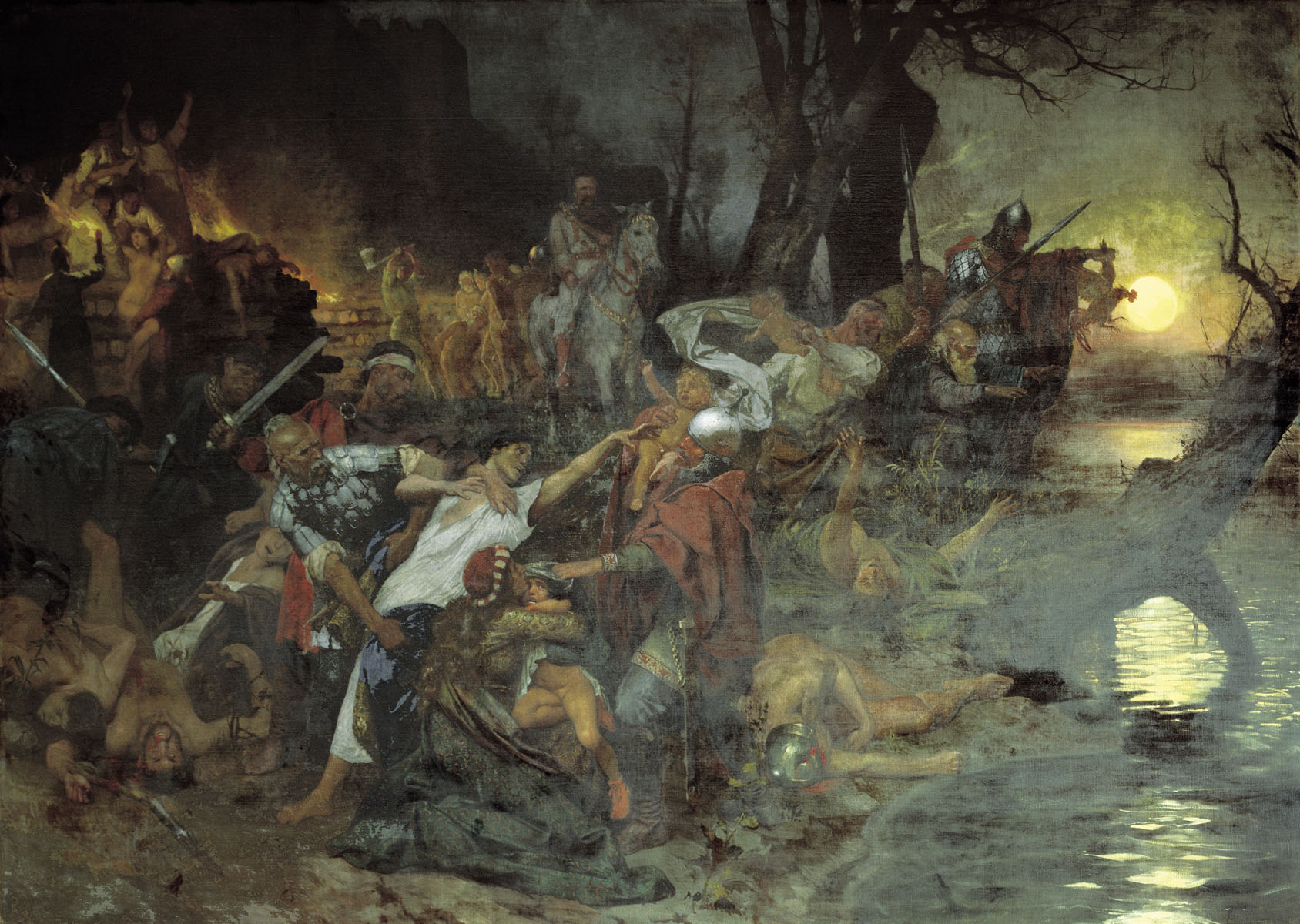
- Svyatoslav's Fighters in the Battle of Dorostolon, by Henryk Siemiradzki
| Date | 971 |
| Location | Dorostolon (modern Silistra, Bulgaria) |
| Result | Byzantine victory |

Belligerents
| Byzantine Empire | Kievan Rus'; Bulgarian Empire |

Commanders and leaders
| John I Tzimiskes | Svyatoslav I of Kiev (WIA); Ikmor † |

Strength
| 28,000–30,000; 15,000 infantry; 13,000 cavalry; 300 ships | 30,000 |

Casualties and losses
| Very heavy | 15,000+ killed or wounded |

The Siege and Battle of Dorostolon (Silistra) was fought in 971 between the Byzantine Empire and forces of Kievan Rus'. The Byzantines, led by John I Tzimiskes, were victorious.

== Background ==
During the course of the Rus'-Bulgarian war, Svyatoslav I of Kiev overran the eastern part of the First Bulgarian Empire and established his capital at Pereyaslavets on the Danube. Once John I usurped the throne, the Byzantines launched a counteroffensive. After they defeated the united Rus'-Bulgarian forces in the Battle of Arcadiopolis and recaptured Pereyaslavets, Svyatoslav was forced to flee to the northern fortress of Dorostolon (Drustur/Dorostorum).

== Siege ==
Emperor John proceeded to lay siege to Dorostolon, which lasted for 65 days. His army was reinforced by a fleet of 300 ships equipped with Greek fire. There were several engagements before the walls of the city, which demonstrated to the Byzantines that the Rus' lacked skill in cavalry warfare. Among the casualties were the Emperor's relative, John Kourkouas (whose severed head was displayed by the Rus' from one of the towers) and the second-in-command in Svyatoslav's army, a certain Ikmor (who was killed by Anemas, a son of the last Cretan emir, in revenge for Ikmor's assassination of his father during the Byzantine siege of Crete).

The Rus' and their Bulgarian allies were reduced to extremities by famine. In order to appease their gods, they drowned children in the Danube, but the sacrifices failed to improve their position. During the siege of the city of Dorostolon the Rus forces were reduced to near starvation, and a force of some 2,000 warriors, including women, made a surprise sally out during the night to search for supplies and managed to defeat a Byzantine force on the way, returning later to the city.

The Rus' felt they could not break the siege and agreed to sign a peace treaty with the Byzantine Empire, whereby they renounced their interests towards the Bulgarian lands and the city of Chersonesos in Crimea. Svyatoslav bitterly remarked that all his allies (Magyars, Pechenegs) betrayed him during this decisive moment. He was allowed to evacuate his army to Berezan Island, while the Byzantines entered Dorostolon and renamed it Theodoropolis, after the reigning empress Theodora.

After the eventual defeat of the Rus, the Byzantines were astonished at finding the bodies of armed women among the fallen warriors.

== Sources ==
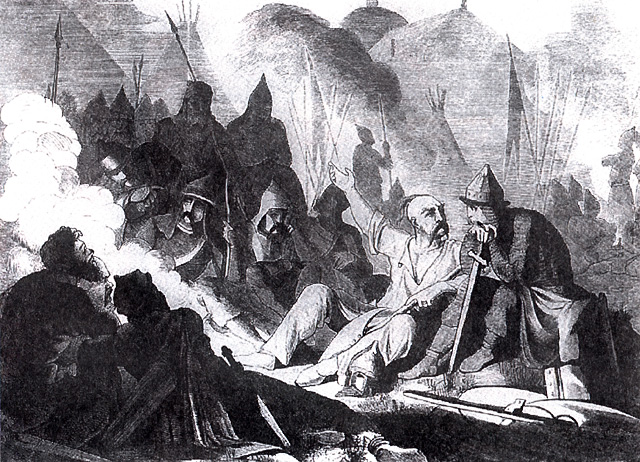
Boris Chorikov. Svyatoslav's council of war.

The siege is described in detail by John Skylitzes and Leo the Deacon, although some of their assertions (e.g., Sveneld's death during the siege) appear to be apocryphal. Characteristically, Leo the Deacon attributes the victory to Saint Theodore Stratelates, who purportedly led the Byzantine army under the walls of Dorostolon.
