= Sviatoslav I =

Prince of Kiev from 945 to 972

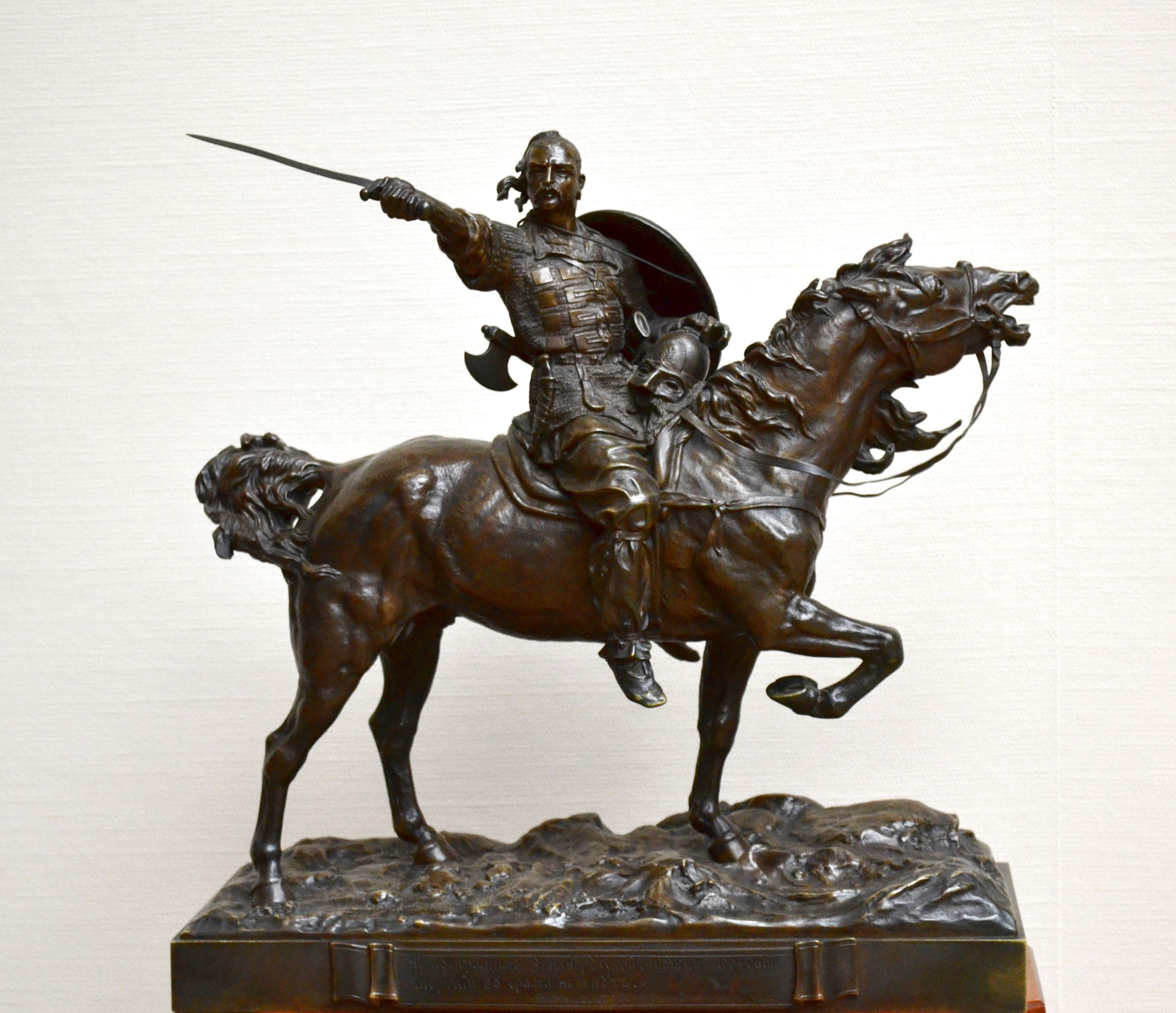
- Sviatoslav I by Eugene Lanceray (1886)

Prince of Kiev
- Reign: 945–972
- Predecessor: Igor
- Successor: Yaropolk I
- Regent: Olga (945–962)

Prince of Novgorod
- Reign: 945–970
- Predecessor: Igor
- Successor: Vladimir I
- Born: c. 943; Kiev
- Died: 972 (aged 28–29); Khortytsia
- Spouse: Predslava
- Issue: Yaropolk I; Oleg; Vladimir I
- Dynasty: Rurik
- Father: Igor of Kiev
- Mother: Olga of Kiev
- Religion: Slavic paganism
- Military career
- Allegiance: Kievan Rus'
- Branch: Military of Kievan Rus'
- Conflicts: Rus' conquest of Khazar Khaganate; Sviatoslav's invasion of Bulgaria; • Battle of Silistra; • Battle of Arcadiopolis (970); • Siege of Dorostolon; Siege of Kiev (968)

Sviatoslav I or Svyatoslav I Igorevich (Old East Slavic: Свѧтославъ Игорєвичь, romanised: Svętoslavŭ Igorevičǐ; Old Norse: Sveinald; (Note: Russian: Святослав Игоревич; Ukrainian: Святослав Ігорович, romanised: Sviatoslav Ihorovych; Belarusian: Святаслаў Ігаравіч) c. 943 – 972) was Prince of Kiev from 945 until his death in 972. He is known for his persistent campaigns in the east and south, which precipitated the collapse of two great powers in Eastern Europe, Khazaria and the First Bulgarian Empire. He conquered numerous East Slavic tribes, defeated the Alans and attacked the Volga Bulgars, and at times was allied with the Pechenegs and Magyars (Hungarians).

Following the death of his father Igor in 945, Sviatoslav's mother Olga reigned as regent in Kiev until 962. His decade-long reign over the Kievan Rus' was marked by rapid expansion into the Volga River valley, the Pontic steppe, and the Balkans, leading him to carve out for himself the largest state in Europe. In 969, he moved his seat to Pereyaslavets on the Danube. In 970, he appointed his sons Yaropolk and Oleg as subordinate princes of Kiev and Drelinia, while he appointed Vladimir, his son by his housekeeper and servant Malusha, as the prince of Novgorod.

In contrast with his mother's conversion to Christianity, Sviatoslav remained a staunch pagan all of his life. Due to his abrupt death in an ambush, his conquests, for the most part, were not consolidated into a functioning empire, while his failure to establish a stable succession led to a fratricidal feud among his three sons, resulting in the deaths of Yaropolk and Oleg, while Vladimir emerged as the sole ruler.

== Name ==
The Primary Chronicle records Sviatoslav as the first ruler of the Kievan Rus' with a name of Slavic origin, as opposed to his predecessors, whose names had Old Norse forms. Some scholars see the name of Sviatoslav, composed of the Slavic roots for "holy" and "glory", as an artificial derivation combining the names of his predecessors Oleg and Rurik, but modern researchers question the possibility of such a translation of names from one language to another. Sveinald or Sveneld is identical to Sviatoslav, as the Norse rendition of the Slavic name. The 10th-century Eastern Roman Emperor Constantine VII's Greek-language work De Administrando Imperio ("On the Governance of the Empire") records his name as Σφενδοσθλάβος ("Sfendostlabos").

== Early life and personality ==
Almost nothing is known about Sviatoslav's childhood and youth, which he spent reigning in Novgorod. Sviatoslav's father, Igor, was killed by the Drevlians around 945, and his mother, Olga, ruled as regent in Kiev until Sviatoslav reached maturity (ca. 963). Sviatoslav was tutored by a Varangian named Asmud. The tradition of employing Varangian tutors for the sons of ruling princes survived well into the 11th century. Sviatoslav appears to have had little patience for administration. His life was spent with his druzhina (roughly, "company") in permanent warfare against neighbouring states.

According to the Primary Chronicle, he carried neither wagons nor kettles on his expeditions, and he boiled no meat, rather cutting off small strips of horseflesh, game, or beef to eat after roasting it on the coals. Nor did he have a tent, rather spreading out a horse-blanket under him and setting his saddle under his head, and all his retinue did likewise.

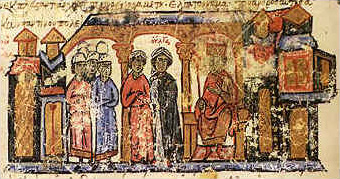
Sviatoslav's mother, Olga, with her escort in Constantinople, a miniature from the late 11th century chronicle of John Skylitzes.

Sviatoslav's appearance has been described very clearly by Leo the Deacon, who himself attended the meeting of Sviatoslav with John I Tzimiskes. Following Deacon's memories, Sviatoslav was a bright-eyed man of average height but of stalwart build, much more sturdy than Tzimiskes. He had a bald head and a wispy beard and wore a bushy moustache and a sidelock as a sign of his nobility. He preferred to dress in white, and it was noted that his garments were much cleaner than those of his men, although he had a lot in common with his warriors. He wore a single large gold earring bearing a carbuncle and two pearls.

== Religious beliefs ==
Sviatoslav's mother, Olga, converted to Orthodox Christianity at the court of the Byzantine Emperor Constantine Porphyrogenitus in 957. Sviatoslav remained a pagan all of his life. In the treaty of 971 between Sviatoslav and the Byzantine emperor John I Tzimiskes, the Rus' swore by the gods Perun and Veles. According to the Primary Chronicle, he believed that his warriors (druzhina) would lose respect for him and mock him if he became a Christian. The allegiance of his warriors was of paramount importance in his conquest of an empire that stretched from the Volga to the Danube.

== Family ==
Very little is known of Sviatoslav's family life. It is possible that he was not the only (or the eldest) son of his parents. The Rus'-Byzantine treaty of 945 mentions a certain Predslava, Volodislav's wife, as the noblest of the Rus' women after Olga. The fact that Predslava was Oleg's mother is presented by Vasily Tatishchev. He also speculated that Predslava came from the Hungarian nobility. George Vernadsky was among many historians to speculate that Volodislav was Igor's eldest son and heir who died at some point during Olga's regency. Another chronicle relates that Oleg (? – 977?) was the eldest son of Igor. At the time of Igor's death, Sviatoslav was still a child, and he was raised by his mother or under her instructions. Her influence, however, did not extend to his religious observance.

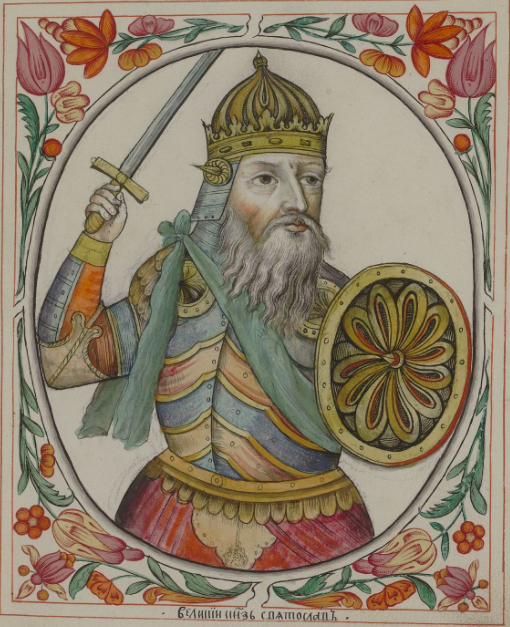
Portrait of Sviatoslav I in the Tsarsky titulyarnik, 1672

Sviatoslav had several children, but the origin of his wives is not specified in the chronicle. By his wives, he had Yaropolk and Oleg. By Malusha, a woman of indeterminate origins, Sviatoslav had Vladimir, who would ultimately break with his father's paganism and convert Rus' to Christianity. John Skylitzes reported that Vladimir had a brother named Sfengus; whether this Sfengus was a son of Sviatoslav, a son of Malusha by a prior or subsequent husband, or an unrelated Rus' nobleman is unclear.

Children

Predslava

- Oleg of Drelinia (died 977?)
- Yaropolk I of Kiev (952–978)

Malusha

- Vladimir the Great (c. 958 – 1015)
- Sfengus?

== Eastern campaigns ==
Shortly after his accession to the throne, Sviatoslav began campaigning to expand Rus' control over the Volga valley and the Pontic steppe region. His greatest success was the conquest of Khazaria, which for centuries had been one of the strongest states of Eastern Europe. The sources are not clear about the roots of the conflict between Khazaria and Rus', so several possibilities have been suggested. The Rus' had an interest in removing the Khazar hold on the Volga trade route because the Khazars collected duties from the goods transported by the Volga. Historians have suggested that the Byzantine Empire may have incited the Rus' against the Khazars, who fell out with the Byzantines after the persecutions of the Jews in the reign of Romanus I Lecapenus.

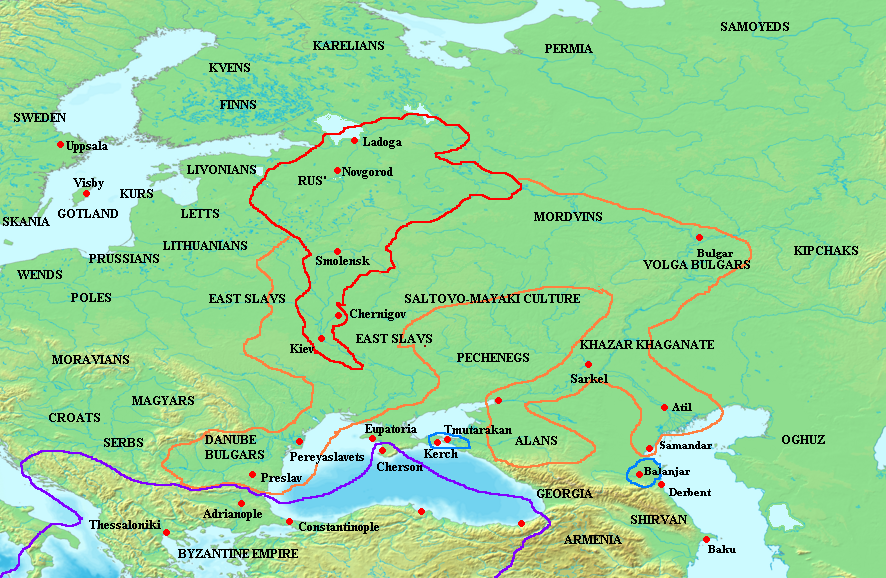
The Kievan Rus' at the beginning of Sviatoslav's reign (in red), showing his sphere of influence to 972 (in orange)

Sviatoslav began by rallying the East Slavic vassal tribes of the Khazars to his cause. Those who would not join him, such as the Vyatichs, were attacked and forced to pay tribute to the Kievan Rus' rather than to the Khazars. According to a legend recorded in the Primary Chronicle, Sviatoslav sent a message to the Vyatich rulers, consisting of a single phrase: "I want to come at you!" (Old East Slavic khochiu na vy iti) This phrase is used in modern Russian and Ukrainian (usually misquoted as idu na vy) to denote an unequivocal declaration of one's intentions. Proceeding by the Oka and Volga rivers, he attacked Volga Bulgaria. He employed Oghuz and Pecheneg mercenaries in this campaign, perhaps to counter the superior cavalry of the Khazars and Bulgars.

Sviatoslav destroyed the Khazar city of Sarkel around 965, possibly sacking (but not occupying) the Khazar city of Kerch on the Crimea as well. At Sarkel he established a Rus' settlement called Belaya Vyezha ("the white tower" or "the white fortress", the East Slavic translation for "Sarkel"). He subsequently destroyed the Khazar capital of Atil. A visitor to Atil wrote soon after Sviatoslav's campaign: "The Rus' attacked, and no grape or raisin remained, not a leaf on a branch." The exact chronology of his Khazar campaign is uncertain and disputed; for example, Mikhail Artamonov and David Christian proposed that the sack of Sarkel came after the destruction of Atil.

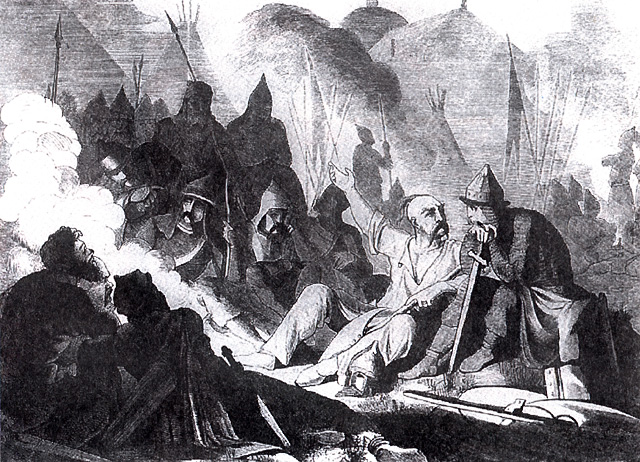
Sviatoslav's Council of War by Boris Chorikov

Although Ibn Haukal reports the sack of Samandar by Sviatoslav, the Rus' leader did not bother to occupy the Khazar heartlands north of the Caucasus Mountains permanently. On his way back to Kiev, Sviatoslav chose to strike against the Ossetians and force them into subservience. Therefore, Khazar successor statelets continued their precarious existence in the region. The destruction of Khazar imperial power paved the way for Kievan Rus' to dominate north–south trade routes through the steppe and across the Black Sea, routes that formerly had been a major source of revenue for the Khazars. Moreover, Sviatoslav's campaigns led to increased Slavic settlement in the region of the Saltovo-Mayaki culture, greatly changing the demographics and culture of the transitional area between the forest and the steppe.

== Campaigns in the Balkans ==
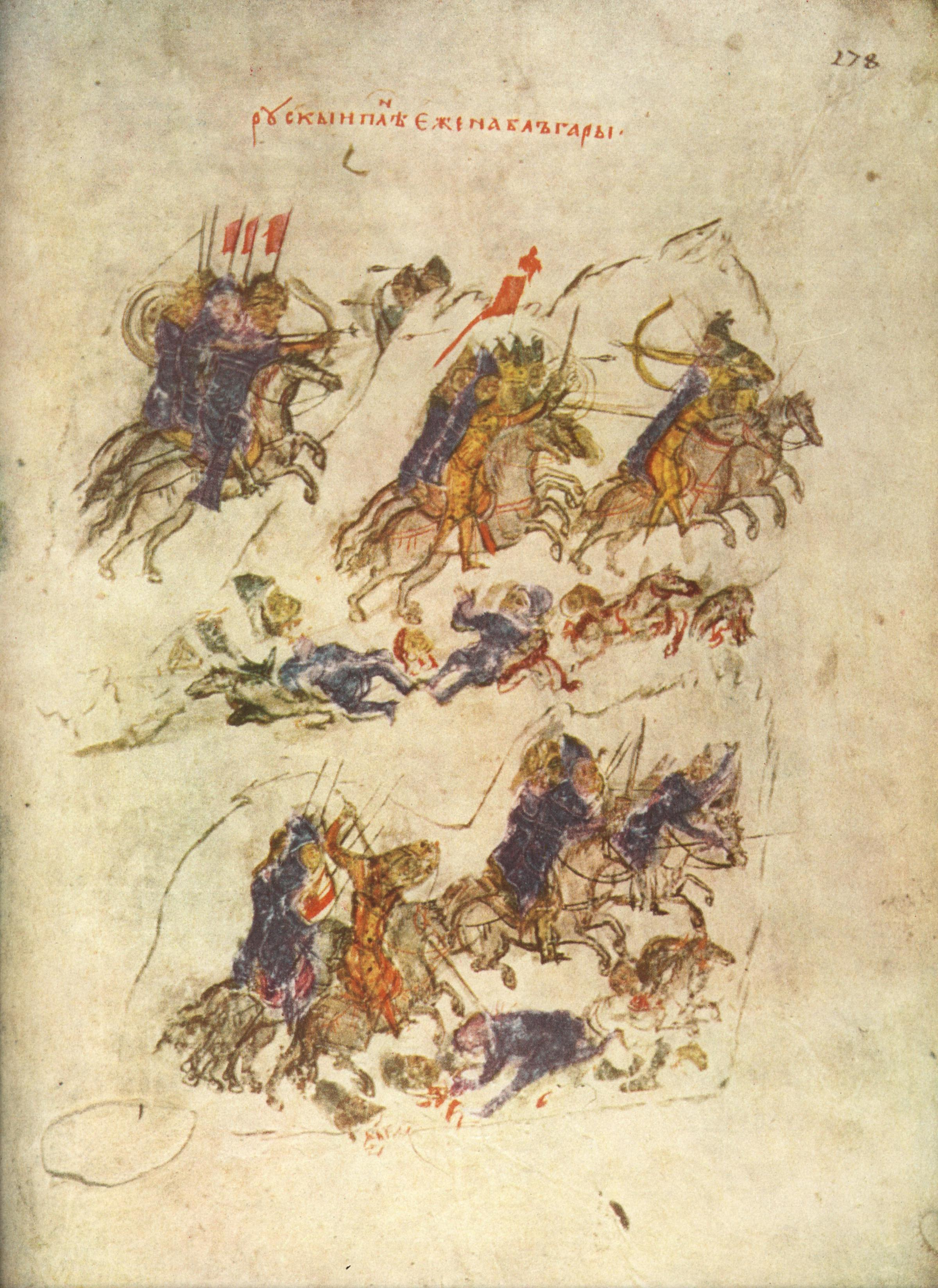
Sviatoslav invading Bulgaria, Manasses Chronicle

The annihilation of Khazaria was undertaken against the background of the Rus'-Byzantine alliance, concluded in the wake of Igor's Byzantine campaign in 944. Close military ties between the Rus' and Byzantium are illustrated by the fact, reported by John Skylitzes, that a Rus' detachment accompanied Byzantine Emperor Nikephoros Phokas in his victorious naval expedition to Crete.

In 967 or 968, Nikephoros sent his agent, Kalokyros, to persuade Sviatoslav to assist the Byzantines in a war against Bulgaria. Sviatoslav was paid 15,000 pounds of gold and set sail with an army of 60,000 men, including thousands of Pecheneg mercenaries.

Sviatoslav defeated the Bulgarian ruler Boris II and proceeded to occupy the whole of northern Bulgaria. Meanwhile, the Byzantines bribed the Pechenegs to attack and besiege Kiev, where Olga stayed with Sviatoslav's son Vladimir. The siege was relieved by the druzhina of Pretich, and immediately following the Pecheneg retreat, Olga sent a reproachful letter to Sviatoslav. He promptly returned and defeated the Pechenegs, who continued to threaten Kiev.

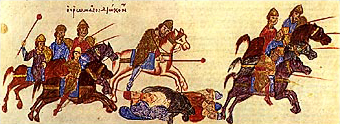
Pursuit of Sviatoslav's warriors by the Byzantine army, a miniature from 11th century chronicles of John Skylitzes.

Sviatoslav refused to turn his Balkan conquests over to the Byzantines, and the parties fell out as a result. To the chagrin of his boyars and his mother (who died within three days after learning about his decision), Sviatoslav decided to move his capital to Pereyaslavets in the mouth of the Danube due to the great potential of that location as a commercial hub. In the Primary Chronicle record for 969, Sviatoslav explains that it is to Pereyaslavets, the centre of his lands, that "all the riches flow: gold, silks, wine, and various fruits from Greece, silver and horses from Hungary and Bohemia, and from Rus' furs, wax, honey, and slaves".

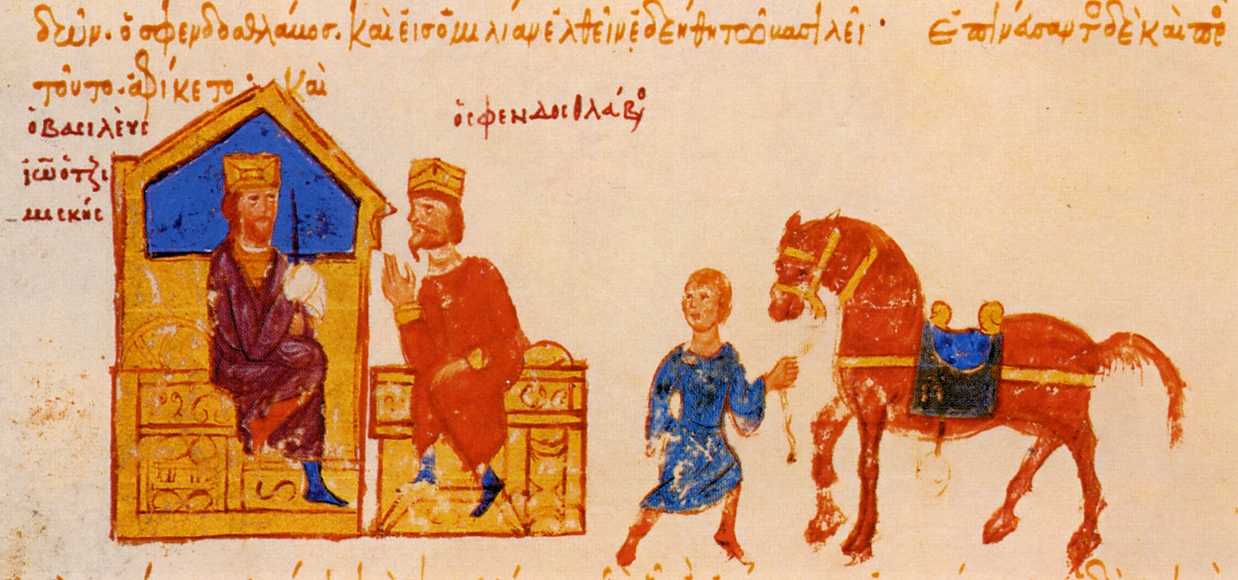
Madrid Skylitzes, meeting between John Tzimiskes and Sviatoslav.

In summer 969, Sviatoslav left Rus' again, dividing his dominion into three parts, each under a nominal rule of one of his sons. At the head of an army that included Pecheneg and Magyar auxiliary troops, he invaded Bulgaria again, devastating Thrace, capturing the city of Philippopolis, and massacring its inhabitants. Nikephoros responded by repairing the defences of Constantinople and raising new squadrons of armoured cavalry. In the midst of his preparations, Nikephoros was overthrown and killed by John Tzimiskes, who thus became the new Byzantine emperor.

John Tzimiskes first attempted to persuade Sviatoslav to leave Bulgaria, but he was unsuccessful. Challenging Byzantine authority, Sviatoslav crossed the Danube and laid siege to Adrianople, causing panic in the streets of Constantinople in summer 970. Later that year, the Byzantines launched a counteroffensive. Being occupied with suppressing a revolt brought by Bardas Phokas in Asia Minor, John Tzimiskes sent his commander-in-chief, Bardas Skleros, who defeated the coalition of Rus', Pechenegs, Magyars, and Bulgarians in the Battle of Arcadiopolis. Meanwhile, John, having quelled the revolt of Bardas Phokas, came to the Balkans with a large army and promoting himself as the liberator of Bulgaria from Sviatoslav, penetrated the impracticable mountain passes and shortly thereafter captured Marcianopolis, where the Rus' were holding a number of Bulgarian princes hostage.

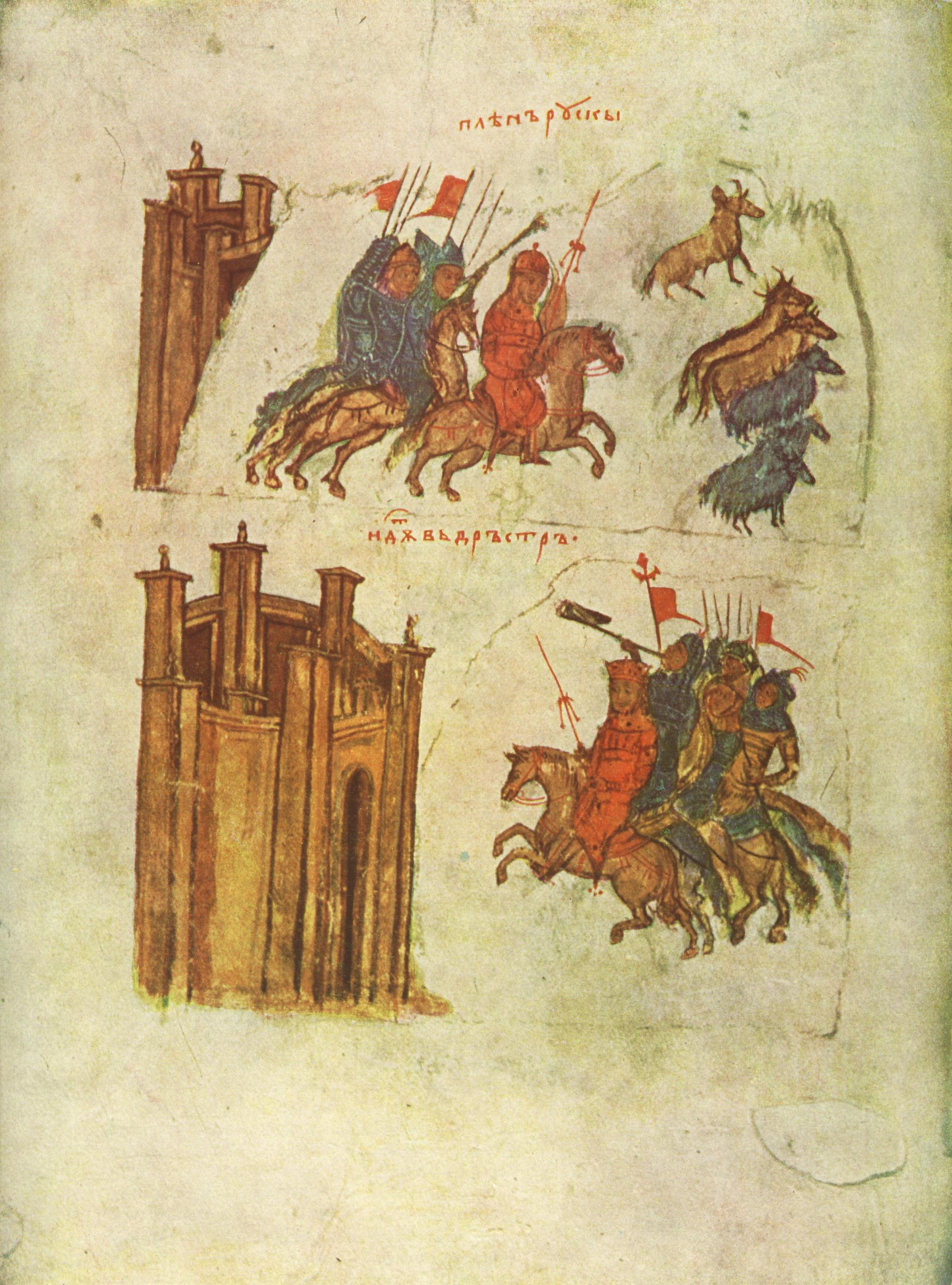
Siege of Durostorum in Manasses Chronicle

Sviatoslav retreated to Dorostolon, which the Byzantine armies besieged for sixty-five days. Cut off and surrounded, Sviatoslav came to terms with John and agreed to abandon the Balkans, renounce his claims to the southern Crimea, and return west of the Dnieper River. In return, the Byzantine emperor supplied the Rus' with food and safe passage home. Sviatoslav and his men set sail and landed on Berezan Island at the mouth of the Dnieper, where they made camp for the winter. Several months later, according to the Primary Chronicle, their camp was devastated by famine, so that even a horse's head could not be bought for less than a half-grivna. While Sviatoslav's campaign brought no tangible results for the Rus', it weakened the First Bulgarian Empire and left it vulnerable to the attacks of Basil the Bulgar-Slayer four decades later.

== Death and aftermath ==
Fearing that the peace with Sviatoslav would not endure, the Byzantine emperor induced the Pecheneg khan Kurya to kill Sviatoslav before he reached Kiev. This was in line with the policy outlined by Constantine VII Porphyrogenitus in De Administrando Imperio of fomenting strife between the Rus' and the Pechenegs. According to the Slavic chronicle, Sveneld attempted to warn Sviatoslav to avoid the Dnieper rapids, but the prince slighted his wise advice and was ambushed and slain by the Pechenegs when he tried to cross the cataracts near Khortytsia early in 972. The Primary Chronicle reports that his skull was made into a chalice by the Pecheneg khan.

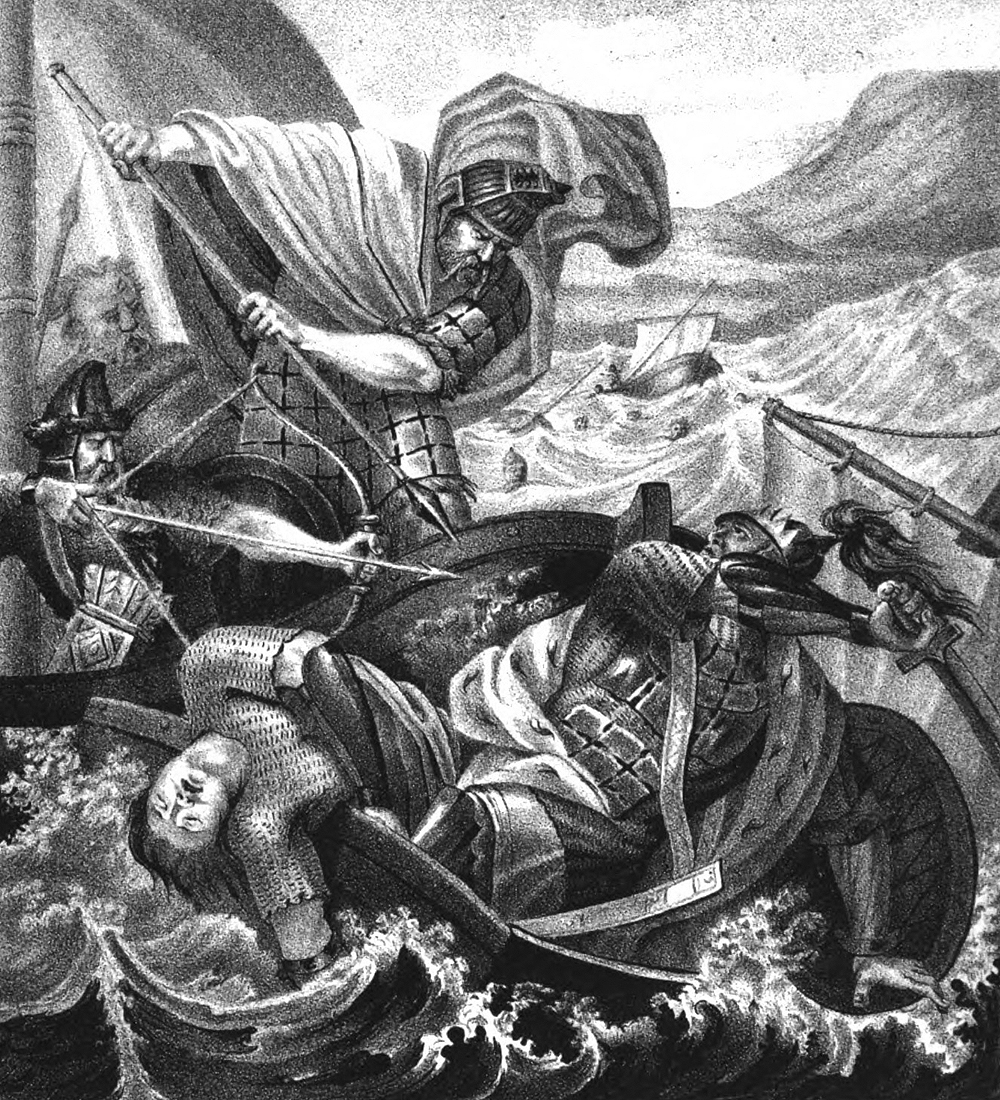
The Death of Sviatoslav by Boris Chorikov

Following Sviatoslav's death, tensions among his sons grew. A war broke out between his legitimate sons, Oleg and Yaropolk, in 976, at the conclusion of which Oleg was killed. In 977, Vladimir fled abroad to escape Oleg's fate where he raised an army of Varangians and returned in 978. Yaropolk was killed, and Vladimir became the sole ruler of Kievan Rus'.

== Art and literature ==
Sviatoslav has long been a hero of Belarusian, Russian, and Ukrainian patriots due to his great military successes. His figure first attracted attention of Russian artists and poets during the Russo-Turkish War (1768–1774), which provided obvious parallels with Sviatoslav's push towards Constantinople. Russia's southward expansion and the imperialistic ventures of Catherine II in the Balkans seemed to have been legitimised by Sviatoslav's campaigns eight centuries earlier.

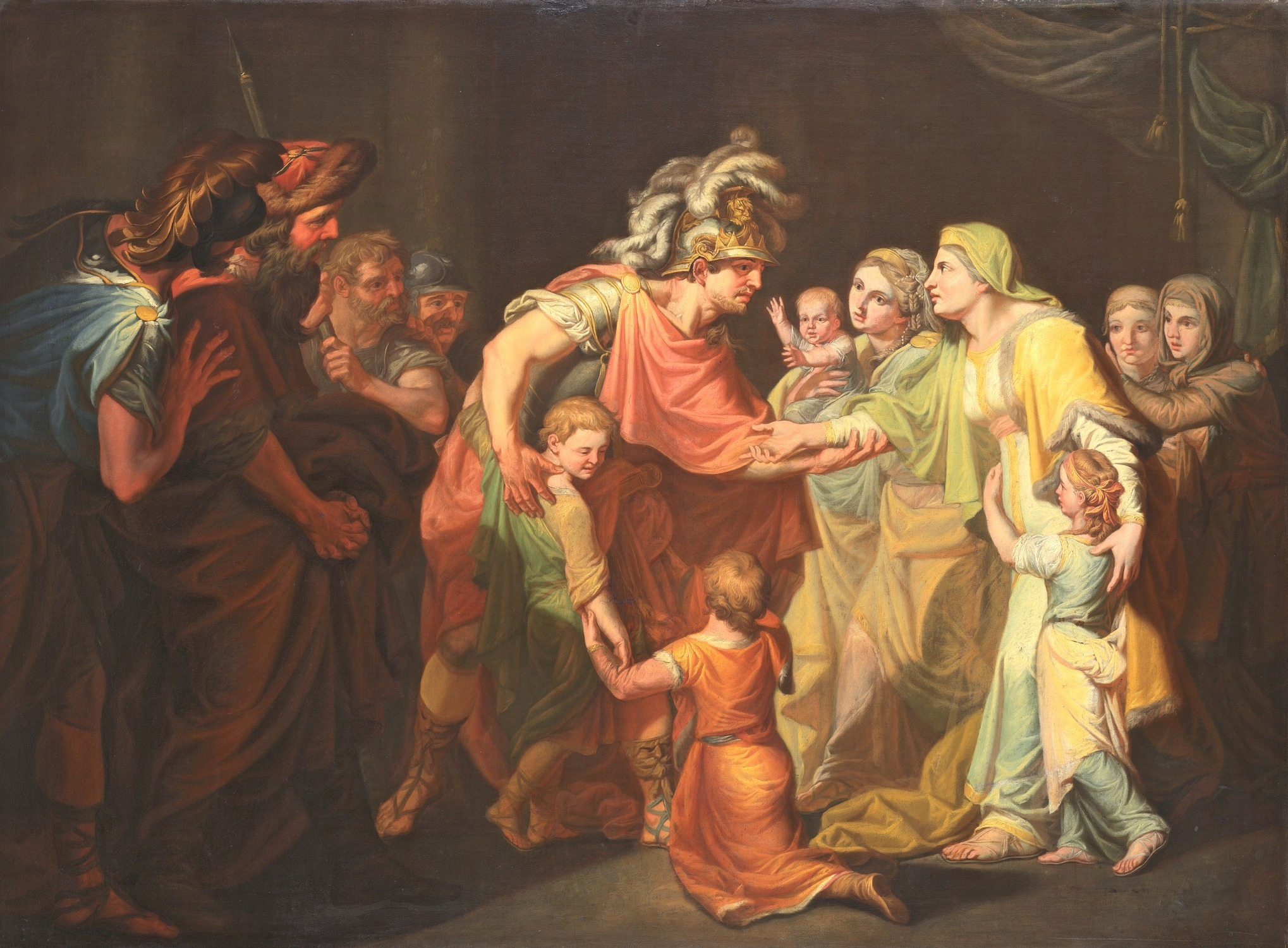
Ivan Akimov. Sviatoslav's Return from the Danube to His Family in Kiev (1773)

Among the works created during the war was Yakov Knyazhnin's tragedy Olga (1772). The Russian playwright chose to introduce Sviatoslav as his protagonist, although his active participation in the events following Igor's death is out of sync with the traditional chronology. Knyazhnin's rival Nikolai Nikolev (1758–1815) also wrote a play on the subject of Sviatoslav's life. Ivan Akimov's painting Sviatoslav's Return from the Danube to Kiev (1773) explores the conflict between military honour and family attachment. It is a vivid example of Poussinesque rendering of early medieval subject matter.

Interest in Sviatoslav's career increased in the 19th century. Klavdiy Lebedev depicted an episode of Sviatoslav's meeting with Emperor John in his well-known painting, while Eugene Lanceray sculpted an equestrian statue of Sviatoslav in the early 20th century. Sviatoslav appears in the 1913 poem of Velimir Khlebnikov Written before the war (#70. Написанное до войны) as an epitome of militant Slavdom:

Знаменитый сок Дуная,
Наливая в глубь главы,
Стану пить я, вспоминая
Светлых клич: "Иду на вы!".

Pouring the famed juice of the Danube
Into the depth of my head,
I shall drink and remember
The cry of the bright ones: "I come at you!"

Sviatoslav is the villain of the novel The Lost Kingdom, or the Passing of the Khazars, by Samuel Gordon, a fictionalised account of the destruction of Khazaria by the Rus'. The Slavic warrior figures in a more positive context in the story "Chernye Strely Vyaticha" by Vadim Viktorovich Kargalov; the story is included in his book Istoricheskie povesti.

In 2005, reports circulated that a village in the Belgorod region had erected a monument to Sviatoslav's victory over the Khazars by the Russian sculptor Vyacheslav Klykov. The reports described the 13-metre tall statue as depicting a Rus' cavalryman trampling a supine Khazar bearing a Star of David and Kolovrat. This created an outcry within the Jewish community of Russia. The controversy was further exacerbated by Klykov's connections with Pamyat and other anti-Semitic organisations, as well as by his involvement in the "letter of 500", a controversial appeal to the Prosecutor General to review all Jewish organisations in Russia for extremism. The Press Centre of the Belgorod Regional Administration responded by stating that a planned monument to Sviatoslav had not yet been constructed but would show "respect towards representatives of all nationalities and religions." When the statue was unveiled, the shield bore a twelve-pointed star.

Sviatoslav is the main character of the books Knyaz (Kniaz) and The Hero (Geroi), written by Russian writer Alexander Mazin. Sviatoslav plays a major role in the Soviet historical anthology film The Legend of Princess Olga, which tells the story of his mother, Olga. Sviatoslav appears in various segments, both as a child as an adult. The adult prince Sviatoslav is played by Les Serdyuk.

In November 2011, a Ukrainian fisherman found a one metre long sword in the waters of the Dnieper on Khortytsia, near where Sviatoslav is believed to have been killed in 972. The handle is made out of four different metals including gold and silver, and could possibly have belonged to Sviatoslav himself, but this is speculation—the sword could have belonged to any nobleman from that period.

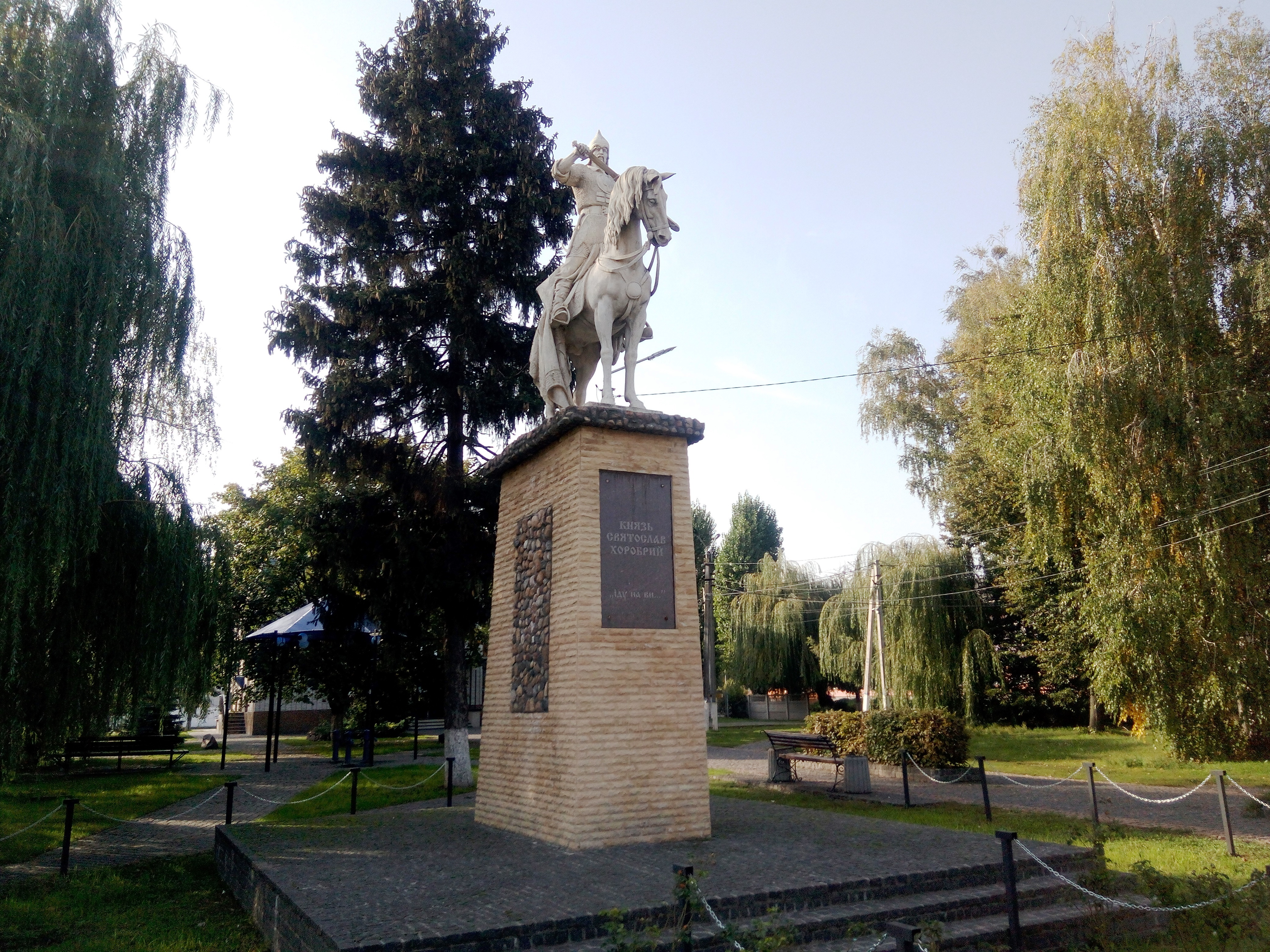
Monument to Svyatoslav the Brave in the village of Stari Petrivtsi, Kyiv region

== Bibliography ==
- Artamonov, Mikhail Istoriya Khazar. Leningrad, 1962.
- Barthold, W. "Khazar". Encyclopaedia of Islam (Brill Online). Eds.: P. Bearman, Th. Bianquis, C. E. Bosworth, E. van Donzel and W.P. Heinrichs. Brill, 1996.
- Chertkov A. D. Opisanie voin velikago kniazya Svyatoslava Igorevicha. Moscow, 1843.
- Chlenov, A. M. (А. М. Членов.) "K Voprosu ob Imeni Sviatoslava." Lichnye Imena v proshlom, Nastoyaschem i Buduschem Antroponomiki ("К вопросу об имени Святослава." Личные имена в прошлом, настоящем и будущем: проблемы антропонимики) (Moscow, 1970).
- Christian, David. A History of Russia, Mongolia and Central Asia. Blackwell, 1999.
- Cross, S. H., and O. P. Sherbowitz-Wetzor. The Russian Primary Chronicle: Laurentian Text. Cambridge, Mass.: Medieval Academy of America, 1953.
- Dunlop, D. M. History of the Jewish Khazars. Princeton Univ. Press, 1954.
- Franklin, Simon and Jonathan Shepard. The Emergence of Rus 750–1200. London: Longman, 1996. ISBN 0-582-49091-X.
- Golden, P. B. "Rus." Encyclopaedia of Islam (Brill Online). Eds.: P. Bearman, Th. Bianquis, C. E. Bosworth, E. van Donzel and W. P. Heinrichs. Brill, 2006.
- Grekov, Boris. Kiev Rus. tr. Sdobnikov, Y., ed. Ogden, Denis. Moscow: Foreign Languages Publishing House, 1959
- Hanak, Walter K. (1995), "The Infamous Svjatoslav: Master of Duplicity in War and Peace?", in Miller, Timothy S.; Nesbitt, John (eds.), Peace and War in Byzantium: Essays in Honor of George T. Dennis, S.J., The Catholic University of America Press, ISBN 978-0-8132-0805-3, archived from the original on 17 June 2010
- Kendrick, Thomas D. A History of the Vikings. Courier Dover Publications, 2004. ISBN 0-486-43396-X
- Logan, Donald F. The Vikings in History 2nd ed. Routledge, 1992. ISBN 0-415-08396-6
- Manteuffel Th. "Les tentatives d'entrainement de la Russie de Kiev dans la sphere d'influence latin". Acta Poloniae Historica. Warsaw, t. 22, 1970. ISSN 0001-6829
- Nazarenko, A. N. (А.Н. Назаренко). Drevniaya Rus' na Mezhdunarodnykh Putiakh (Древняя Русь на международных путях). Moscow, Russian Academy of Sciences, World History Institute, 2001. ISBN 5-7859-0085-8.
- Pletneva, Svetlana. Polovtsy Moscow: Nauka, 1990. ISBN 5-02-009542-7.
- Sakharov, Andrey. The Diplomacy of Svyatoslav. Moscow: Nauka, 1982. (online)
- Subtelny, Orest. Ukraine: A History. Toronto: University of Toronto Press, 1988. ISBN 0-8020-5808-6
- Vernadsky, G. V. The Origins of Russia. Oxford: Clarendon Press, 1959.
- Borrero, Mauricio (2009). Russia: A Reference Guide from the Renaissance to the Present. Infobase Publishing. ISBN 978-0-8160-7475-4.
- Gleason, Abbott (28 January 2014). A Companion to Russian History. John Wiley & Sons. ISBN 978-1-118-73000-3.
- Gasparov, Boris; Raevsky-Hughes, Olga (10 July 2018). Christianity and the Eastern Slavs, Volume I: Slavic Cultures in the Middle Ages. Univ of California Press. ISBN 978-0-520-30247-1.
- Martin, Janet (6 December 2007). Medieval Russia, 980–1584. Cambridge University Press. ISBN 978-0-521-85916-5.
- Bushkovitch, Paul (5 December 2011). A Concise History of Russia. Cambridge University Press. ISBN 978-1-139-50444-7.
- Feldbrugge, Ferdinand J. M. (20 October 2017). A History of Russian Law: From Ancient Times to the Council Code (Ulozhenie) of Tsar Aleksei Mikhailovich of 1649. BRILL. ISBN 978-90-04-35214-8.
- Franklin, Simon; Shepard, Jonathan (6 June 2014). The Emergence of Russia 750-1200. Routledge. ISBN 978-1-317-87224-5.
- Stephenson, Paul (2000). Byzantium's Balkan Frontier: A Political Study of the Northern Balkans, 900–1204. Cambridge University Press. ISBN 978-0-521-77017-0.
- Curta, Florin (8 July 2019). Eastern Europe in the Middle Ages (500–1300) (2 vols). BRILL. ISBN 978-90-04-39519-0.
- Hanak, Walter K. (10 October 2013). The Nature and the Image of Princely Power in Kievan Rus', 980–1054: A Study of Sources. BRILL. ISBN 978-90-04-26022-1.
- Basilevsky, Alexander (28 March 2016). Early Ukraine: A Military and Social History to the Mid-19th Century. McFarland. ISBN 978-0-7864-9714-0.

Sviatoslav I of Kiev Rurikovich Born: 942 Died: 972
Regnal titles
Preceded by Olga (regent)	Prince of Kiev; 960s–972	Succeeded by Yaropolk I Sviatoslavich
Titles in pretence
Preceded by Igor	Prince of Kiev; 945–960s	Succeeded by Yaropolk I
Preceded by Olga	Rulers of Kievan Rus'; 945–972	Succeeded by Yaropolk
