= Battle of Arcadiopolis (970) =

Battle fought in 970 between a Byzantine army under Bardas Skleros and a Rus' army,

Coordinates: 41°24′N 27°21′E

- Part of Sviatoslav's invasion of Bulgaria and the Hungarian invasions of Europe
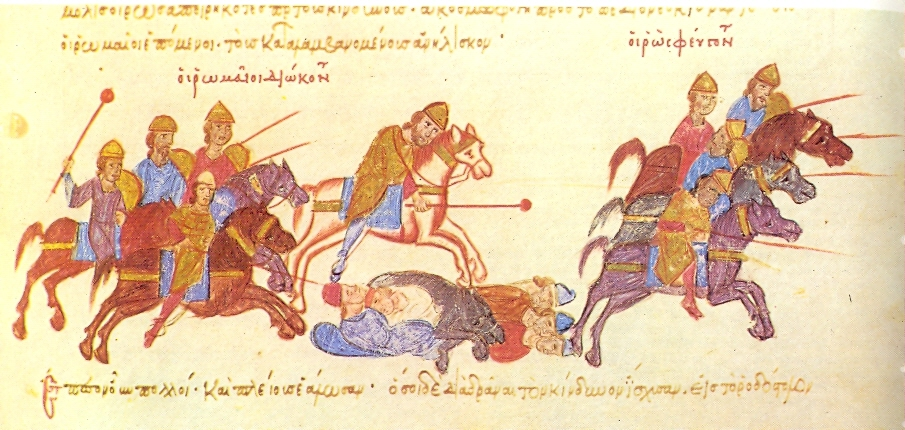
- The Byzantines pursue the fleeing Rus. Miniature from the Madrid Skylitzes.
Date	March 970
Location	Arcadiopolis (mod. Lüleburgaz, Turkey)
Result	Byzantine victory

Belligerents
Byzantine Empire	Kievan Rus'; Bulgarians; Magyars; Pechenegs

Commanders and leaders
Bardas Skleros; Peter	Unknown

Strength
10,000–12,000	10,000–30,000

Casualties and losses
20–55 or heavy	Heavy

The Battle of Arcadiopolis was fought in 970 between a Byzantine army under Bardas Skleros and a Rus' army, the latter also including allied Bulgarian, Pecheneg, and Hungarian (Magyar) contingents. In the preceding years, the Rus' ruler Sviatoslav had conquered northern Bulgaria, and was now menacing Byzantium as well. The Rus' force had been advancing through Thrace towards Constantinople when it was met by Skleros' force. Having fewer men than the Rus', Skleros prepared an ambush and attacked the Rus' army with a portion of his force. The Byzantines then feigned retreat, and succeeded in drawing off the Pecheneg contingent into the ambush, routing it. The remainder of the Rus' army then suffered heavy casualties from the pursuing Byzantines. The battle was important as it bought time for the Byzantine emperor John I Tzimiskes to settle his internal problems and assemble a large expedition, which eventually defeated Sviatoslav the next year.

== Background ==
In 965 or 966, a Bulgarian emissary visited the Byzantine emperor Nikephoros II Phokas (r. 963–969) at Constantinople to receive the annual tribute that had been agreed by the two powers as the price of peace in 927. Phokas, flush and self-confident from a series of victories against the Arabs in the East that had led to the recovery of Crete, Cyprus, and Cilicia, refused to comply, and even had the envoys beaten up. He followed this up with a show of military strength, by sending a small force to raze a number of Bulgarian border posts in Thrace.

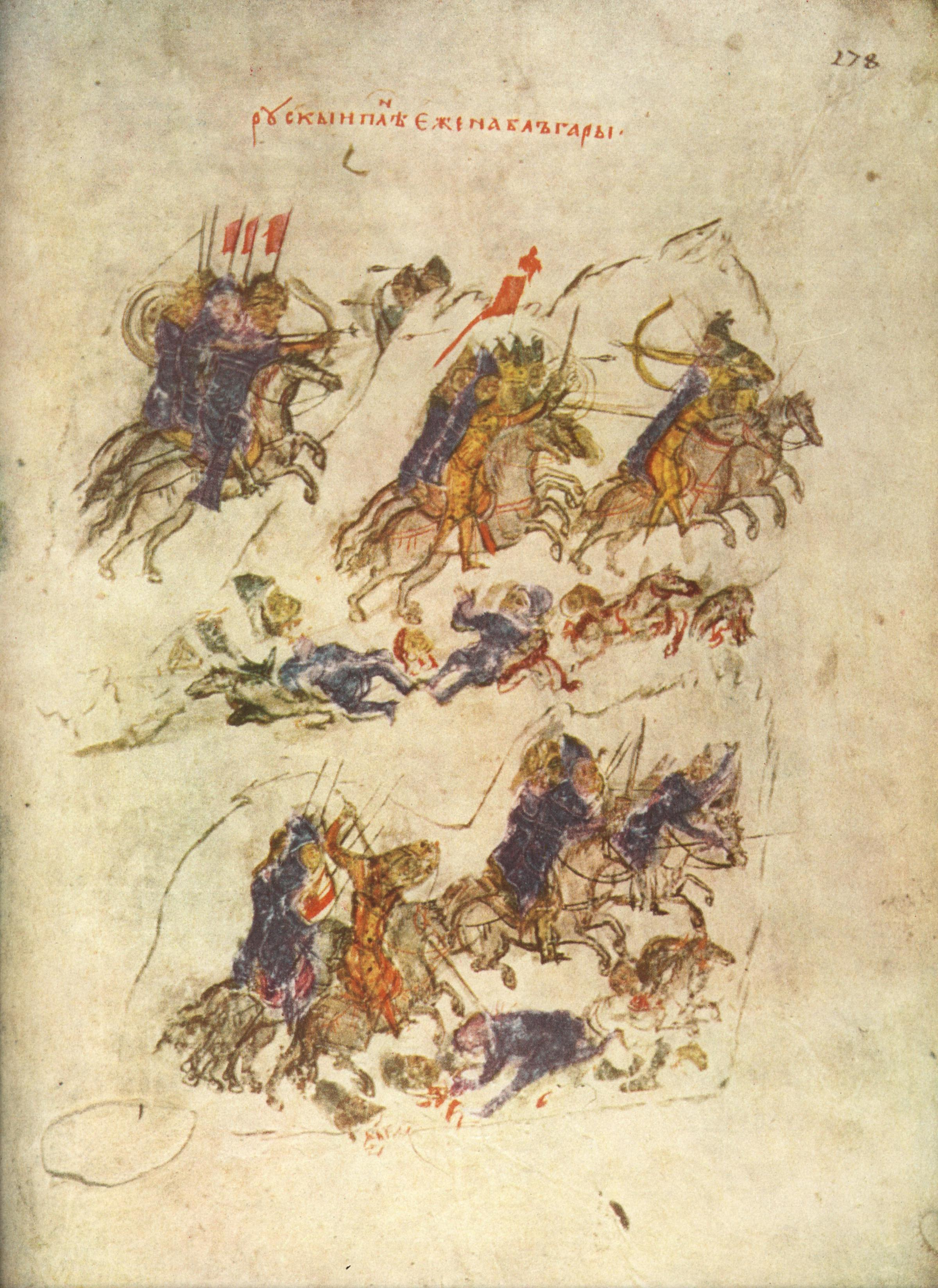
Sviatoslav invading Bulgaria. Miniature from the Manasses Chronicle.

It was a clear declaration of war, but Nikephoros' forces were largely preoccupied in the East. Thus the emperor turned to the traditional Byzantine expedient of turning one of the peoples living further north, in modern-day Ukraine, against Bulgaria. He sent an ambassador, the patrikios Kalokyros, to Sviatoslav, ruler of the Rus' with whom the Byzantines had maintained close relations. Sviatoslav enthusiastically responded, and invaded Bulgaria in 967 or 968 in a devastating raid, before returning home to defend his capital against a Pecheneg attack. This forced the Bulgarian tsar, Peter I, to the negotiating table, agreeing to terms favourable to Byzantium. However, this brief sojourn also awakened in Sviatoslav the desire to conquer Bulgaria and establish his own realm there. He returned in force in July or August 969 and conquered the country within a few months.

Nikephoros' scheme had backfired dramatically: instead of peace, a new and formidable foe had appeared in the Balkans, and a large part of the Bulgarian nobility appeared to side with the Rus' prince. The emperor, however, was murdered in December 969, and it fell to his successor, John I Tzimiskes (r. 969–976), to deal with the Rus' threat. Sviatoslav now turned his sights on Byzantium, and to John's entreaties for peace he allegedly answered that the Empire should abandon its European territories to him and withdraw to Asia Minor. Tzimiskes himself was preoccupied with consolidating his position and with countering the unrest of the powerful Phokas clan and its adherents, and delegated the war in the Balkans to his brother-in-law, the Domestic of the Schools Bardas Skleros, and to the eunuch stratopedarches Peter. They were to winter in Thrace and raise an army, whilst sending spies to discover Sviatoslav's intentions.

At the news of this, a powerful Rus' force, along with many Bulgarians and a Pecheneg contingent, was sent south over the Balkan Mountains. After sacking the city of Philippopolis (modern Plovdiv) in Thrace, they bypassed the heavily defended city of Adrianople and turned towards Constantinople. The size of the Rus' army, and whether it comprised the entirety of Sviatoslav's forces or just a division, is unclear. John Skylitzes, for instance, implies that this was the entire Rus' army, numbering an incredible 308,000 men, but the contemporary Leo the Deacon reports that it was a detachment of "over 30,000 men"; conversely, the Russian Primary Chronicle gives the entire Rus' army under Sviatoslav at some 30,000, whilst numbering the Rus' at Arcadiopolis at only 10,000, faced with 100,000 Byzantines. It is clear, however, that the Byzantines were considerably outnumbered, and that the Rus' force at Arcadiopolis included significant numbers of Bulgarians, as well as allied contingents of Pechenegs and "Turks" (i.e. Magyars).

== Battle ==
Skleros then quickly assembled a force of ten to twelve thousand men and set out to meet the Rus'. The two armies met near Arcadiopolis (modern Lüleburgaz in Turkish Thrace), some 80 km west of Constantinople. The two primary accounts on the Byzantine side differ on the preliminaries of the battle: Leo the Deacon reports that Skleros sent a scouting detachment ahead under the patrikios John Alakaseus, and then gave battle after only a day, but the later chronicle of Skylitzes reports that for a few days, Skleros with his men remained within the walls of Arcadiopolis as the Rus' encamped nearby, and refused to come out and meet them in battle despite their repeated challenges for him to do so. According to Skylitzes, the Rus' quickly became convinced that the imperial army was too afraid to face them; consequently they roamed about the countryside plundering, neglected their camp defences, and spent their nights in heedless revelry.

Skleros eventually set out from the city, and divided his forces into three groups: two divisions were placed in ambush on the wooded sides of the road leading towards the Rus' camp, while another, probably some 2,000–3,000 men, was placed under himself (or Alakaseus in Skylitzes' account) and went forth to attack the Rus' host. The Byzantine detachment quickly came into contact with the Rus' army, and charged the Pecheneg contingent. The Byzantines executed a gradual orderly retreat, turning at intervals to charge back at the pursuing Pechenegs, who had thus become separated from the main body of the Rus' army. This conflict was fierce and bloody, taxing the discipline and endurance of the small Byzantine force. According to Leo the Deacon, at one point one of the Pechenegs charged Bardas himself and delivered a sword blow on his helmet, which was deflected by the metal without doing harm. Bardas' young brother Constantine came to his rescue, killing the Pecheneg.

When the two opposing forces reached the place of the ambush, Bardas ordered the trumpets blown and the two concealed Byzantine divisions attacked the Pechenegs from the flanks and the rear. Cut off from aid and surrounded, the Pechenegs began to panic and flee. One of their leaders tried to rally his men, but he was attacked by Bardas Skleros himself, who killed him with a single sword-blow that reportedly cut him in two from his head down to the waist, through the Pecheneg's helmet and cuirass. The loss of the Pecheneg commander turned the battle into a complete rout, and panic spread to the Bulgarian contingent following behind the Pechenegs, which also suffered heavy casualties in the general chaos. The Byzantine casualties in the battle were low (Skylitzes speaks of 25 dead and Leo of 55) although they lost many horses to the Pecheneg arrows, while the losses of the Rus' force, although certainly lower than Leo's claimed 20,000, were still significant, probably running into several thousands.

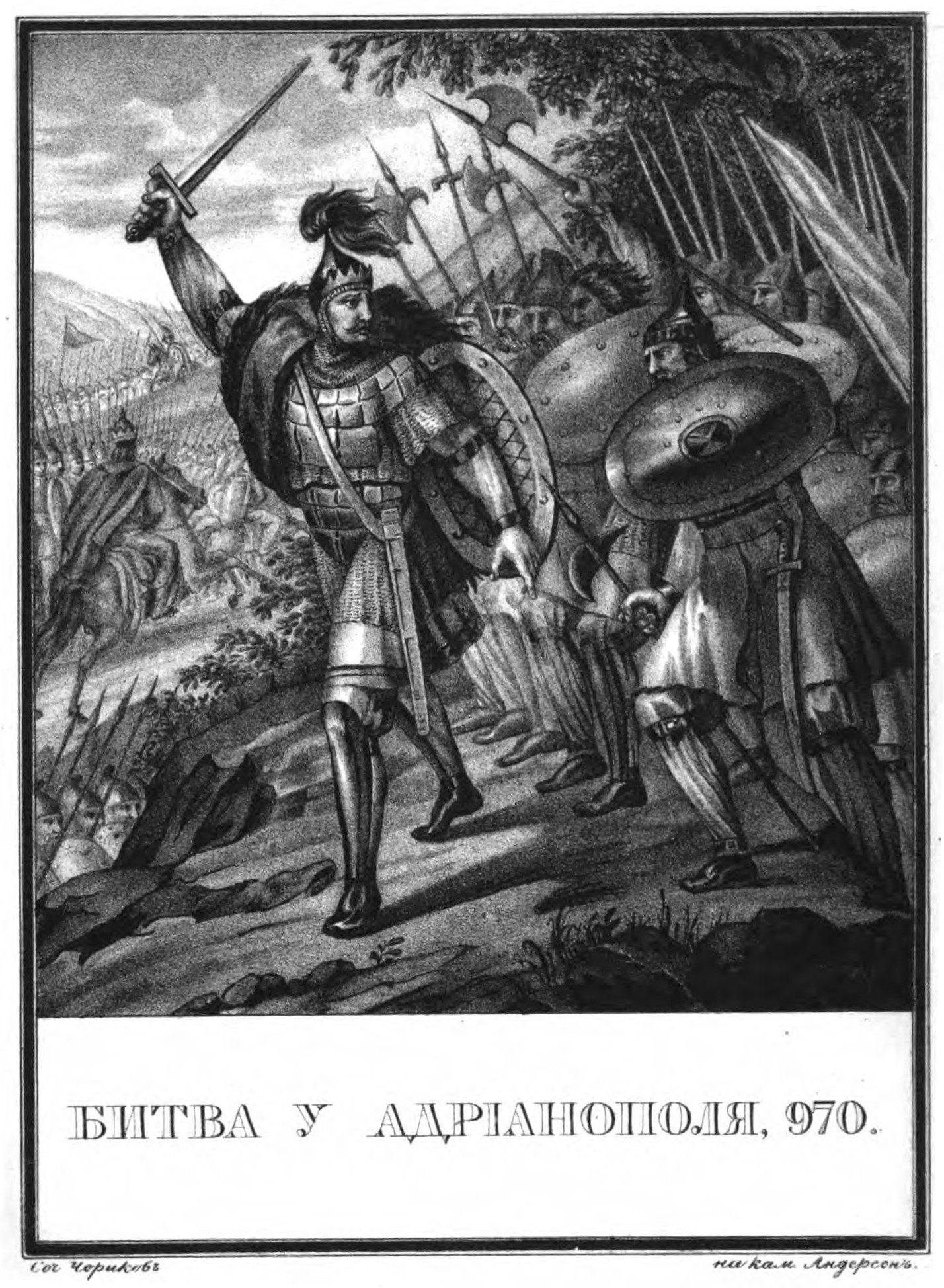
«Sviatoslav in the battle with the Greeks»

== Aftermath ==
The Byzantines were unable to exploit this victory or pursue the remnants of the Rus' army, since Bardas Phokas rose in revolt in Asia Minor. Bardas Skleros and his men were consequently withdrawn to Asia Minor, whilst Sviatoslav restricted his forces to the north of the Balkan Mountains. In the spring of the next year, however, with Phokas' rebellion subdued, Tzimiskes himself, at the head of his army, advanced north into Bulgaria. The Byzantines took the Bulgarian capital Preslav, capturing the Bulgarian tsar Boris II, and confined the Rus' in the fortress of Dorostolon (modern Silistra). After a three-month siege and a series of pitched battles before the city walls, Sviatoslav conceded defeat and abandoned Bulgaria.

In Hungarian historiography, the Battle of Arcadiopolis is considered as the final chapter of the Hungarian invasions of Europe, a series of plundering raids both westward and southward since the end of the 9th century. Following that the new Grand Prince, Géza consolidated his authority and also supported Christian missionaries from Western Europe (experiencing the fate of the Bulgarian patriarchate after John Tzimiskes's campaign against Bulgaria, when it lost its independence), which led to the Christianization of the Magyars and the establishment of the Christian Kingdom of Hungary by the beginning of the new millennium.

== Versions of what happened ==
According to the Primary Chronicle, Sviatoslav's army defeated the Greeks and began to ravage the whole of Thrace, and the outskirts of Constantinople. But the Greeks bought him off with a rich tribute. According to Byzantine sources, the Rus' suffered a crushing defeat and Sviatoslav later retreated to Bulgaria. Most scholars, including Russian scholars, have agreed with the version of the Byzantine primary sources. Byzantine sources also describe the events of the battle in more detail, which makes the scholars think that these sources are more authoritative. Russian historians Andrey Sakharov and Mikhaïl Suzumov believe that the battle described in the chronicle refers to another battle, where the main part of Sviatoslav's army was located.

== Sources ==
- Karamzin, Nikolay (2020) [1824]. История Государства Российского [History of the Russian state]. St.Petersburg: Азбука. ISBN 978-5-389-10418-1.
- Norwich, John (2023). The History of the Byzantine Empire: From the foundation of Constantinople to the collapse of the state. Moscow: КоЛибри. ISBN 978-5-389-19591-2.
- Berend, Nora; Laszlovszky, József; Szakács, Béla Zsolt (2007). "The kingdom of Hungary". In Berend, Nora (ed.). Christianization and the Rise of Christian Monarchy: Scandinavia, Central Europe and Rus', c. 900-1200. Cambridge University Press. pp. 319–368. ISBN 978-0-521-87616-2.
- Fine, John V. A. Jr. (1991) [1983]. The Early Medieval Balkans: A Critical Survey from the Sixth to the Late Twelfth Century. Ann Arbor: University of Michigan Press. ISBN 0-472-08149-7.
- Haldon, John F. (2001). The Byzantine Wars. Stroud, Gloucestershire: Tempus Publishing. ISBN 978-0-7524-1795-0.
- Hupchick, Dennis (2017). The Bulgarian-Byzantine Wars For Early Medieval Balkan Hegemony: Silver-Lined Skulls and Blinded Armies. Wilkes-Barre, USA: Palgrave Macmillan. ISBN 978-3-319-56205-6.
- Kazhdan, Alexander, ed. (1991). The Oxford Dictionary of Byzantium. Oxford and New York: Oxford University Press. ISBN 0-19-504652-8.
- Schlumberger, Gustave Léon (1925). L'épopée byzantine à la fin du dixième siècle: guerres contre les Russes, les Arabes, les Allemands, les Bulgares; luttes civiles contre les deux Bardas. Jean Tzimiscés. Les jeunes années de Basile II, le tueur de Bulgares (969-989). Paris: E. De Boccard.
- Shikanov, Vladimir (2010). Византия. Из варяг в греки. Русско-византийские войны IX — XII вв. [Byzantium. From the Varangians to the Greeks. Russo-Byzantine Wars of the 9th - 12th Centuries] (in Russian). ISBN 5-8067-0053-4.
- Stephenson, Paul (2000). Byzantium's Balkan Frontier: A Political Study of the Northern Balkans, 900–1204. Cambridge: Cambridge University Press. ISBN 0-521-77017-3.
- Talbot, Alice-Mary; Sullivan, Denis F. (2005). The History of Leo the Deacon: Byzantine Military Expansion in the Tenth Century. Washington, District of Columbia: Dumbarton Oaks. ISBN 978-0-88402-324-1.
- Егоршина, Петрова (2023). История русской армии [The history of the Russian Army] (in Russian). Moscow: Edition of the Russian Imperial Library. ISBN 978-5-699-42397-2.
- Treadgold, Warren (1997). A History of the Byzantine State and Society. Stanford, California: Stanford University Press. ISBN 0-8047-2630-2.
- Whittow, Mark (1996). The Making of Byzantium, 600–1025. Berkeley and Los Angeles, California: University of California Press. ISBN 978-0-520-20496-6.
