= Kalokyros =

Kalokyros (Greek: Καλοκυρός, died 971) was a pretender to the Byzantine throne during the Rus'–Byzantine War (970–971) in the reigns of Nikephoros II and John I Tzimiskes.

According to the historians John Skylitzes and Leo the Deacon, Kalokyros was the son of a strategos of Chersonesos. In 967 or 968, Nikephoros II bestowed upon him the title of patrikios and dispatched him to the court of Sviatoslav I of Kiev in order to persuade him to launch an invasion of the First Bulgarian Empire, with which Byzantium was at war. Kalokyros was to pay Sviatoslav 15,000 pounds of gold to defray the expense of the voyage.

The Greek historians also allege that Sviatoslav agreed to support Kalokyros in his ambition of gaining the imperial throne, while Kalokyros promised to reward Sviatoslav with "great, incalculable treasures from the imperial coffers" and to acknowledge his conquest of Bulgaria. During the following Rus'–Byzantine conflict, Kalokyros (whom Sviatoslav reportedly loved and respected as his own brother) was captured by the Byzantines at Preslav and put to death.

The Rus' mission of Kalokyros may be the subject of an obscure record inscribed on the blank pages of a 10th-century Byzantine codex. In this document, a Greek toparch recounts his passage through the hostile country north of the Black Sea sometime between 964 and 967. A. N. Sakharov believes that the document describes Kalokyros's return from Kiev through Berezan Island to Crimea, although the accuracy of this interpretation is open to question.
