= Siege of Kiev (968) =

968 siege by the Pechenegs against the Kyivan Rus

Coordinates: 50°27′00″N 30°31′25″E

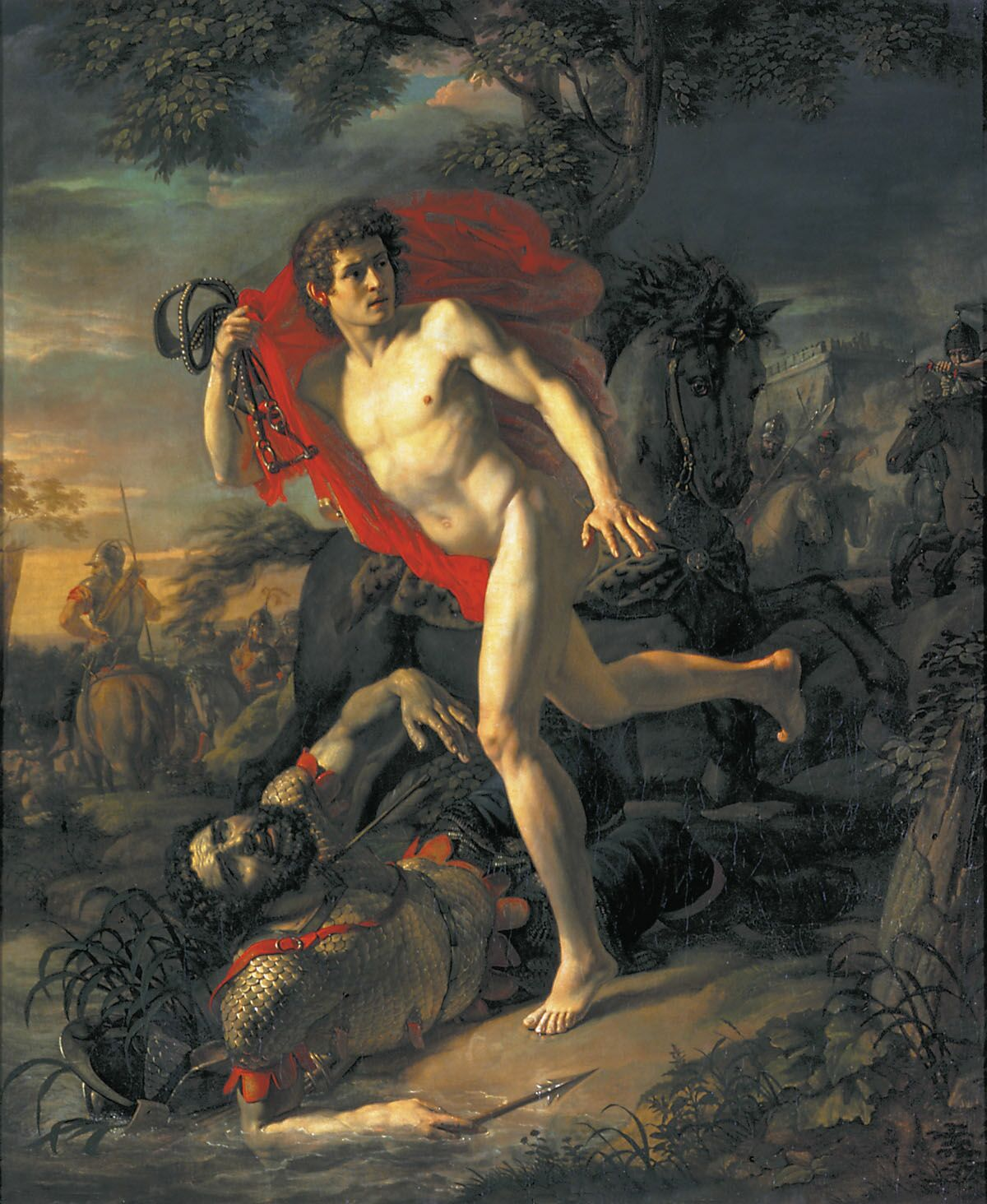
- Andrey Ivanovich Ivanov, The Exploit of a Kievan Boy (1810) – Russian Museum
Date	968 CE
Location	Kiev, Kievan Rus' (present-day Kyiv, Ukraine)
Result	Kievan Rus' victory

Belligerents
Pecheneg Khanate	Kievan Rus'

Commanders and leaders
Unknown	Sviatoslav I Pretich

The siege of Kiev by the Pechenegs in 968 (sub anno 6476) is narrated in pages 65.19–67.20 of the Primary Chronicle. It is an account that freely mixes historical details with folklore.

Sviatoslav ultimately repelled the Pecheneg invasion and the Siege was a failure for the Pechenegs.

== Narrative ==
According to the chronicle, while Sviatoslav I was pursuing his campaign against the First Bulgarian Empire, the Pechenegs (in all probability, bribed by Byzantine Emperor Nicephorus Phocas) invaded Rus and besieged his capital of Kiev (Kyiv). While the besieged suffered from hunger and thirst, Sviatoslav's general Pretich deployed his druzhina, his personal guard, on the opposite (left) bank of the Dnieper, not daring to cross the river against the larger Pecheneg force.

Reduced to extremes, Sviatoslav's mother Olga of Kiev (who was in Kiev together with all of Sviatoslav's sons) contemplated surrender if Pretich did not relieve the siege within one day. She was anxious to send word about her plans to Pretich. At last a boy fluent in the Pecheneg language volunteered to venture from the city and urge Pretich to action. Pretending to be a Pecheneg, he went about their camp, as if searching for a lost horse. When he attempted to swim across the Dnieper, the Pechenegs discovered his subterfuge and started shooting at him, but to no avail.

When the boy reached the opposite bank and informed Pretich about the desperate condition of the Kievans, the general decided to make a sally in order to evacuate Sviatoslav's family from the city, for fear of his sovereign's anger. Early in the morning Pretich and his troops embarked on boats across the Dnieper, making great noise with their trumpets. The besieged started cheering and Olga ventured out of the city towards the river. The Pechenegs, thinking that Sviatoslav was returning with his great army, lifted the siege.

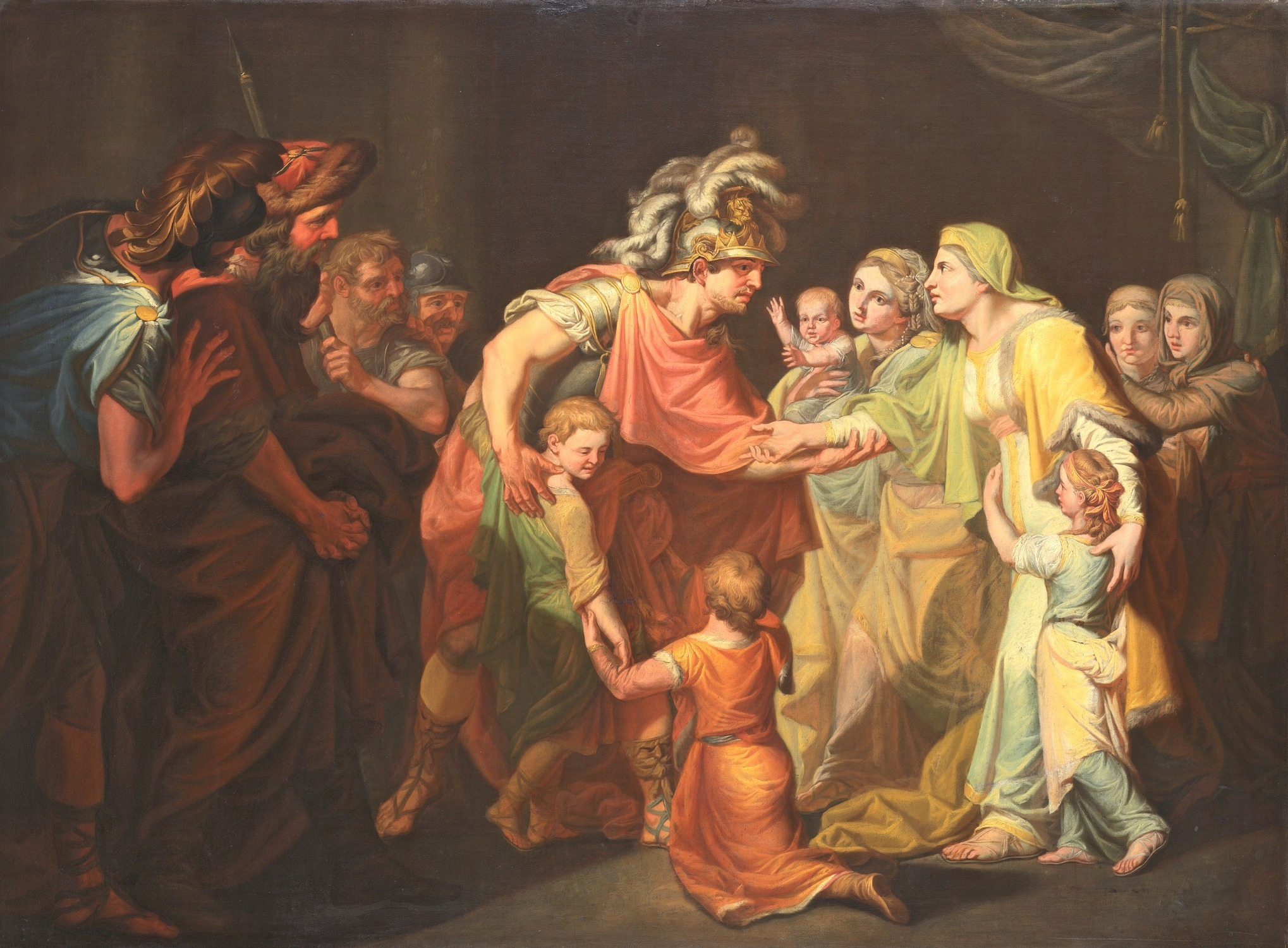
Ivan Akimov, Sviatoslav's return from the Danube to his family in Kiev (1773). Tretyakov Gallery.

The Pecheneg leader then decided to confer with Pretich and asked him whether he was Sviatoslav. Pretich admitted that he was only a general but warned the Pecheneg ruler that his unit was a vanguard of Sviatoslav's approaching army. As a sign of his peaceful disposition, the Pecheneg ruler shook hands with Pretich and exchanged his own horse, sword and arrows for Pretich's armor.

As soon as the Pechenegs retreated, Olga sent a letter to Sviatoslav reproaching him for his neglect of his family and people. Upon receiving the message, Sviatoslav speedily returned to Kiev and thoroughly defeated the Pechenegs, who were still threatening the city from the south. The following year Olga died and Sviatoslav established a base in Pereyaslavets on the Danube (Romania) around 969 after conquering the city. He intended to move the capital of his realm there because he considered it a more strategic location due to its proximity to trade routes.

== Bibliography ==
=== Primary sources ===
- Cross, Samuel Hazzard; Sherbowitz-Wetzor, Olgerd P. (1953). The Russian Primary Chronicle, Laurentian Text. Translated and edited by Samuel Hazzard Cross and Olgerd P. Sherbowitz-Wetzor (PDF). Cambridge, Massachusetts: The Mediaeval Academy of America. p. 325. (First edition published in 1930. The first 50 pages are a scholarly introduction.)
- Thuis, Hans (2015). Nestorkroniek. De oudste geschiedenis van het Kievse Rijk (in Dutch). Nijmegen: Uitgeverij Vantilt. p. 304. ISBN 9789460042287.

=== Scholarly literature ===
- Martin, Janet (2007). Medieval Russia: 980–1584. Second Edition. E-book. Cambridge: Cambridge University Press. ISBN 978-0-511-36800-4.
- Vasily Vasilievsky. Byzantium and the Pechenegs. St. Petersburg, 1872.
