= Sviatoslav's invasion of Bulgaria =

Conflict between the Kievan Rus' and the First Bulgarian Empire from 967/968 to 971

- Part of the Rus'–Byzantine Wars and Byzantine–Bulgarian wars
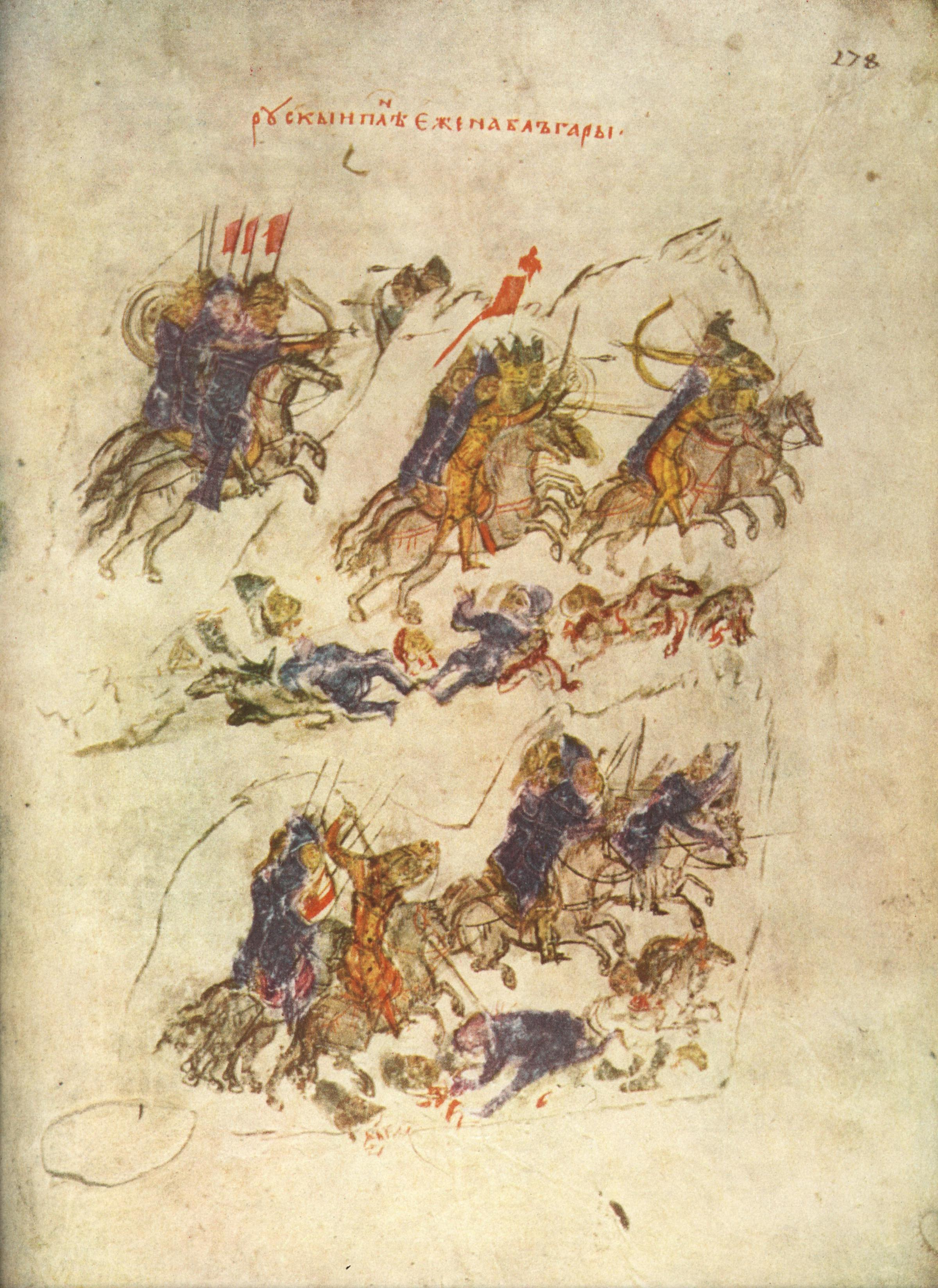
- Sviatoslav's invasion, from the Manasses Chronicle.
Date	967/968–971
Location	Moesia and Thrace
Result	Byzantine victory

Belligerents
Kievan Rus', Pechenegs, Magyars	Bulgaria; Pechenegs	Byzantine Empire

Commanders and leaders
Sviatoslav I of Kiev † (Note: He was killed while returning from a campaign); Sphangel †(?); Ikmor †	Peter I of Bulgaria; Boris II of Bulgaria	John I Tzimiskes; Bardas Skleros

Strength
60,000+ men	~30,000 men	~30,000–40,000 men

Sviatoslav's invasion of Bulgaria was a conflict beginning in 967/968 and ending in 971, carried out in the eastern Balkans, and involving the Kievan Rus', Bulgaria, and the Byzantine Empire. The Byzantines encouraged the Rus' ruler Sviatoslav to attack Bulgaria, leading to the defeat of the Bulgarian forces and the occupation of the northern and north-eastern part of the country by the Rus' for the following two years. The allies then turned against each other, and the ensuing military confrontation ended with a Byzantine victory. The Rus' withdrew and eastern Bulgaria was incorporated into the Byzantine Empire.

In 927, a peace treaty had been signed between Bulgaria and Byzantium, ending many years of warfare and establishing forty years of peace. Both states prospered during this interlude, but the balance of power gradually shifted in favour of the Byzantines, who made great territorial gains against the Abbasid Caliphate in the east and formed a web of alliances surrounding Bulgaria. By 965/966, the warlike new Byzantine emperor Nikephoros II Phokas refused to renew the annual tribute that was part of the peace agreement and declared war on Bulgaria. Preoccupied with his campaigns in the East, Nikephoros resolved to fight the war by proxy and invited the Rus' ruler Sviatoslav to invade Bulgaria.

Sviatoslav's subsequent campaign greatly exceeded the expectations of the Byzantines, who had regarded him only as a means to exert diplomatic pressure on the Bulgarians. The Rus' prince conquered the core regions of the Bulgarian state in the northeastern Balkans in 967–969, seized the Bulgarian tsar Boris II, and effectively ruled the country through him. Sviatoslav intended to continue his drive south against Byzantium itself, which regarded the establishment of a new and powerful Russo-Bulgarian state in the Balkans with great concern. After stopping a Rus' advance through Thrace at the Battle of Arcadiopolis in 970, the Byzantine emperor John I Tzimiskes led an army north into Bulgaria in 971 and captured Preslav, the capital. After a three-month siege of the fortress of Dorostolon, Sviatoslav agreed to terms with the Byzantines and withdrew from Bulgaria. Tzimiskes formally annexed Eastern Bulgaria to the Byzantine Empire. However, most of the country in the central and western Balkans remained in effect outside imperial control; this would lead to the revival of the Bulgarian state in these regions under the Cometopuli dynasty.

== Background ==
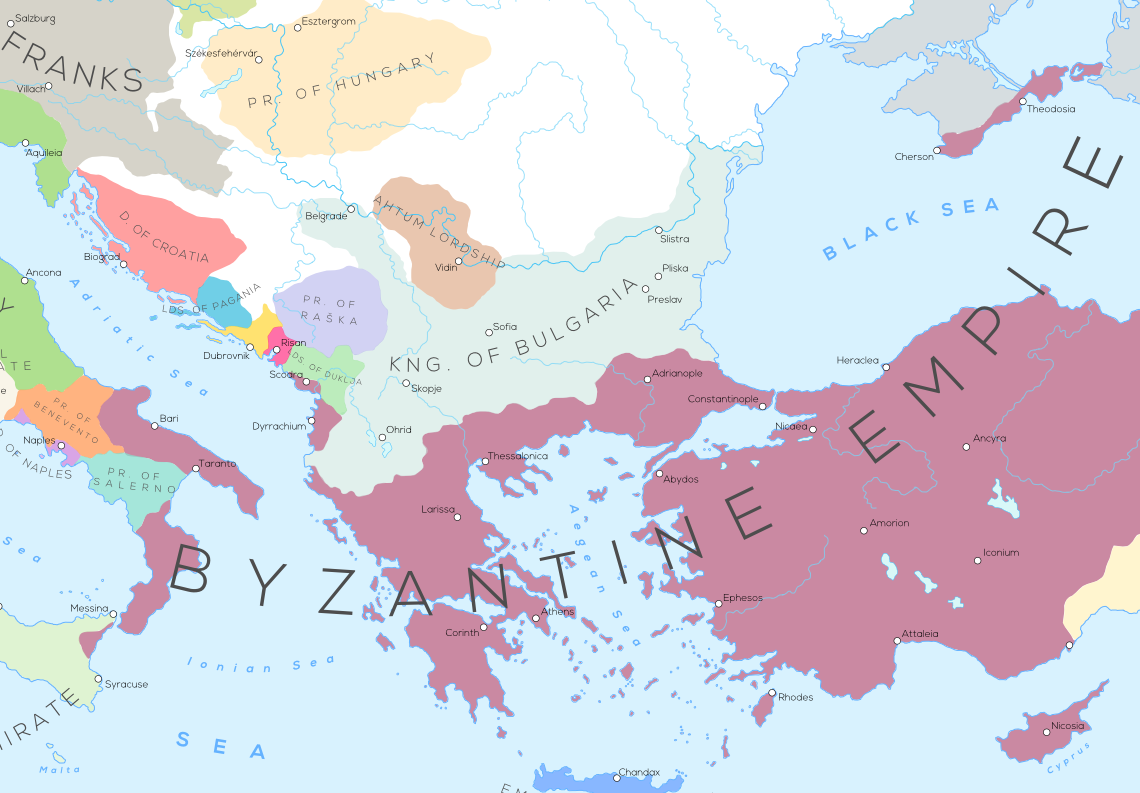
The Balkans, ca. 900

By the beginning of the 10th century, two powers had come to dominate the Balkans: the Byzantine Empire controlled the south of the peninsula and the coasts, and the Bulgarian Empire held the central and northern Balkans. The early decades of the century were dominated by Tsar Simeon (r. 893–927), who expanded his empire at Byzantium's expense in a series of wars and secured for himself recognition of his imperial title. Simeon's death in May 927 was soon followed by a rapprochement between the two powers, formalized with a treaty and a marriage alliance later that same year. Simeon's second son and successor, Peter I (r. 927–969), married Maria, the granddaughter of the Byzantine emperor Romanos I Lekapenos (r. 920–944), and his imperial title was recognized. An annual tribute (which the Byzantines termed a subsidy for Maria's upkeep, to save face) was agreed to be paid to the Bulgarian ruler in exchange for peace.

The agreement was kept for almost forty years as peaceful relations suited both sides. Bulgaria, despite the barrier formed by the Danube, was still menaced in its northern reaches by steppe peoples, the Magyars and the Pechenegs. They launched raids throughout Bulgaria, occasionally reaching Byzantine territory as well. The Byzantine–Bulgarian peace nevertheless meant less trouble from the north, as many Pecheneg raids had been sponsored by the Byzantines. Peter's reign, although lacking the military splendour of Simeon's, was still a "golden age" for Bulgaria, with a flourishing economy and a thriving urban society.

Byzantium used the peace to focus its energy on wars against the Abbasid Caliphate in the East, where a series of campaigns under generals John Kourkouas and Nikephoros Phokas greatly expanded imperial territory. At the same time, military reforms created a much more effective and offensively oriented army. The Byzantines did not neglect the Balkans, working steadily to improve their contacts with the peoples of central and eastern Europe, subtly altering the balance of power in the peninsula. Their Crimean outpost of Cherson maintained trade with the Pechenegs and the emerging power of the Kievan Rus'; Byzantine missionaries led the Christianization of the Magyars; and the Slavic princes of the western Balkans came to once again acknowledge the suzerainty of the Empire, particularly after Časlav Klonimirović ended Bulgarian control over Serbia. These relationships on the periphery of the Bulgarian Empire were an important asset for Byzantine diplomacy: instigating attacks against Bulgaria by the Pechenegs and the Khazars was a time-honoured method of applying pressure on the Bulgarians.

Upon the sudden death of Emperor Romanos II in 963, Nikephoros Phokas usurped the throne from Romanos' infant sons and became senior emperor as Nikephoros II (r. 963–969). Nikephoros, a prominent member of the Anatolian military aristocracy, also focused mostly on the East, leading his army personally in campaigns that recovered Cyprus and Cilicia. Thus things stood when a Bulgarian embassy visited Nikephoros in late 965 or early 966 to collect the tribute owed. Nikephoros, his confidence boosted by his recent successes, and deeming the Bulgarian ruler's demand presumptuous, refused to pay, claiming that with Empress Maria's recent death (ca. 963) any such obligations had ceased. He had the envoys beaten and sent them home with threats and insults. He proceeded with his troops to Thrace, where he staged an elaborate parade as a display of military strength and sacked a few Bulgarian border forts. Nikephoros' decision to effect a breach of relations with Bulgaria was also in response to the recent treaty that Peter I had signed with the Magyars. The treaty stipulated that the Magyars would be allowed to pass through the country and raid Byzantium in exchange for halting their raids in Bulgaria.

Anxious to avoid war, Tsar Peter sent his two sons, Boris and Roman, as hostages to Constantinople. This move failed to appease Nikephoros, but he was not able or willing to campaign against Bulgaria; his forces were engaged in the East, and furthermore, drawing on the Byzantines' past experience, Nikephoros was reluctant to mount an expedition into the mountainous and heavily forested terrain of Bulgaria. Consequently, he resorted to the old Byzantine expedient of calling in a tribe from eastern Europe to attack Bulgaria. In late 966 or early 967, (Note: The chronology of the Byzantine embassy to Kiev and Sviatoslav's invasion and conquest of Bulgaria is uncertain, since the sources disagree with each other. Various interpretations have been offered and different dates are used by modern scholars. For these cases, all alternative dates have been provided in this article.) he dispatched the patrikios Kalokyros, a citizen of Cherson, as his ambassador to Sviatoslav, ruler of the Rus'. The Byzantines had long maintained close relations with the Rus', with whom they were bound by treaty. With promises of rich rewards and, according to Leo the Deacon, a payment of 1,500 pounds of gold, the Rus' ruler was induced to attack Bulgaria from the north. That Nikephoros should call upon Sviatoslav for aid was unusual, since the Pechenegs were traditionally used for such tasks. The historian A.D. Stokes, who examined the questions surrounding the background and chronology of Sviatoslav's Bulgarian campaign, suggested that this move had a second motive of turning the attention of Sviatoslav, who had recently destroyed the Khazar khanate, away from the Byzantine outpost of Cherson.

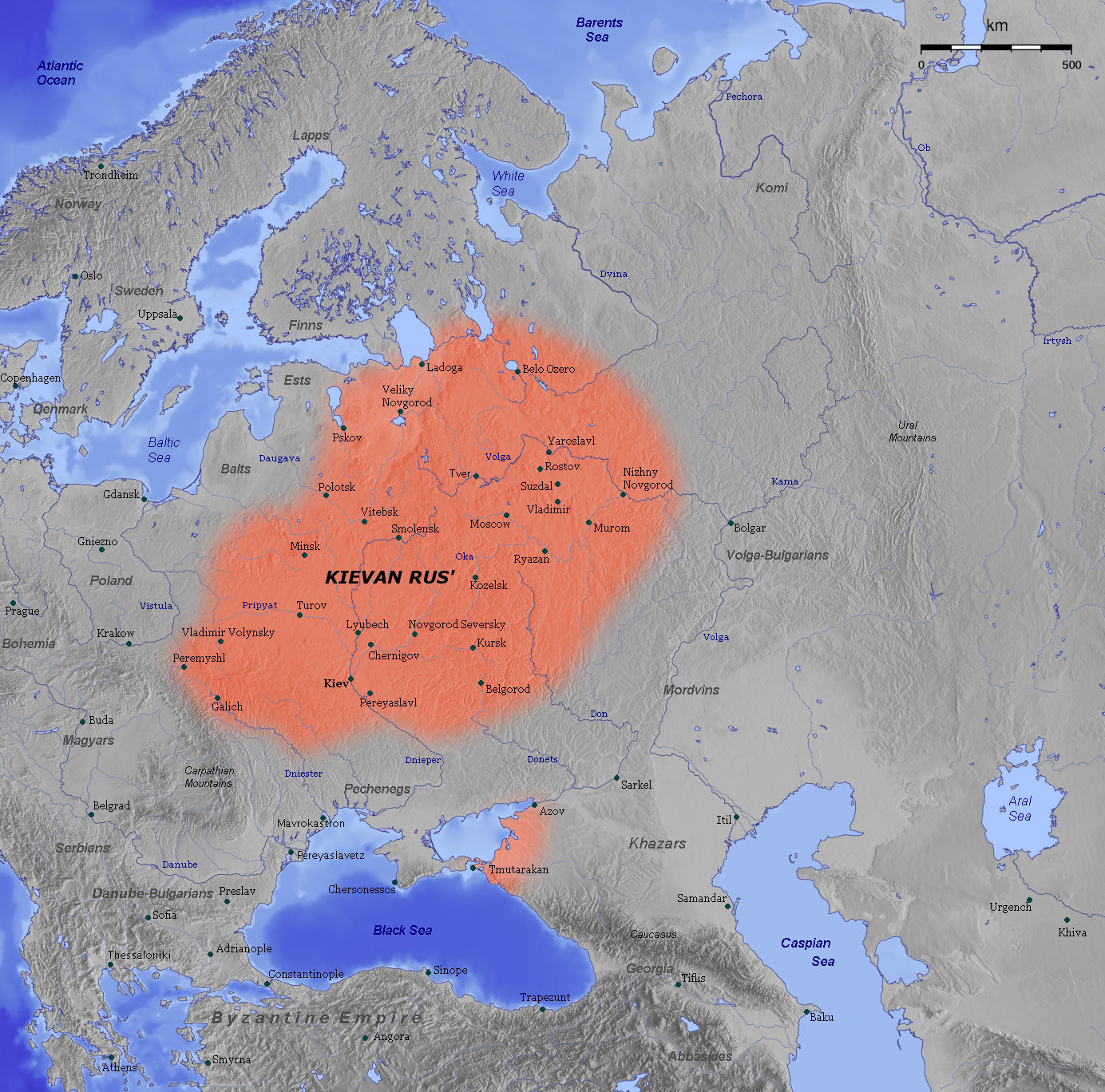
Kievan Rus', mid-10th century

== Bulgarian campaign ==
Sviatoslav enthusiastically agreed to the Byzantine proposal. In August 967 or 968, the Rus' crossed the Danube into Bulgarian territory, defeated a Bulgarian army of 30,000 men in the Battle of Silistra, and occupied most of the Dobruja. According to the Bulgarian historian Vasil Zlatarski, Sviatoslav seized 80 towns in northeastern Bulgaria. They were looted and destroyed but not permanently occupied. Tsar Peter I suffered an epileptic stroke when he received news of the defeat. The Rus' wintered at Pereyaslavets, while the Bulgarians retreated to the fortress of Dorostolon (Silistra). The next year, Sviatoslav left with part of his army to counter a Pecheneg attack on his capital at Kiev (incited either by the Byzantines or, according to the Primary Chronicle, by the Bulgarians). At the same time, Tsar Peter sent a new embassy to Byzantium, a visit that was recorded by Liutprand of Cremona. In contrast to their previous reception, this time the Bulgarian envoys were treated with great honour. Nevertheless, Nikephoros, confident of his position, demanded harsh terms: Tsar Peter was to resign and be replaced by Boris, and the two young emperors, Basil and Constantine, were to be married to Bulgarian princesses, daughters of Boris.

I do not wish to remain in Kiev, but I would live in Pereyaslavets on the Danube. There will be the center of my lands; for there flow all good things: gold from the Greeks [Byzantines], precious fabrics, wines and fruits of many kinds; silver and horses from the Czechs and Magyars; and from the Rus', furs, wax, honey, and slaves.

— Sviatoslav I of Kiev, on the Primary Chronicle

Peter retired to a monastery, where he died in 969, while Boris was released from Byzantine custody and recognized as Tsar Boris II. For the moment, it appeared that Nikephoros' plan had worked. However, Sviatoslav's brief sojourn into the south awakened in him the desire to conquer these fertile and rich lands. In this intention he was apparently encouraged by the former Byzantine envoy, Kalokyros, who coveted the imperial crown for himself. Thus, after defeating the Pechenegs, he set up viceroys to rule Kievan Rus' in his absence and turned his sights southward again.

In summer 969, Sviatoslav returned to Bulgaria in force, accompanied by allied Pecheneg and Magyar contingents. In his absence, Pereyaslavets had been recovered and the remaining Rus' garrisons in the remaining conquered fortresses were repulsed by the Bulgarian army; However, Svyatoslav was greeted coldly everywhere, besides, he was attacked by a large Bulgarian army nearby Preslav, Svyatoslav forced the Bulgarians to retreat to the city and took it by storm. There Boris continued to reside and exercise nominal authority as Sviatoslav's vassal. In reality he was little more than a figurehead, retained in order to lessen Bulgarian resentment at and reaction to the Rus' presence. Sviatoslav appears to have been successful in enlisting Bulgarian support. Bulgarian soldiers joined his army in considerable numbers, tempted partly by the prospects of booty, but also enticed by Sviatoslav's anti-Byzantine designs and probably mollified by a shared Slavic heritage. The Rus' ruler himself was careful not to alienate his new subjects: he forbade his army from looting the countryside or plundering cities that surrendered peacefully.

Thus Nikephoros' scheme had backfired: Instead of a weak Bulgaria, a new and warlike nation had been established at the Empire's northern border, and Sviatoslav showed every intention of continuing his advance south into Byzantium. The emperor tried to get the Bulgarians to resume the war against the Rus', but his proposals were not heeded. Then, on 11 December 969, Nikephoros was murdered in a palace coup and succeeded by John I Tzimiskes (r. 969–976), to whom fell the task of dealing with the situation in the Balkans. The new emperor sent envoys to Sviatoslav, proposing negotiations. The Rus' ruler demanded a huge sum before he would withdraw, insisting that otherwise the Empire should abandon its European territories to him and withdraw to Asia Minor. For the time being, Tzimiskes was preoccupied with consolidating his position and countering the unrest of the powerful Phokas clan and its adherents in Asia Minor. He therefore entrusted the war in the Balkans to his brother-in-law, the Domestic of the Schools Bardas Skleros, and to the eunuch stratopedarch Peter.

== Byzantine campaign ==
In early 970, a Rus' army, with large contingents of Bulgarians, Pechenegs, and Magyars, crossed the Balkan Mountains and headed south. The Rus' stormed the city of Philippopolis (now Plovdiv), and, according to Leo the Deacon, impaled 20,000 of its surviving inhabitants. Skleros, with an army of 10,000–12,000 men, confronted the Rus' advance near Arcadiopolis (now Luleburgaz) in early spring 970. The Byzantine general, whose army was considerably outnumbered, used a feigned retreat to draw the Pecheneg contingent away from the main army into a prepared ambush. The main Rus' army panicked and fled, suffering heavy casualties at the hands of the pursuing Byzantines. The Rus' withdrew north of the Balkan mountain range, which gave Tzimiskes time to deal with internal unrest and to assemble his forces.

== Byzantine offensive ==
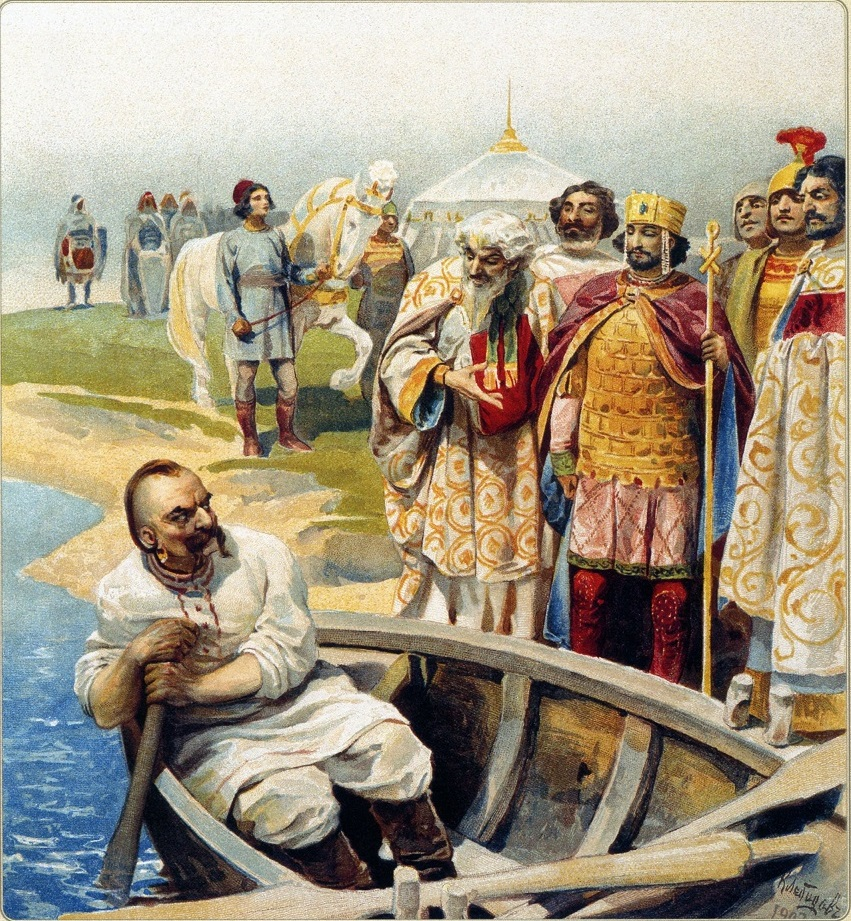
The meeting of Sviatoslav with Emperor John Tzimiskes, painting by Klavdy Lebedev

After being occupied with suppressing the revolt of Bardas Phokas throughout the year 970, Tzimiskes marshalled his forces in early 971 for a campaign against the Rus', moving his troops from Asia to Thrace and gathering supplies and siege equipment. The Byzantine navy accompanied the expedition, tasked with carrying troops to effect a landing in the enemy's rear and to cut off their retreat across the Danube. The emperor chose Easter week of 971 to make his move, catching the Rus' completely by surprise: The passes of the Balkan mountains had been left unguarded, either because the Rus' were busy suppressing Bulgarian revolts or perhaps (as A.D. Stokes suggests) because a peace agreement that had been concluded after the battle of Arcadiopolis made them complacent.

The Byzantine army, led by Tzimiskes in person and numbering 30,000–40,000, advanced quickly and reached Preslav unmolested. The Rus' army was defeated in a battle before the city walls, and the Byzantines proceeded to lay siege. The Rus' and Bulgarian garrison under the Rus' noble Sphangel (Note: John Skylitzes names Sphangel or Sphengel as Sviatoslav's second-in-command, with Ikmor as the third most important military leader, while Leo the Deacon reverses this order. Ikmor was killed in battle in front of Dorostolon. Sphangel is usually identified with Sveneld from the Primary Chronicle. The Greek chroniclers record that Sphangel was also killed at Dorostolon, but the Primary Chronicle has Sveneld survive the war and the subsequent Pecheneg ambush which claimed Sviatoslav's life.) put up a determined resistance, but the city was stormed on 13 April. Among the captives were Boris II and his family, who were brought to Constantinople along with the Bulgarian imperial regalia. The main Rus' force under Sviatoslav withdrew before the imperial army towards Dorostolon on the Danube. As Sviatoslav feared a Bulgarian uprising, he had 300 Bulgarian nobles executed, and imprisoned many others. The imperial army advanced without hindrance; the Bulgarian garrisons of the various forts and strongholds along the way surrendered peacefully.

As the Byzantines neared Dorostolon, they came upon the Rus' army, which had deployed on a field before the city, ready for battle. After a long and bitter struggle, the Byzantines won the day when Tzimiskes ordered his heavy cataphract cavalry to advance. The Rus' quickly broke ranks and fled inside the fortress. The subsequent siege of Dorostolon lasted for three months, during which the Byzantines blockaded the city by land and sea and the Rus' attempted several sallies. Three pitched battles were fought, all of which ended in Byzantine victories. After the final and particularly savage battle in late July, the Rus' were forced to capitulate. According to Byzantine chroniclers, by that time only 22,000 out of an army of originally 60,000 remained. Tzimiskes and Sviatoslav met and agreed to a peace treaty: The Rus' army was allowed to depart, leaving their captives and plunder behind, and their trading rights were re-affirmed in exchange for an oath to never again attack imperial territory. Sviatoslav would not long outlive the peace settlement, as he was slain on his way home in a Pecheneg ambush at the river Dnieper.

== Aftermath ==
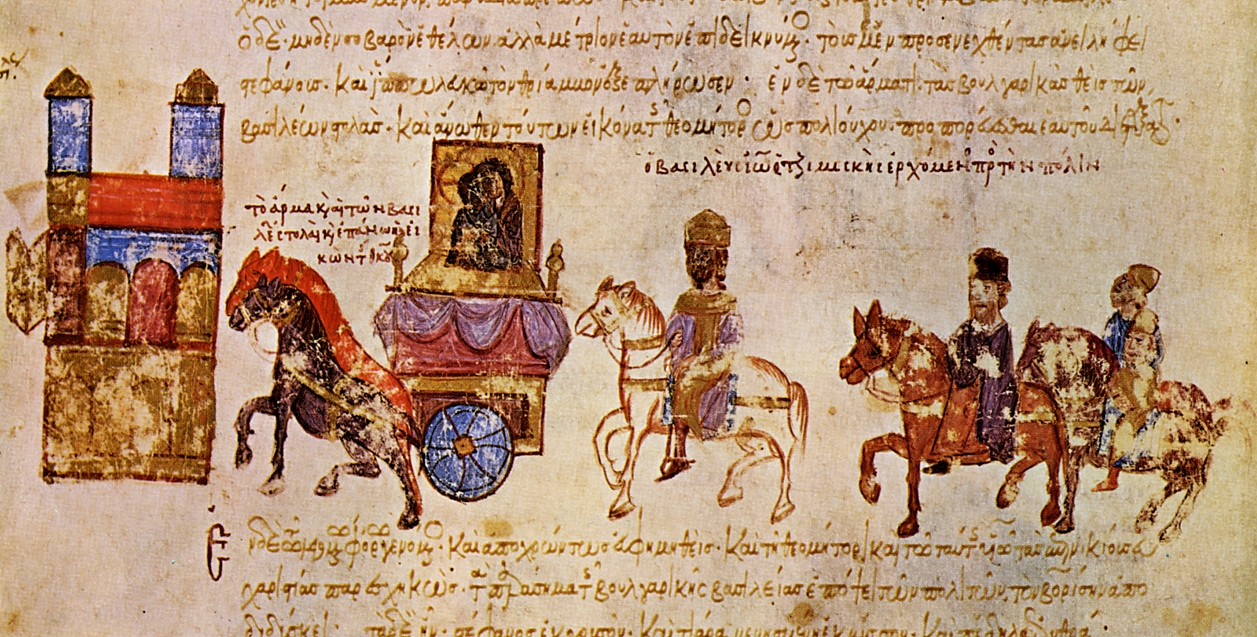
Depiction of Tzimiskes' triumph in the Madrid Skylitzes: The emperor, on a white horse, follows the wagon with the icon of the Virgin and the Bulgarian regalia, while the Bulgarian tsar Boris II follows further behind.

The outcome of the war was a complete Byzantine victory, and Tzimiskes decided to take full advantage. Although he initially recognized Boris II as the legitimate Bulgarian tsar, after the fall of Dorostolon his intentions changed. This became evident during his triumphal return to Constantinople, where the emperor entered the Golden Gate behind a wagon carrying an icon of the Virgin Mary as well as the Bulgarian regalia, with Boris and his family following behind Tzimiskes. When the procession reached the Forum of Constantine, Boris was publicly divested of his imperial insignia, and at the church of Hagia Sophia, the Bulgarian crown was dedicated to God.

This marked the symbolic end of Bulgaria as an independent state, at least in Byzantine eyes. Byzantine generals were installed in the eastern parts of the country along the Danube. Preslav was renamed Ioannopolis in honour of the emperor, and Dorostolon (or perhaps Pereyaslavets) was renamed Theodoropolis after St. Theodore the Stratelate, who was believed to have intervened in the final battle before Dorostolon. Tzimiskes reduced the Bulgarian patriarchate to an archbishopric subject to the Patriarch of Constantinople. He brought the Bulgarian royal family and many nobles to live in Constantinople and Asia Minor, while the region around Philippopolis was settled with Armenians. However, outside eastern Bulgaria, and there only in the major urban centres, Byzantine control existed only in theory. Tzimiskes, like Nikephoros Phokas, was more interested in the East. With the Rus' threat banished and Bulgaria seemingly pacified, his attention turned to Syria. No coordinated Byzantine drive to secure the interior of the Balkans was made. As a result, the north-central Balkans and Macedonia, where neither the Rus' nor Tzimiskes' troops had ventured, remained as before in the hands of the local Bulgarian elites.

In these areas, a Bulgarian resistance emerged, taking advantage of the Byzantine civil wars after the death of Tzimiskes in 976, led by the four sons of a count (comes) Nicholas, who became known as the Cometopuli ("sons of the count"). One of them, Samuel, revived the Bulgarian realm, now centered in Macedonia, and was crowned Tsar in 997. A formidable warrior, he led raiding campaigns into Byzantine territory as far south as the Peloponnese, and he engaged the Byzantine emperor Basil II (r. 976–1025) in a series of wars resulting in the final conquest of the Bulgarian state by the Byzantines in 1018. Nevertheless, due to the events of 971, the Byzantines would never regard him as anything other than a rebel against imperial authority, let alone concede the principle of equality enjoyed by the Bulgarian rulers before 971.

== Sources ==
- Karamzin, Nikolay (2020) [1824]. История Государства Российского [History of the Russian state]. Азбука. ISBN 978-5-4484-4482-1.
- Andreev, Jordan; Lalkov, Milcho (1996), The Bulgarian Khans and Tsars (in Bulgarian), Veliko Tarnovo: Abagar, ISBN 954-427-216-X
- Curta, Florin (2006). Southeastern Europe in the Middle Ages, 500–1250. Cambridge: Cambridge University Press. ISBN 978-0-521-81539-0.
- Fine, John V. A. Jr. (1991) [1983]. The Early Medieval Balkans: A Critical Survey from the Sixth to the Late Twelfth Century. Ann Arbor: University of Michigan Press. ISBN 0-472-08149-7.
- Haldon, John F. (2001), The Byzantine Wars, Stroud: Tempus, ISBN 978-0-7524-1795-0
- Hanak, Walter K. (1995), "The Infamous Svjatoslav: Master of Duplicity in War and Peace?", in Miller, Timothy S.; Nesbitt, John (eds.), Peace and War in Byzantium: Essays in Honor of George T. Dennis, S.J., Washington, D.C.: The Catholic University of America Press, ISBN 978-0-8132-0805-3
- Jakobsson, Sverrir, The Varangians: In God’s Holy Fire (Palgrave Macmillan, 2020), pp. 58-61. ISBN 978-3-030-53797-5
- Kazhdan, Alexander, ed. (1991). The Oxford Dictionary of Byzantium. Oxford and New York: Oxford University Press. ISBN 0-19-504652-8.
- Obolensky, Dimitri (1971), The Byzantine Commonwealth: Eastern Europe, 500–1453, New York: Praeger Publishers, ISBN 978-0-297-00343-4
- Runciman, Steven (1930), A History of the First Bulgarian Empire, London: George Bell & Sons, OCLC 832687
- Stephenson, Paul (2000), Byzantium's Balkan Frontier: A Political Study of the Northern Balkans, 900–1204, Cambridge; New York: Cambridge University Press, ISBN 0-521-77017-3
- Stokes, A.D. (1962), "The Background and Chronology of the Balkan Campaigns of Sviatoslav Igorevich", The Slavonic and East European Review, 40: 44–57
- Talbot, Alice-Mary; Sullivan, Dennis F., eds. (2005), The History of Leo the Deacon: Byzantine Military Expansion in the Tenth Century, Washington: Dumbarton Oaks, ISBN 978-0-88402-324-1
- Treadgold, Warren (1997). A History of the Byzantine State and Society. Stanford, California: Stanford University Press. ISBN 0-8047-2630-2.
- Whittow, Mark (1996). The Making of Byzantium, 600–1025. Berkeley and Los Angeles, California: University of California Press. ISBN 978-0-520-20496-6.
- Zlatarski, Vasil (1971) [1927], "Part II. From the Slavinization of the Country to the Fall of the First Empire (852–1018).", History of the Bulgarian state in the Middle Ages, Volume I. History of the First Bulgarian Empire (in Bulgarian) (2nd ed.), Sofia: Nauka i izkustvo, OCLC 67080314
- Gumilev, Lev (2023) [1992]. От Руси к России [For Rus' to Russia]. Эксклюзивная классика (revised ed.). Moscow: AST. ISBN 978-5-17-153845-3.
