= Predslava, Grand Princess of Kiev =

Predslava

Grand Princess of Kiev
- Died: 990
- Spouse: Svyatoslav I
- Issue: Oleg of Drelinia; Yaropolk I of Kiev
- Religion: Pagan

Predslava (Old East Slavic: Предслава) (?-990), was a Grand Princess of Kiev by marriage to Svyatoslav I, Grand Prince of Kiev (r. 945–972).

== Biography ==
There is little information about the wives of Grand Prince Svyatoslav. It is known that he had a harem. According to the Russian historian Vasily Tatishchev, the eldest wife was a Hungarian princess named Predstlavna. However, according to Ukrainian researcher Leontii Voitovych, this name is the result of Tatishchev's erroneous conclusion from the text of the 944 agreement between Russia and the Byzantine Empire. Otherwise, it is quite likely that the alliance with Hungary could have been sealed by a marriage with the daughter of the Hungarian prince Taksony. In addition, there is an opinion that Predslava was the daughter of a Kiev boyar or a Pecheneg khan.

There are reports that Predslava allegedly sent a mercenary to kill Malusha, Svyatoslav's concubine, but failed. After that, the Grand Prince sent his wife to the settlement, which received her name - Predslavino (according to another version, it is named after the daughter of the Grand Prince Vladimir). Further fate is unknown.

== Family ==
She is considered the mother of the Grand Prince Yaropolk, and sometimes also his brother Oleg. The researcher George Vernadsky suggested that the son of Predslava and Svyatoslav could be Volodyslav, who died young. However, she did not raise children, as her mother-in-law, the princess Olga took over.

== Issue ==
- Oleg of Drelinia (died 977?)
- Yaropolk I of Kiev (952 - 978)

== Sources ==
- Tatishchev V. N. История Российская, part 2, chapter 4, note. 148 (in Russian)
- Vernadsky H.V. The Golden Age of Kievan Rus. — M.: Algoritm, 2012 (in Russian)
- Voitovych L. Rurikovichi. Personal composition
- Predslava, Pereslava, Predyslava, Preslava
