= Rus' conquest of Khazar Khaganate =

964–965 Kievan Rus conquest

Khazar campaign of Svyatoslav
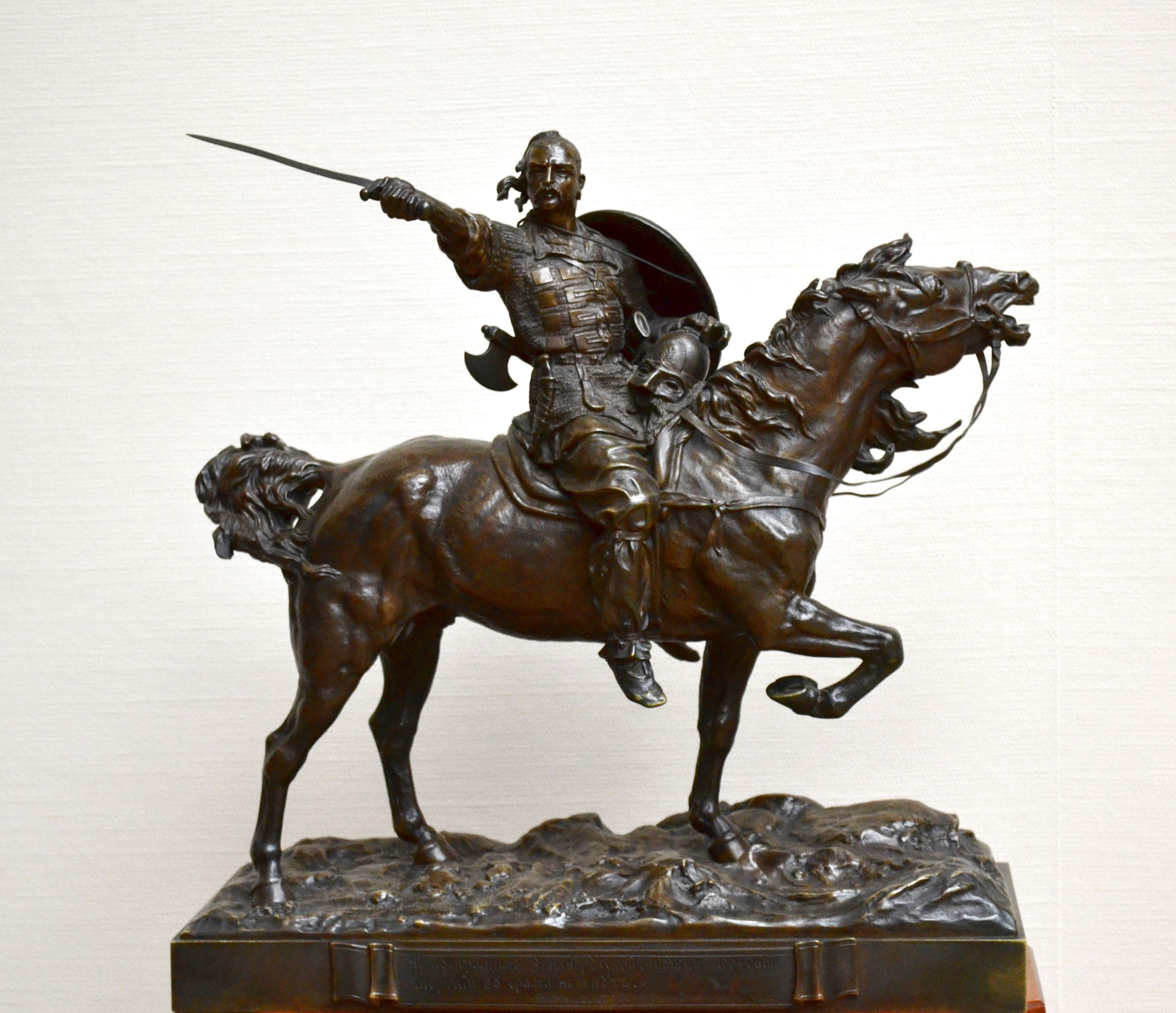
- Svyatoslav I by Eugene Lanceray (1886)
Date	964–965
Location	Volga region, Western coast of the Caspian Sea, Khazar Khaganate (now Russia)
Result	Kievan Rus' victory
Territorial changes	Kievan Rus' independence from Khazar Khaganate; Fall of Khazar Khaganate under Kievan Rus'

Belligerents
Kievan Rus'	Khazar Khaganate; Volga Bulgaria

Commanders and leaders
Svyatoslav I of Kiev	Qaghanbeg Joseph †: Balikçi Pesakh; Abraham ben Joseph Bulanid †; Salifan Bek †

Khazar campaign of Svyatoslav (Ukrainian: Хазарський похід Святослава;Russian: Хазарский поход Святослава) was a campaign during which the Rus troops led by Svyatoslav Igorevich defeated the neighboring Vyatichi tribe, and also put an end to the Khazar Khaganate. This campaign shattered the Khazar power and established the Rus as the hegemons of the Lower Volga.

== Campaign ==
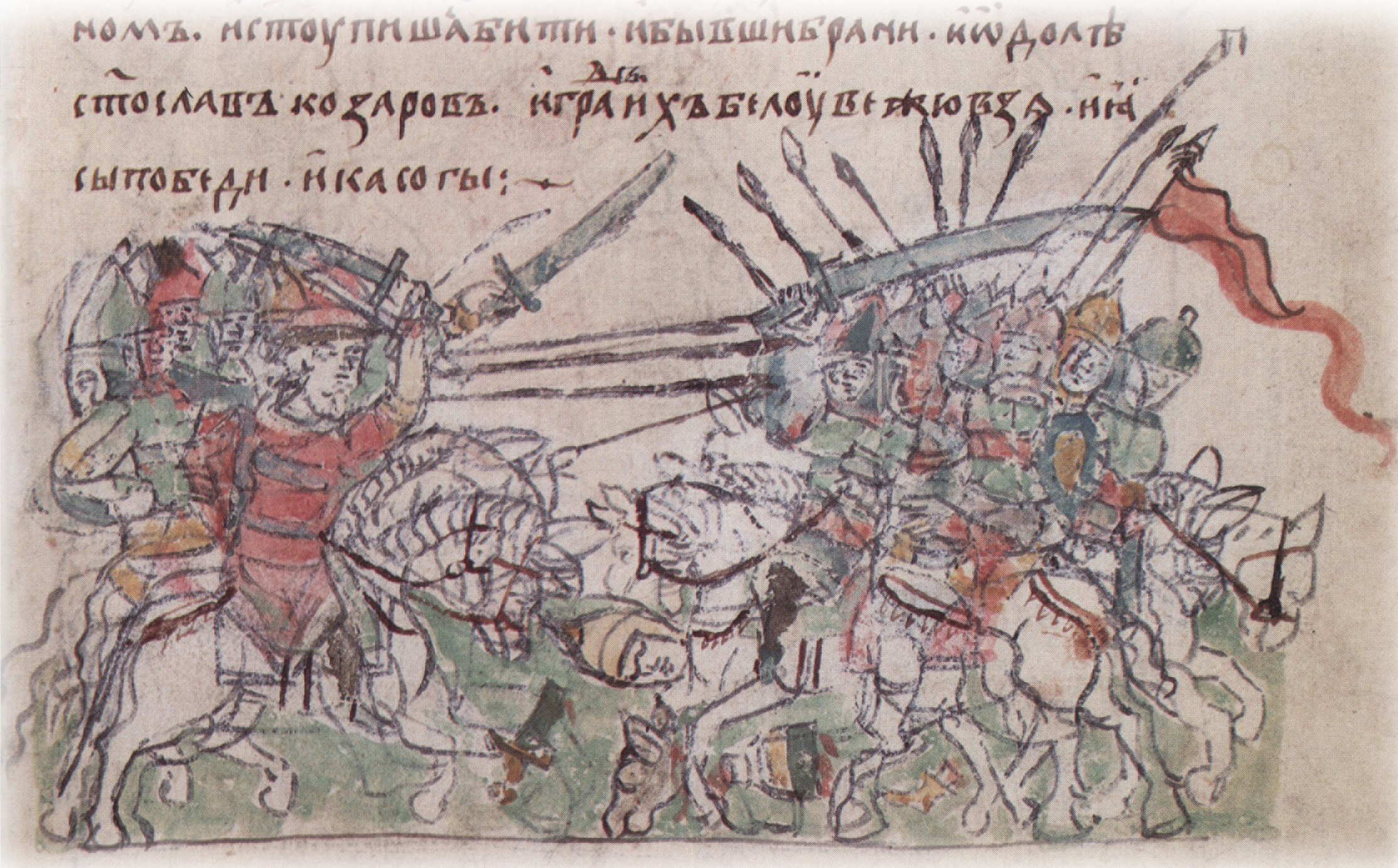
Battle of armies of Svyatoslav with armies of Khazar prince Kagan, ending with victory of Rus'. Miniature from the Radziwiłł Chronicle, the end of the 15th century

Having gathered a large army, the Grand Prince of Kiev first moved against the Vyatichi, who considered themselves tributaries of the Khazar Khaganate, defeated them and moved to fight against Khazaria. Having learned of this, the Khazar Khagan, together with his army, went to meet Svyatoslav, but the Rus' defeated him and took Sarkel. After Svyatoslav besieged Itil and took it, the Jews living there decided to make a sortie, but were completely defeated by the army of Kievan Rus'. Afterwards Svyatoslav moved to the Terek, to the city of Semender, having defeated it, he took the spoils and went across the Don to Rus'.

== Aftermath ==
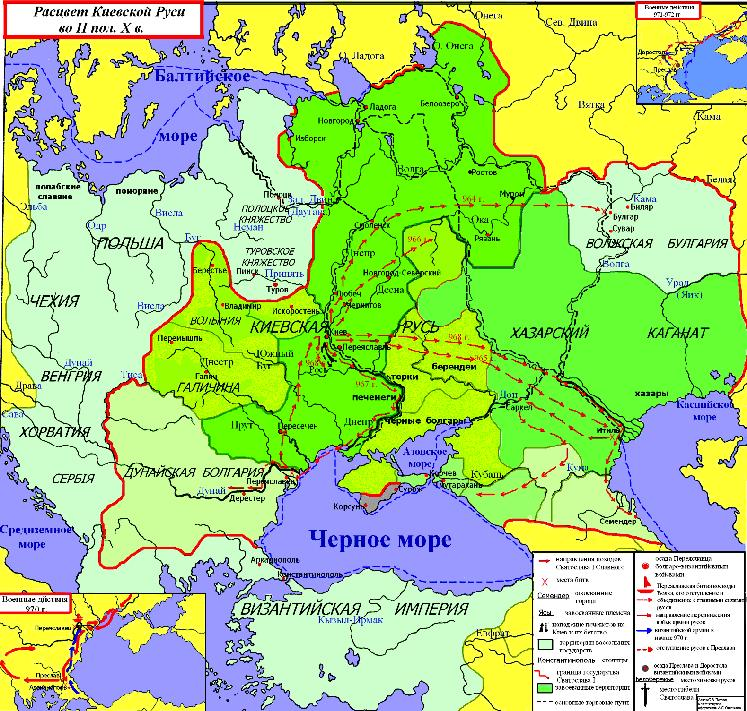
Rus' under Svyatoslav

As a result of this campaign, the Khazar Khaganate ceased to exist, and the Jews who lived there began to settle in other territories. Rus' became independent from the Khazar Khaganate and the largest cities of the Khazars have been looted. But it is noted that the centers of the Khazar state remained until the 11th century.
