= Sfengus =

Brother of Vladimir I of Kiev

According to John Skylitzes, Sfengus or Sphengos was a brother of Vladimir I of Kiev. Sfengus was a leader in the joint Byzantine-Kievan campaign to depose Georgius Tzul, the last recorded khagan of the Khazars.

Though identified as a brother of Vladimir I of Kiev, some historians such as Simon Franklin and Jonathan Shepard hypothesize that he is identical with Mstislav of Tmutarakan, Vladimir's son.

== Sources ==
- Franklin, Simon and Jonathan Shepard. The Emergence of Rus 750-1200. Longman, 1996.
