= Boris Chorikov =

Russian painter (1802–1866)

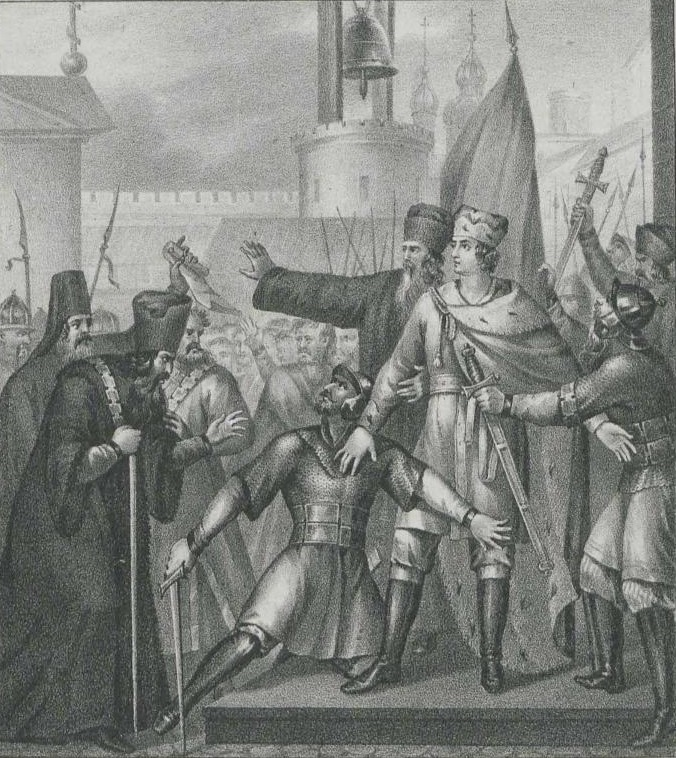
Engraving Prince Alexander Mikhailovich in Pskov (1836)

Boris Artemyevich Chorikov (Russian: Борис Артемьевич Чориков; 1802–1866) was a Russian graphic artist.

== Background ==
He is best known for his illustrations in a unique edition called Picturesque Karamzin, or Russian history in pictures (Russian:Живописный Карамзин или Русская история в картинах), which was published in St.Petersburg in 1836.
