= Leo the Deacon =

Byzantine Greek historian

Leo the Deacon (Greek: Λέων ο Διάκονος; born c. 950) was a Byzantine Greek historian and chronicler.

He was born around 950 at Kaloe in Asia Minor, and was educated in Constantinople, where he became a deacon in the imperial palace. While in Constantinople he wrote a history covering the reigns of Romanos II, Nikephoros II, John Tzimiskes, and the early part of the reign of Basil II. Often his observations were based on his experiences as an eyewitness to events. His writing style has been described as "Classical", as he employed language reminiscent of the poet Homer and other ancient Greek historians such as Agathias.

Leo is particularly well known for his eyewitness description of Sviatoslav I of Kiev, who invaded Bulgaria in 969 and fought against Byzantine Imperial forces over its territory.
