= History of Transnistria =

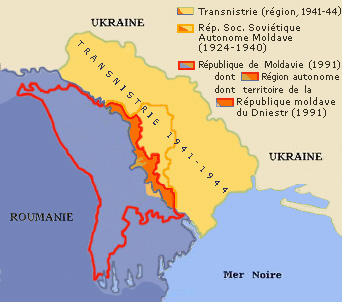
Changes of frontier in Transnistria: blue-Romania until 1940; orange: actual Transnistria; yellow: fascist Transnistria during WWII; red line: Moldavia 1991; orange line: communist MASSR

This is the history of Transnistria, officially the Pridnestrovian Moldavian Republic (PMR), an unrecognised breakaway state that is internationally recognised as part of Moldova. Transnistria controls most of the narrow strip of land between the Dniester river and the Moldovan–Ukrainian border, as well as some land on the other side of the river's bank.

== Before 1792 ==
=== Antiquity ===
In ancient history, the area was inhabited by Thracian and Scythian tribes. Pliny the Elder names the Tyragetae, a Getae tribe living on an island of the Dniester (ancient name "Tyras"), the Axiacae living along the Tiligul River (ancient "Axiaces") and the Crobyzi, a Thracian tribe living beyond the Dniester.

At the mouth of the river, the Ancient Greeks of Miletus founded around 600 BC a colony named Tyras, which was located outside present-day Transnistria. It fell under the dominion of native kings whose names appear on its coins, and it was destroyed by the Dacians about 50 BC.

In 56 AD Tyras had been restored by the Romans and henceforth formed part of the province of Lower Moesia, which also included Dobruja (part of Romania) and northeastern Bulgaria. Romans settled colonists in Tyras and maintained some legionaries in the area (even in Olbia) until the 4th century.

Historian Theodore Mommsen wrote that "Moldavia and the south half of Bessarabia as well as the whole of Wallachia were incorporated in the Roman Empire".

All these facts confirm the creation of defensive earth dykes (called Trajan Walls) from the Prut river to the Tyras area, in order to defend these new territories of the Roman Empire. Furthermore, Mommsen wrote, "Bessarabia is intersected by a double barrier-line which, running from the Pruth to the Dniester, ends at Tyra and appears to proceeds from the Romans".

The Walls, which, three metres in height and two meters in thickness, with broad outer fosse and many remains of forts, stretch in two almost parallel lines... from the Pruth to the Dniester... may be also Roman.

In the Late Roman period, the extent of control and military occupation over territory north of the Danube in actual Bessarabia remains controversial. One Roman fort (Pietroasa de Jos), well beyond the Danubian Limes and near actual Moldavia, would seem to have been occupied in the 4th century AD, as were bridge-head forts (Sucidava, Barboşi, and the unlocated Constantiniana Daphne) along the left bank of the river. In this Roman fort, built by Constantine I, researchers have found even a thermae building in the 1980s.

In the 4th century the Goths conquered Tyras and Olbia on the coast, but the final destruction of those merchant cities happened with the Attila invasions one century later. The area of Transnistria was under the rule of the Goths, who, in the 4th century, were divided into the "Tervingi" and "Greuthungi" tribes, (traditionally identified with the Visigoths and Ostrogoths), the border between them being on the Dniester river.

=== Moldovan and Slavic settlement ===
Transnistria was an early crossroads of people and cultures, including the South Slavs, who reached it in the 6th century. Some East Slavic tribes (Ulichs and Tivertsy) may have lived in it, but they were pushed further north by Turkic nomads such as Pechenegs and the Cumans. In the 10th century, the "Volohove" (Vlachs, i.e. Romanians) are mentioned in the area of Danube in the Primary Chronicle. Indeed, some academics believe that on the coast between the Dniester and Danube rivers there was a romance speaking community until 1050 AD, that was destroyed by the Pechenegs

=== From Kievan Rus' to the Polish–Lithuanian Commonwealth ===
Map illustrating the location of Bracław Voivodeship in the Polish–Lithuanian Commonwealth

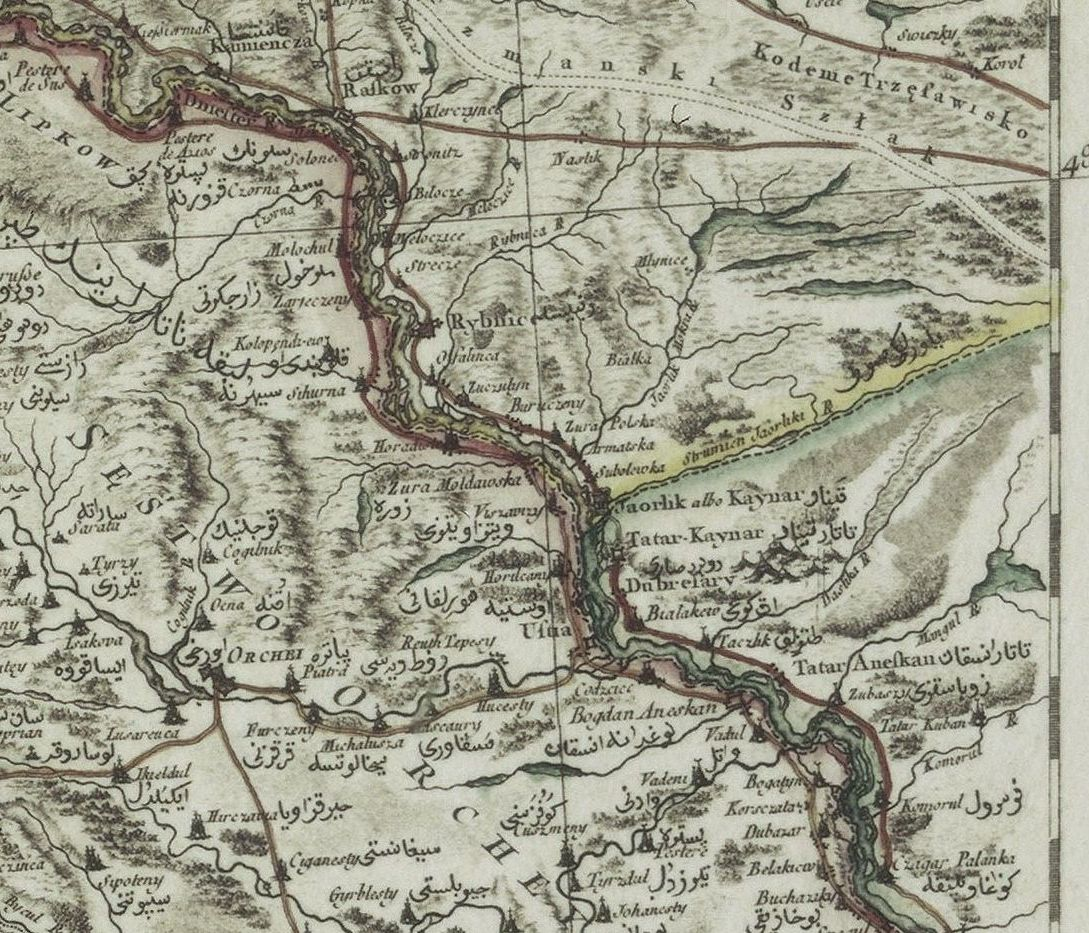
Map from 1772 CE illustrating settlements along the border between Bracław Voivodeship in the Polish–Lithuanian Commonwealth, the Crimean Khanate, and the Principality of Moldavia

Transnistria was inhabited mainly by the Cumans and wars against them may have brought the territory under the control of the Kievan Rus' at times around the 11th century. It became a formal part of the Grand Duchy of Lithuania in the 15th century. While most of today's Moldova came into the Ottoman orbit at this time, much of Transnistria remained a part of the Polish–Lithuanian Commonwealth until the Second Partition of Poland in 1793 as part of Bratslav Voivodeship, save for short periods of Cossack Hetmanate in 1648–1672 as Bratslav Regiment and Ottoman Empire in 1672–1684 as Podolia Eyalet.

On the coast the Byzantines built a fortress in the area of the destroyed Tyras and named it Asprocastron ("White Castle" – a meaning kept in several languages, like in actual Ukrainian Bilhorod). In the 14th century, the city was controlled and renovated by the Republic of Genoa, which established a trading center there until the Ottoman conquest. A small part of the population of this city escaped the Turkish invasion and founded a village to the north that later became the city of Tiraspol, now capital of Transnistria.

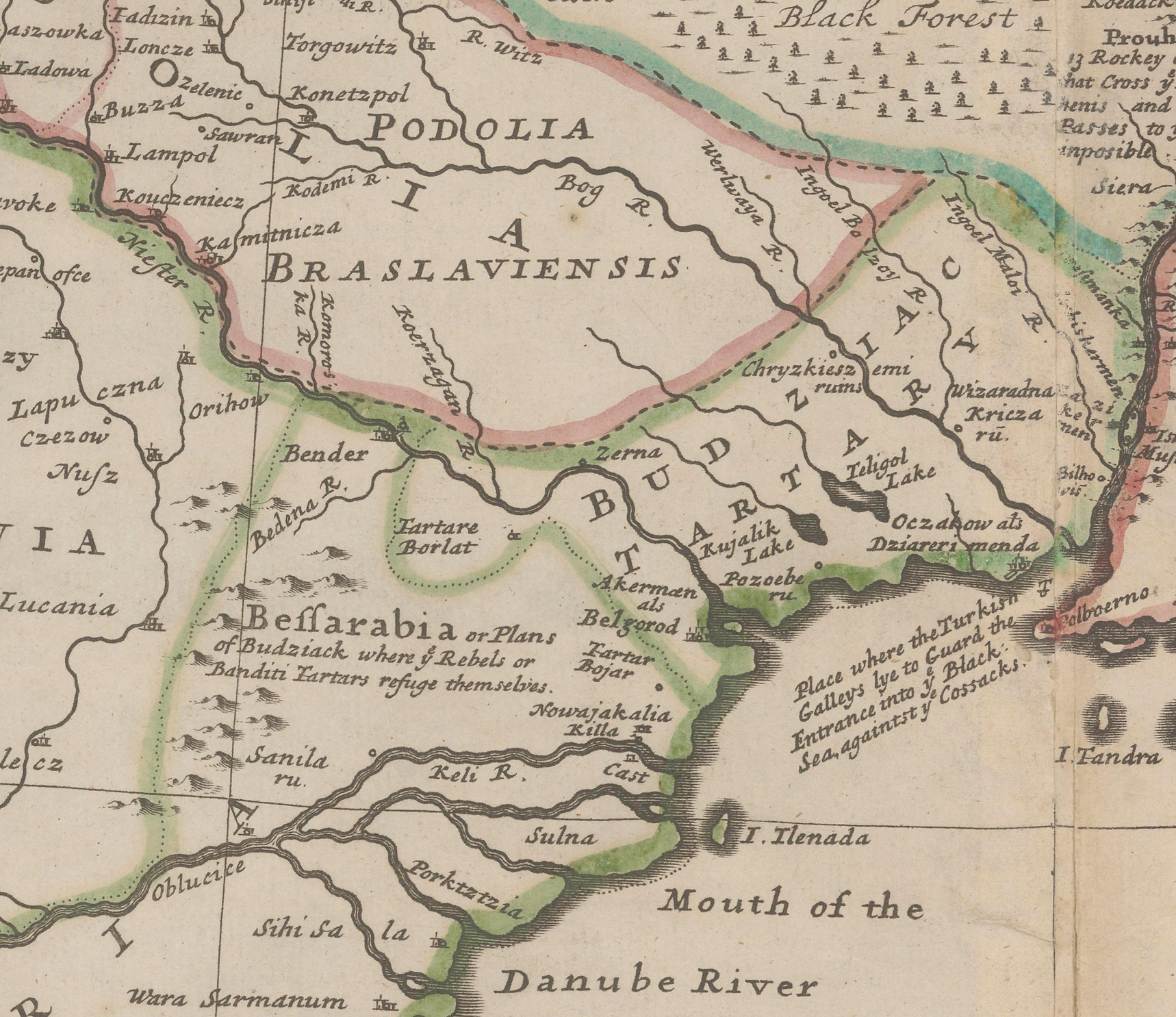
A map of lower Dniester at the beginning of XVIII c., bordered with Bracław Voivodeship, Budziac Tartary, Moldavia and Bessarabia. Visible city of Kamitnicza (Camenca) and Bender. Map by Herman Moll (around 1720)

Meanwhile, the Crimean Khanate conquered the southern portion of Transnistria south of the Iagorlîc/Jagorlyk river, which was included in 1504 in the region of Yedisan and was under the control of the Ottoman Empire until 1792. The northern part (North of the Iagorlîc river) remained under the control of the Grand Duchy of Lithuania, as part of the historical region of Podolia (part of the Polish Kingdom until 1793). The border between the two states was set on a brook known in Moldavian chronicles as Iahurlîc and in Polish source as Jahorlik or Jahorłyk (today Iagorlîc, in Transnistria).

Moldavia started from its nucleus in Bukovina and soon reached Prut and by the end of the 14th century the Dnister, which was set as their easternmost border.

While there were some Moldavian military incursions beyond the Dniester in the 15th century, the earliest written evidence of Moldavian settlement beyond the Dnister dates from the 16th century: a 1541 letter written by Suleiman the Magnificent to Polish Sigismund II Augustus says that some of his Moldavian subjects plundered Tighina and Akkerman and then retreated and settled in the Polish territory.

=== Modern Era ===
While the territory beyond the Dniester was never politically part of Moldavia, some areas of today's Transnistria were owned by Moldavian boyars, being given by the Moldavian rulers. The earliest surviving deeds referring to lands beyond the Dnister date from the 16th century. Moldavian chronicle Grigore Ureche mentions that in 1584, some Moldavian villages from beyond the Dniester in the Polish territory were attacked and plundered by Cossacks. Many Moldovans were members of Cossacks units, two of them, Ivan Pidkova and Danylo Apostol, were hetmans of Ukraine.

Along with a nomadic Nogai Tatar population, the area was populated by Moldovans, Ukrainians, Poles, and Russians. In 1927, Columbia University Professor Charles Upson Clark, wrote that the lower Dniester was "an almost purely Romanian stream" with Romanian villages from Mohyliv-Podilskyi to Ovidiopol.

== Russian Empire ==
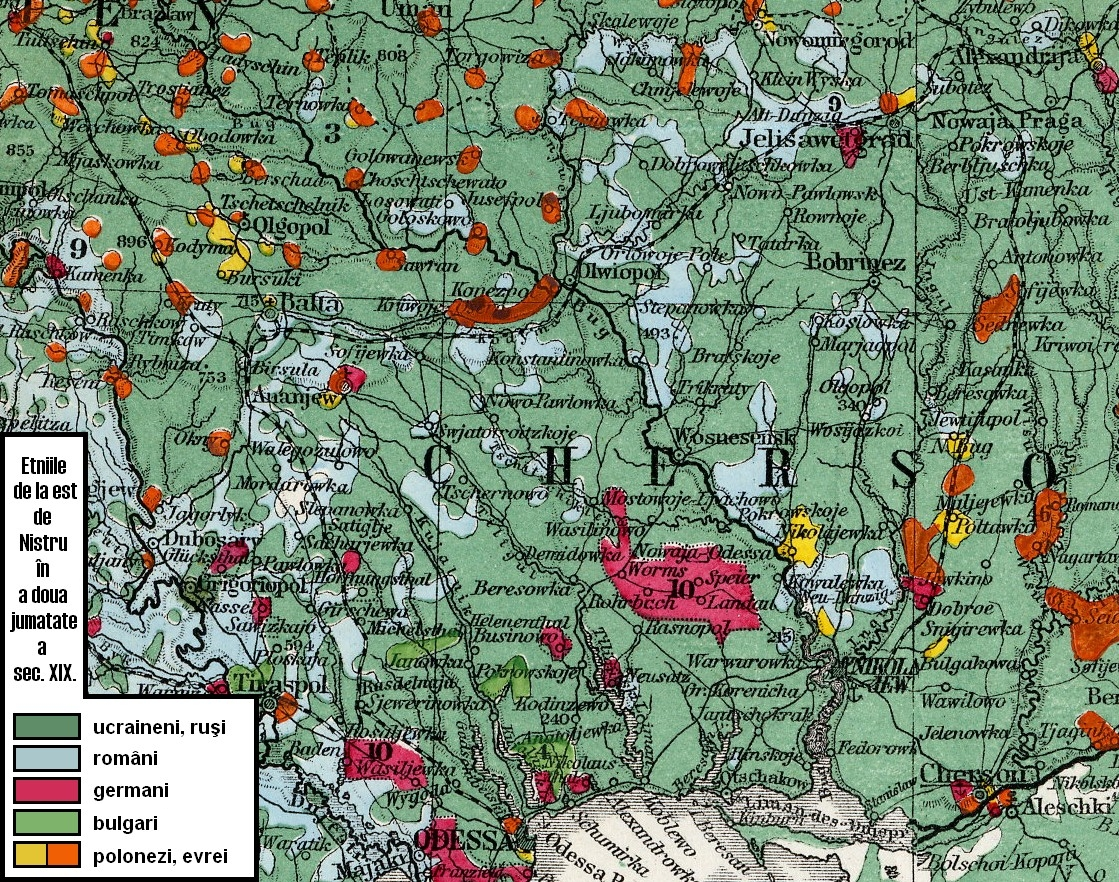
Map showing the presence of Vlachs/Romanians (blue color) even east of the Bug river and up to the Dnieper river in the 19th century

In 1792, the southern part of Transnistria was ceded by Ottoman Empire to the Russian Empire. The part north of the Iagorlîc River was annexed by Russia in 1793 in the Second Partition of Poland. At that time, the population was sparse and the Russian Empire encouraged large migrations into the region, including people of Ukrainian, Moldovan, Polish, Russian and German ethnicity.

Russia began attempting to lure Romanian settlers (mostly from Moldavia, but also from Transylvania, Bukovina and Muntenia) to settle in its territory in 1775, after it gained the largely uninhabited territory between the Dnieper and the Bug. But the colonization was to be in a larger scale after 1792/3, to Transnistria and beyond, when the Russian government declared that the region of steppes without population between the Dniester and the Southern Bug was to become a new principality named "New Moldavia", under Russian suzerainty.

Indeed, the colonization had reached in the previous century the Kyiv area (then known as New Serbia) and in 1712 even the Don river, with the Dimitrie Cantemir leadership.

Plots of tax-exempt land were distributed amongst Moldavian peasants, while 56 Moldavian boyars (belonging to famous families like Rosetti, Cantacuzino, Catargiu and Sturdza) received large estates which they helped colonize. Dozens of new villages were founded during this colonization stage, which lasted until 1812, when Russia integrated East Moldova and Transnistria ceased to be a borderland.

In the 1890s there were the following fully Moldovan villages in the Bug river area: Iasca, Gradinita, Sevartaica, Belcauca (in the direction of Ovideopol), Malaiesti, Floarea, Tei, Cosarca, Buturul, Perperita, Goiana, Siclia, Corotna, Cioburceni, Speia, Caragaciu, Taslic, Dorotcaia, Voznisevsca (on the Bug), Moldovca si Cantacuzinovca. Indeed, in 1893 according to official data there were 532,416 Romance speaking people (Moldovans and Wallachians) in Kherson and Podolia, 11,813 – in Ecaterinoslav, and 4,015 in Tauridia (Crimea).

== 1917–1924 ==
During World War I, representatives of the Romanian speakers beyond the Dniester (who numbered 173,982 in the 1897 census) participated in the Bessarabian national movement in 1917/1918, asking for the incorporation of their territory in Greater Romania. Nevertheless, Romania ignored their request, as it would have required a large-scale military intervention.

In May 1919, the local population of Bender began an uprising against Romanian rule. The uprising was swiftly suppressed by the Romanian Army together with a unit of French colonial troops.

At the end of World War I in 1918, the Directory of Ukraine proclaimed the sovereignty of the Ukrainian People's Republic over the left bank of the Dniester. After the Russian Civil War in 1922, the Ukrainian SSR was created.

== Soviet Era ==
The geopolitical concept of an autonomous Communist Transnistrian region was born in 1924, when Bessarabian military leader Grigore Kotovski proposed the founding of the Moldavian Autonomous Oblast, which months later became the Moldavian ASSR (MASSR) of the Ukrainian SSR. Its area was 8,677 km^{2} and included 11 raions on the left bank of Dniester.

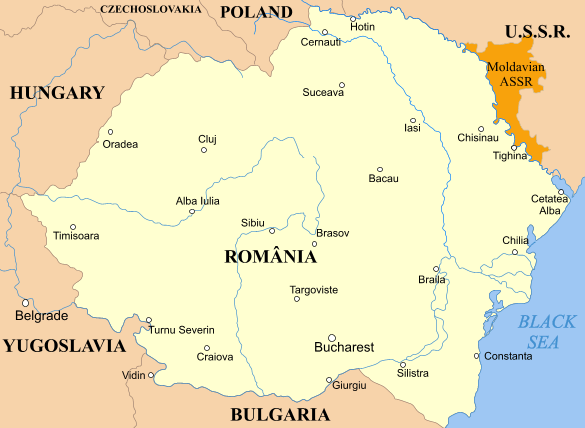
Moldavian ASSR (in orange) and Romania, 1924–1940

While the creation of ethnic-based autonomous polities was a general policy of the Soviets at that time, with the creation of MASSR the Soviet Union also hoped to bolster its claim to Bessarabia. Soviet authorities declared the "temporarily occupied city of Kishinev" as de jure capital of the |ASSR]

At that time, the population of MASSR was 48% Ukrainian, 30% Romanian/Moldavian, 9% Russian, and 8.5% Jewish. (see below)

In 1927 there was a massive uprising of peasants and factory workers in Tiraspol and also cities in the southern Ukrainian SSR (Mohyliv-Podilskyi, Kamianets-Podilskyi) against Soviet authorities. Soviet troops suppressed the unrest, causing around 4,000 deaths, according to US correspondents sent to report about the insurrection, which was at the time completely denied by the Kremlin official press.

During the 1920s and 1930s, thousands of Moldovan Transnistrians fled to Romania, the government of which set up a special Fund for their housing and education. A 1935 estimate put the number of refugees at 20,000.

Under Stalinist rule, populations who were not Ukrainian, Russian, or Moldovan were pressured to Russify, and their numbers declined further. After a brief initial period of liberalization and freedom, groups such as the Poles in the Soviet Union were subject to harassment, dispersal, and mass terror. This trend increased in the late 1930s, as a result of the 1937-8 Polish Operation of the NKVD as well as stopping education in MASSR for all non-Moldovan populations in their native languages.

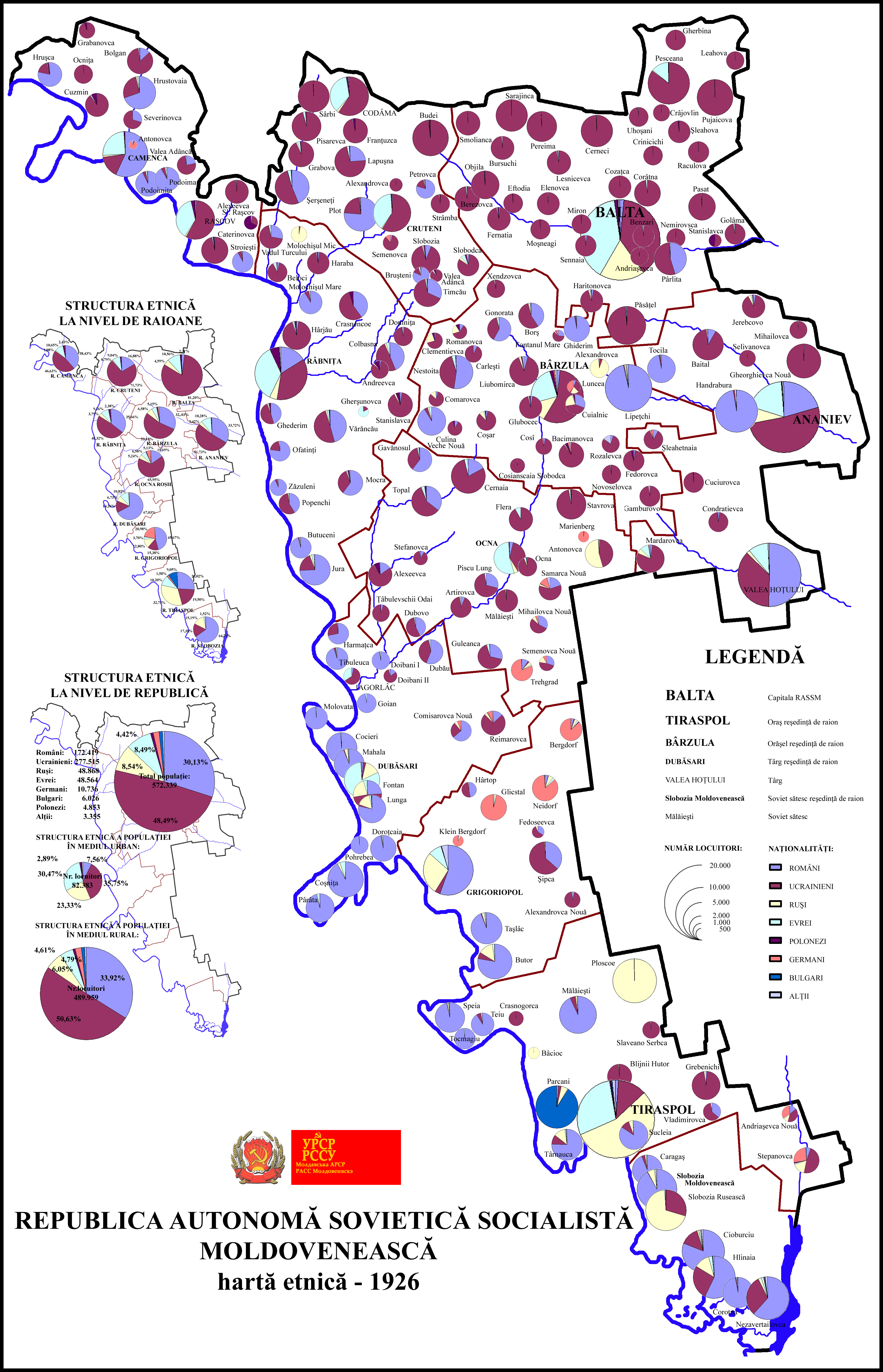
Ethnic composition of MASSR, 1926

According to the 1926 Soviet census, MASSR had a population of 572,339. In 1936, MASSR had a mixed Ukrainian (46%) and Moldovan (32%) population.

Ethnic group	census 1926		1936	
Ethnic group	Number	%	Number	%
Ukrainians	277,515	48.5%	265,193	45.5%
Moldovans	172,419	30.1%	184,046	31.6%
Russians	48,868	8.5%	56,592	9.7%
Jews	48,564	8.5%	45,620	7.8%
Germans	10,739	1.9%	12,711	2.2%
Bulgarians	6,026	1.1%		
Poles	4,853	0.8%		
Romani	918	0.2%		
Romanians	137	0.0%		
Other	2,300	0.4%	13,526	2.4%
Total	572,339		582,138	

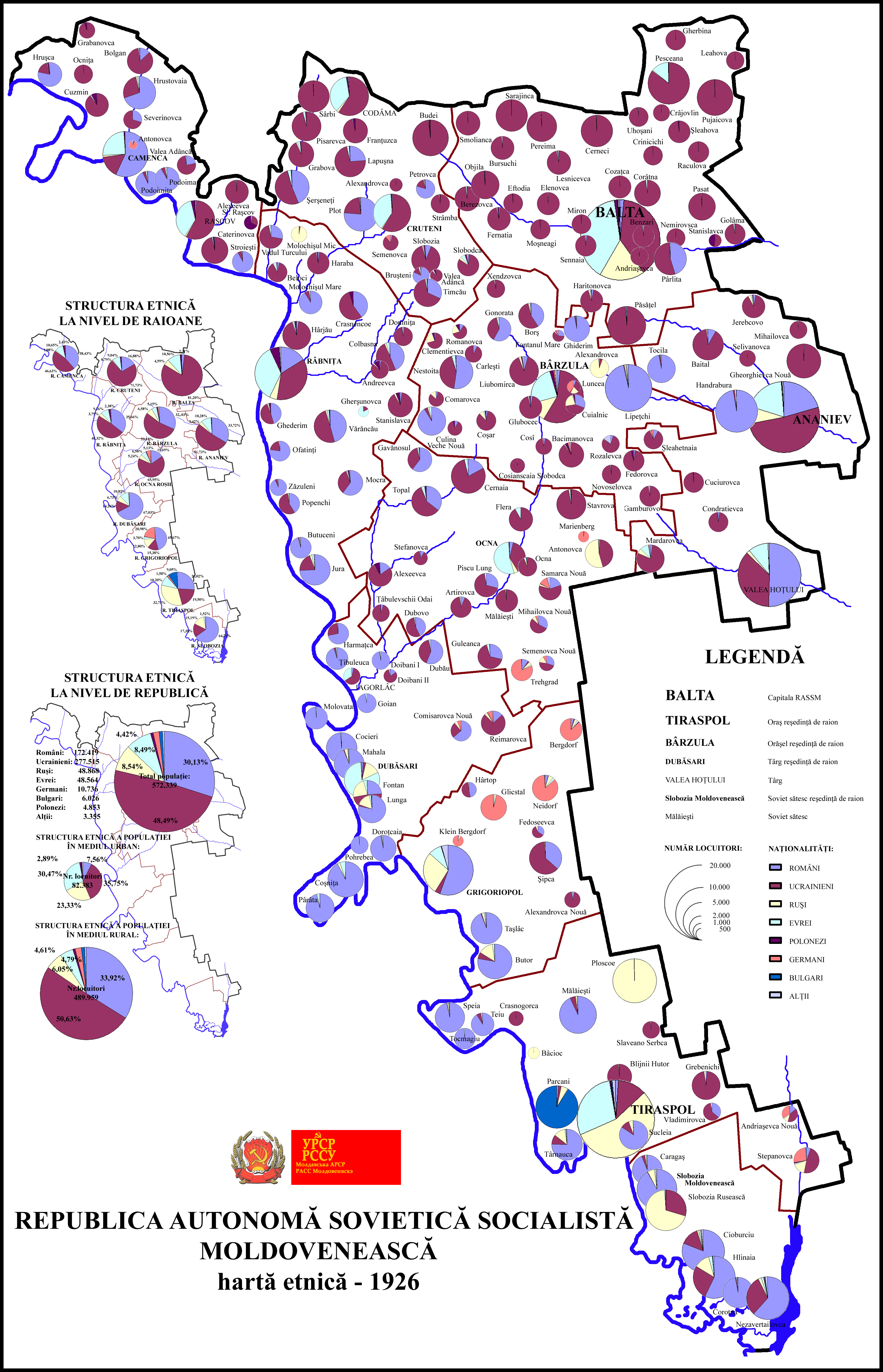
Ethnic composition of MASSR, 1926

In 1940, after the annexation of Bessarabia, the USSR formed the Moldavian SSR from 6 of the 14 districts of the MASSR and most of Bessarabia.

=== World War II ===
Romania controlled (August 19, 1941 – January 29, 1944) the whole "Transnistrian" region between Dniester, Southern Bug rivers and Black Sea coast. The region was divided into 13 județe (counties).

The Moldavian SSR, which was set up by a decision of the Supreme Soviet of the USSR on 2 August 1940, was formed from a part of Bessarabia occupied from Romania on June 28, following the Molotov–Ribbentrop pact, where the majority of the population were Romanian-speakers, and a strip of land on the left bank of the Dniester in the Ukrainian SSR, which was transferred to it in 1940 (the strip being roughly equivalent to the territory of today's Transnistria).

In 1941, after Axis forces invaded Bessarabia in the course of the Second World War, they advanced over the Dniester river. Romania occupied the entire region between the Dniester and Southern Bug rivers, including the city of Odessa, as Transnistria.

The territory — called Governatorate of Transnistria — with an area of 44,000 km2 and a population of 1.2 million inhabitants was divided into 13 counties: Ananiev, Balta, Berzovca, Dubasari, Golta, Jugastru, Movilau, Oceacov, Odessa, Ovidiopol, Ribnita, Tiraspol and Tulcin. There were in this enlarged Transnistria nearly 200,000 Romanian-speaking residents.

The Romanian administration of "Transnistria" attempted to stabilise the situation in the area under Romanian control. It was implemented a process of Romanianization. To this end, it opened all churches, previously closed down by the Soviets. In 1942–1943, 2,200 primary schools were organized in the region, including 1,677 Ukrainian, 311 Romanian, 150 Russian, 70 German and 6 Bulgarian. 117 middle and high schools were opened, including 65 middle schools, 29 technical high schools, and 23 academic high schools. Theaters were opened in Odessa and Tiraspol, as well as several museums, libraries, and cinemas throughout the region. On 7 December 1941, the "University of Odessa" was reopened with 6 faculties – medicine, polytechnical, law, sciences, languages and agricultural engineering.

The Romanians and Moldovans in Ukraine east of the Bug river were calculated by a German census to be nearly 800,000 (probably an excessive number), and were made plans to move them to Transnistria in 1942/43: but nothing was done.

A far more likely figure was that given by Romanian daily in March, 1943. It reported that, as of the summer of 1942, 23,000 Moldavian families had been located in Soviet territory east of the Bug (under German occupation). A group of these had been made to make records of their folk music "in order to preserve proof of the permanence of the Romanian element in the distant East" (Universul, March 15, 1943).

Furthermore, by March 1943 a total of 185,000 Jews had been murdered under the Romanian and German occupation. This figure includes Romanian and Ukrainian Jews deported from Romania and Bessarabia, but also local Jews who were hunted down by the Einsatzgruppen killing squads.

The Soviet Union regained the area in spring of 1944, when the Red Army advanced into the territory driving out the Axis forces. Many thousands of Romanians (ethnic Vlachs of Transnistria) were killed in those months or deported to gulags in the following years

Site	Romanian-era classification / function	Present-day location	Notes	English Wikipedia article
Akhmechetka / Acmecetca	Camp / extermination site	Prybuzhzhya, Mykolaiv Oblast, Ukraine	One of the principal killing camps in Golta County, where thousands of Jews were murdered.	Akhmechetka concentration camp
Ananiev	Ghetto	Ananiv, Odesa Oblast, Ukraine	A ghetto was established after Ananiev became part of Romanian-administered Transnistria in September 1941. About 300 remaining Jews were confined there and were subsequently murdered near Mostovoye while being marched toward Dubăsari.	—
Balanivka / Balanovca	Ghetto / transit site	Balanivka, Vinnytsia Oblast, Ukraine	Established in October 1941 as a ghetto and transit site for Jewish deportees from Bessarabia and Bukovina. About 3,500 Jews were initially confined in roofless cowsheds, and thousands died from cold, malnutrition, disease and poor sanitary conditions.	—
Balta	Ghetto	Balta, Odesa Oblast, Ukraine	A ghetto was established in October 1941 and held local Jews, Jews from elsewhere in Ukraine, and deportees from Bessarabia and Bukovina. About 4,000 Jews were initially confined there.	—
Bershad	Ghetto	Bershad, Vinnytsia Oblast, Ukraine	One of the major ghettos of Romanian-administered Transnistria; it held local Jews and large numbers of deportees from Bessarabia and Bukovina, many of whom suffered from overcrowding, hunger and disease.	—
Bobryk / Bobric	Camp / ghetto	Bobryk, Odesa Oblast, Ukraine	One of the sites used by Romanian authorities to concentrate Jewish deportees in Transnistria before intended expulsion across the Bug River into German-controlled territory.	—
Bogdanovka	Colony / concentration camp	Bohdanivka, Mykolaiv Oblast, Ukraine	Major site of mass murder in Golta County. Tens of thousands of Jews were murdered there between December 1941 and January 1942.	Bogdanovka concentration camp
Bratslav	Ghetto	Bratslav, Vinnytsia Oblast, Ukraine	Ghetto established in September 1941 for local Jews, Jews from the surrounding district and deportees from Bessarabia and Bukovina. Most inmates were transferred to the Pechora concentration camp around the beginning of January 1942.	—
Camenca	Ghetto	Camenca, present-day Moldova	Ghetto in Romanian-administered Transnistria that held local Jews and deportees; as elsewhere in Transnistria, Jews confined in ghettos were subjected to forced labour and severe shortages of food and other necessities.	—
Cicelnic / Chechelnik	Ghetto	Chechelnyk, Vinnytsia Oblast, Ukraine	A barbed-wire-enclosed ghetto held about 1,000 local Jews and survivors from neighbouring communities, followed by more than 1,000 deportees from Bukovina and Bessarabia. Inmates were subjected to forced labour, and about one-third died during a typhus epidemic in the winter of 1941–1942.	—
Domanovka / Domanevca	Camp	Domanivka, Mykolaiv Oblast, Ukraine	Major detention and killing site in Golta County, where Romanian authorities carried out mass murder of Jews.	Domanovka concentration camp
Dubăsari	Ghetto / mass killing site	Dubăsari, present-day Moldova	Romanian authorities established a ghetto consisting of two streets and confined about 2,500 Jews from Dubăsari district there. In September 1941, members of Einsatzkommando 12 began murdering the ghetto's inmates in mass shootings outside the town.	—
Dzhurin	Ghetto	Dzhuryn, Vinnytsia Oblast, Ukraine	Ghetto under Romanian occupation that held local Jews and deportees from Romania, including Jews from Bessarabia and Bukovina.	—
Dzyhivka	Ghetto	Dzygivka, Vinnytsia Oblast, Ukraine	Jews were concentrated in a ghetto shortly after the German occupation in July 1941. After the town became part of Romanian-administered Transnistria, about 100 deportees from Bukovina and Bessarabia were brought there, and inmates were subjected to forced labour.	—
Grosulovo	Internment camp	Velyka Mykhailivka, Odesa Oblast, Ukraine	A camp established in a dilapidated tobacco depot in autumn 1941 initially held local Ukrainian Jews and Jews deported from Bessarabia and Bukovina. In October 1943 hundreds of Jewish and non-Jewish political prisoners were transferred there from Vapniarka.	Grosulovo internment camp
Iampol	Ghetto / deportation transit point	Yampil, Vinnytsia Oblast, Ukraine	One of the crossing points through which Jews deported from Bessarabia and Bukovina entered Transnistria; deportees were subsequently distributed among camps and ghettos in the governorate.	—
Mohyliv-Podilskyi / Mogilev	Ghetto / transit centre	Mohyliv-Podilskyi, Vinnytsia Oblast, Ukraine	One of the principal entry points for Jews deported from Bessarabia and Bukovina and the site of one of the largest ghettos in Transnistria. About 25,000 Bessarabian Jews passed through a transit camp there in 1941.	—
Murafa	Ghetto	Murafa, Vinnytsia Oblast, Ukraine	Ghetto in Romanian-administered Transnistria that became a destination for Jewish deportees, including Jews from Bukovina.	—
Mytky	Camp / ghetto	Vinnytsia Oblast, Ukraine	One of the northern Transnistrian sites designated by Romanian authorities for concentrating Jews before their intended expulsion across the Bug River.	—
Obodivka / Obodovka / Obodovca	Ghetto / transit camp	Obodivka, Vinnytsia Oblast, Ukraine	One of the principal concentration and transit sites used for Jews deported into Transnistria; deportees were confined under extremely poor conditions.	Obodivka internment camp
Olgopol	Ghetto	Olhopil, Vinnytsia Oblast, Ukraine	A ghetto was established for the remaining local Jews and several hundred deportees from Bessarabia and Bukovina. Inmates were subjected to forced labour, hunger and a typhus epidemic.	—
Pechora / Pecioara	Concentration camp	Pechera, Vinnytsia Oblast, Ukraine	One of two sites described by the United States Holocaust Memorial Museum as concentration camps established by Romanian authorities in Transnistria; prisoners died in large numbers from starvation, exposure and disease.	Pechora concentration camp
Golta	Ghetto / forced-labour and internment sites	Pervomaisk, Mykolaiv Oblast, Ukraine	Administrative centre of Golta County, a district containing several major Romanian detention and killing sites, including Bogdanovka, Domanovka and Akhmechetka.	—
Rohizka / Rogozna	Camp / ghetto	Vinnytsia Oblast, Ukraine	One of the northern Transnistrian sites designated by Romanian authorities for concentrating Jews before their intended expulsion across the Bug River.	—
Șargorod	Ghetto	Sharhorod, Vinnytsia Oblast, Ukraine	A major ghetto that held local Jews and thousands of deportees. About 5,000 Jews from Bessarabia and Bukovina were deported to Sharhorod in late 1941, joining approximately 2,000 local Jews.	—
Slobidka	Ghetto / transit camp	Odesa, Odesa Oblast, Ukraine	Romanian authorities confined thousands of Jews in the Slobidka ghetto. In January 1942 it became the principal assembly and transit point for the deportation of Odesa's remaining Jews to other parts of Transnistria.	—
Slivina	Forced-labour camp	Slyvyne, Mykolaiv Oblast, Ukraine	Forced-labour camp established in spring 1943 during German bridge and road construction operations near the Southern Bug. Jews from ghettos elsewhere in Transnistria were transferred there for forced labour.	—
Șpikov	Ghetto	Shpykiv, Vinnytsia Oblast, Ukraine	Ghetto in Romanian-administered Transnistria that held local Jews and deportees; Jews from Shpykiv were among those transferred to the Pechora concentration camp.	—
Tiraspol	Ghetto / transit and forced-labour centre	Tiraspol, present-day Moldova	An important transit point for Jews deported into Transnistria. A small ghetto developed around Jewish craftsmen retained in the city, and several forced-labour centres subsequently operated there.	—
Tomashpil	Ghetto	Tomashpil, Vinnytsia Oblast, Ukraine	Romanian authorities confined the town's Jews in a barbed-wire-enclosed ghetto in December 1941. Inmates lived in severe overcrowding and were used for forced labour, while hunger and infectious disease were widespread.	—
Tulcin	Ghetto	Tulchyn, Vinnytsia Oblast, Ukraine	A ghetto was established in October 1941. On 13 December about 3,000 Jews were deported from Tulcin to the Pechora concentration camp, while a smaller number of skilled workers were initially retained in the town.	—
Vapniarka	Concentration camp	Vapniarka, Vinnytsia Oblast, Ukraine	Concentration camp used primarily for Jewish political prisoners deported from Romania. Hundreds developed lathyrism after prisoners were fed toxic Lathyrus sativus peas.	Vapniarka concentration camp

=== Moldavian SSR ===
The Moldavian SSR became the subject of a systematic policy of Russification. Cyrillic was made the official script for Moldovan. It had an official status in the republic, together with Russian, which was the language of "interethnic communication".

Most industry that was built in the Moldavian SSR was concentrated in Transnistria, while the rest of Moldova had a predominantly agricultural economy. In 1990, Transnistria accounted for 40% of Moldova's GDP and 90% of its electricity production.

The 14th Soviet army had been based there since 1956 and was kept there after the fall of the Soviet Union to safeguard what is probably the biggest weapons stockpile and ammunition depot in Europe, which was set up in Soviet times for possible operations on the Southeastern Theater in the event of World War III. Russia was negotiating with the Republic of Moldova, Transnistria and Ukraine for transit rights to be able to evacuate the military materiel back to Russia. In 1994, the 14th Army headquarters were moved from Moldovan capital Chișinău to Tiraspol.

=== Dissolution of the Soviet Union ===
Mikhail Gorbachev's policy of perestroika in the Soviet Union allowed the political liberalization at the regional level in 1980s. The incomplete democratization was preliminary for the exclusivist nationalism to become the most dynamic political force. Some national minorities opposed these changes in the Moldovan political class of the republic, since during Soviet times, local politics had often been dominated by non-Romanian Moldovans, particularly by those of Russian origin. The language laws — introducing the Latin alphabet for written Moldavian and requiring proficiency in the Moldavian language (essentially—some would say exactly—the Romanian language) for public servants— presented a particularly volatile issue as a great proportion of the non-Romanian population of the Moldovan SSR did not speak Moldovan. The problem of official languages in the Republic of Moldova has become a Gordian knot, being exaggerated and, perhaps, intentionally politicized. This displeasure with the new policies was manifested in a more visible way in Transnistria, where urban centers such as Tiraspol, had a Slavic majority. The scenes of protests against the central government of the republic were more acute here.

According to the census in 1989, the population in Transnistria was 39.9% Moldovan, 28.3% Ukrainian, 25.4% Russian, 1.9% Bulgarian.

== Transnistrian War ==
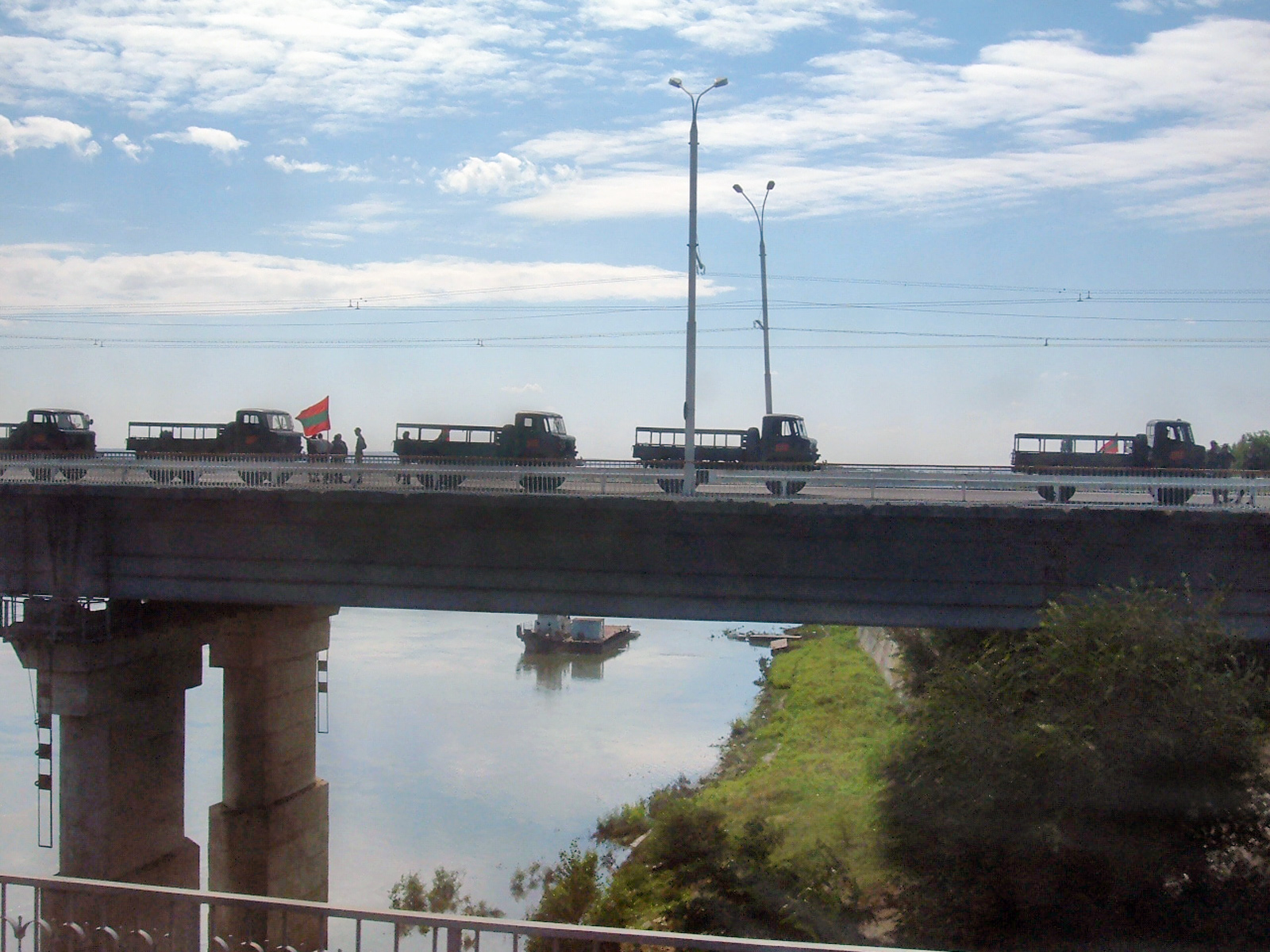
Infantry vehicles on the disputed bridge between Tiraspol and Bender

On 2 September 1990, the Pridnestrovian Moldavian Soviet Socialist Republic was unilaterally proclaimed as a Soviet Republic separate from Moldova by the "Second Congress of the Peoples' Representatives of Pridnestrovie". However, on 22 December, the Soviet President Mikhail Gorbachev signed a decree "regarding the measures that would bring the situation back to normal in the Moldavian SSR". The decision stated that the proclamation of the Pridnestrovian Moldavian SSR was null and void. On 25 August 1991, the Supreme Council of the PMSSR adopted the declaration of independence of the republic. On 27 August 1991, the Moldovan Parliament adopted the Declaration of Independence of the Republic of Moldova, whose territory included Transnistria. The Moldovan Parliament asked the Government of the Soviet Union "to begin negotiations with the Moldovan Government in order to put an end to the illegal occupation of the Republic of Moldova and withdraw Soviet troops from Moldovan territory".

Moldovan forces entered Dubăsari in order to separate Transnistria into two halves, but were stopped by the city's inhabitants, who had blocked the bridge over the Dniester, at Lunga. In an attempt to break through the roadblock, Moldovan forces then opened fire. In the course of the confrontation, three Dubăsari locals, Oleg Geletiuk, Vladimir Gotkas and Valerie Mitsuls, were killed by the Moldovan forces and sixteen people wounded. Line 225: Despite the ceasefire agreement, Russia had continued to provide military, political and economic support to the PMR, thus enabling it not only to survive but to strengthen itself and acquire a certain amount of autonomy from Moldova. In the security zone controlled by the Russian military forces, the Transnistrian government continued to deploy its troops and to manufacture and sell weapons in breach of the agreement of 21 July 1992. In February 2003, the USA and the European Union imposed visa restrictions against the Transnistrian leadership.

Although only 2,600 peacekeeping troops of the Russian 14th Army remain in the operational group, their presence has been used by Russia as an instrument of influence over the region.

The agreement to withdraw all Russian forces was signed in 1994, but while the number of troops decreased, an immense stockpile of ammunition and equipment remained. The arsenal of the former 14th Army consists of 49,476 firearms, 805 artillery guns, 4,000 cars, and 655 units of various military equipment, which is enough to arm four rifle divisions.

The OSCE is trying to facilitate a negotiated settlement and has had an observer mission in place for several years. The Russian army was still stationed in Moldovan territory in breach of the undertakings to withdraw them completely given by Russia at the OSCE summits in 1999 and 2001.

== The deadlock ==
=== Aftermath of the war ===
Despite the ceasefire agreement, Russia had continued to provide military, political and economic support to the PMR, thus enabling it not only to survive but to strengthen itself and acquire a certain amount of autonomy from Moldova. General Aleksandr Lebed, the commander of the Russian Operational Group (the former Russian 14th Army) since June 1992, who acted as a Transnistrian politician, said many times that his army was able to reach Bucharest in two hours. In the security zone controlled by the Russian military forces, the Transnistrian government continued to deploy its troops and to manufacture and sell weapons in breach of the agreement of 21 July 1992. In February 2003, the USA and the European Union imposed visa restrictions against the Transnistrian leadership.

Only 2,600 peacekeeping troops of the Russian 14th Army remain in the operational group.

The agreement to withdraw all Russian forces was signed in 1994, but while the number of troops decreased, an immense stockpile of ammunition and equipment remained. The arsenal of the former 14th Army consists of 49,476 firearms, 805 artillery guns, 4,000 cars, and 655 units of various military equipment, which is enough to arm four rifle divisions.

The OSCE is trying to facilitate a negotiated settlement and has had an observer mission in place for several years. The Russian army was still stationed in Transnistrian territory in breach of the undertakings to withdraw them completely given by Russia at the OSCE summits in 1999 and 2001.

=== 1997 Moscow memorandum on the "common state" ===
On 8 May 1997 – with the mediation of the Russian Federation, Ukraine and the OSCE Mission in Moldova – the Moldovan President Petru Lucinschi and the president of the PMR Igor Smirnov, signed, in Moscow, the "Memorandum on the principles of normalizations of the relations between the Republic of Moldova and Transdniestria" also known as the 1997 Moscow memorandum or the Primakov memorandum.

In compliance with the final clause of the memorandum, the relations between the Republic of Moldova and Transdniestria shall be developed within the framework of a common state (the 2 states function as a confederation), within the borders of Soviet Moldova. The Russian Federation and Ukraine stated their readiness to become guarantors of the Transdnestrian status observance, as well as of the Memorandum's provisions. Chișinău and Tiraspol have decided to sustain the establishment of legal and state relations: the mutual decision coordination, inclusively regarding prerogatives, delimitation and delegation, the safeguard of mutual security, and Transnistrian participation in the process of accomplishment of the foreign policy of the Republic of Moldova. At the same time, Transdniestria gained the right, subject to mutual agreement, to independently establish and maintain international connections in such fields as economy, science, technologies and culture. The Memorandum provisions had widely diverging legal and political interpretations in Chișinău and Tiraspol.

=== The Kozak Memorandum ===
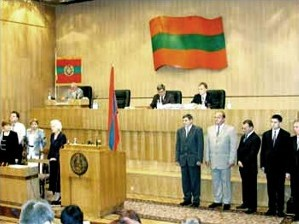
The Parliament (and flag) of Transnistria

In July 2002, OSCE, Russian, and Ukrainian mediators approved a document setting forth a blueprint for reuniting Moldova under a federal system. However, the fundamental disagreements over the division of powers remained, which rendered the settlement elusive.

In mid-November 2003, Russia unexpectedly provided a much more detailed memorandum proposing a united asymmetric federal Moldavian state with an attached key proposal to locate a Russian military base on Moldavian soil for the next 20 years. First published in Russian on the website of Transnistria's Ministry of Foreign Affairs, the text was promoted by a Russian politician Dmitry Kozak, known to be a close ally of President Vladimir Putin and one of the key figures in his presidential team. The memorandum presented an end to the previous Moscow policy, which assumed that the region would have equal status in federation with the rest of the country.

It was proposed that the competences of government of the federal Moldova would be divided into three categories: those of the federation, those of individual subjects and those of joint competences. The plan presented several issues risking to cause blockage in policy-making. A lower house, elected by proportional representation, would pass legislation by simple majority. All laws would also need the assent of the senate, however, whose representation would be highly disproportionate with respect to population figures: 13 senators elected by the federal lower house, nine by Transnistria and four by Gagauzia. According to the 1989 census, Transnistria had 14% and Gagauzia 3.5% of Moldova's total population. By this plan, Transnistria and Gaugazia would be an outright blocking minority.

Large demonstrations against the Kozak memorandum took place in Chișinău in the days following the publication of the Russian proposal. Moldova's leadership declined to sign memorandum without the coordination with the European organizations. A visit by President Putin to Moldova was cancelled. Later in 2005, President Vladimir Voronin made a statement rejecting the 2003 Kozak memorandum because of contradiction with the Moldovan constitution which defines Moldova as a neutral state and could not allow any foreign troops on its soil, while the country cannot join military alliances. Moldova and the Kozak memorandum was a key issue at the OSCE ministerial meeting in Maastricht in December 2003, and disagreement between Russia on the one hand, and the EU and the US on the other on Moldova, was one of the principal reasons why a final joint declaration was not adopted after the meeting.

=== 2004 crisis ===
In the summer of 2004, a crisis erupted over the issue of Romanian-language schools in Transnistria. It led to a breakdown in negotiations and economic retaliations by both sides. The issue was resolved by compromise: The PMR government gave the schools autonomy, and the schools formalized their registration with the PMR Ministry of Education.

=== Ukraine-sponsored talks ===
In May 2005, the Ukrainian government of Viktor Yushchenko proposed a seven-point plan by which the separation of Transnistria and Moldova would be settled through a negotiated settlement and free elections. Under the plan, Transnistria would remain an autonomous region of Moldova. The United States, the EU and the PMR itself expressed some level of agreement with the project.

In July, Ukraine opened five new customs posts on the PMR-Ukraine border. The posts, staffed by both Moldovan and Ukrainian officials, are intended to reduce the hitherto high incidence of smuggling between the breakaway state and its neighbors.

=== 5+2 negotiation format ===
Beginning in 2005, multilateral talks were held on the subject of Transnistria. The 5+2 in the name refer to Moldova, Transnistria, Ukraine, Organization for Security and Co-operation in Europe and Russia, plus the European Union and the United States as external observers.

The talks proved to be a failure. They restarted in February 2011, in Vienna.

Tiraspol has raised the restoration of its ability to export Transnistrian goods without supervision by Moldova as a precondition. At present, Chisinau allows companies in Transnistria to export goods subject to customs formalities in Chisinau, charging only a token fee for doing so. This procedure was introduced under EU influence, in order to ensure the transparency of commercial operations. At the same time, Tiraspol has openly declared that it will negotiate with Moldova only in order to "normalise" bilateral relations and not to reintegrate Transnistria with Moldova. The tactic employed by Tiraspol (and Russia, which supports it) is to make a mere formal concession (agreement to enter formal negotiations) in exchange for extracting a real concession from Moldova (granting Transnistria the right to conduct foreign economic relations).

In April 2011 Russia agreed theoretically to create an autonomous region of Transnistria inside the Republic of Moldova, but there were many other problems to be solved in the talks.

=== Russian invasion of Ukraine ===
After the annexation of the Crimea by the Russian Federation in March 2014, the head of the Transnistrian parliament asked to join Russia.

On April 26, 2022, authorities from the Transnistria region said two transmitting antennas broadcasting Russian radio programs at Grigoriopol transmitter broadcasting facility near the town of Maiac in the Grigoriopol District near the Ukrainian border had been blown up and the previous evening, the premises of the Transnistrian state security service had been attacked. Observers feared targeted provocations to give Russia an excuse to intervene in Moldova. The Russian army has a military base and a large ammunition dump in the region. Russia has about 1,500 soldiers stationed in breakaway Transnistria. They are officially there as peacekeepers.

=== 2025 Moldovan energy crisis ===
Transnistria stopped receiving natural gas supplies from Russia on 31 December 2024, at 19:50 EET (17:50 UTC), as a result of the expiration of Russia's five-year gas transit deal with Ukraine. This kickstarted a nationwide energy crisis in Moldova; heating, hot water and gas (except for cooking in cities) were completely cut off in Transnistria. Three people died and several more were injured due to carbon monoxide poisoning, with cases of hypothermia also being reported.

As per an agreement reached in August 2025 the flow of gas to Transnistria via the rest of Moldova continued until 31 March 2026. From February 2025, limited supplies resumed under an arrangement in which gas bought on the European market was delivered to the Moldovan border by the Hungarian company MET and transported to the region by Moldovagaz, with payment made through a Dubai-registered company using funds from a Russian loan. Supplies were capped at levels too low to sustain the region's heavy industry. In 2025 Transnistria's economy contracted by about 18% and its industrial output fell by more than 30%, and the authorities in Tiraspol declared repeated states of economic emergency. In March 2026 supplies fell to critical levels: the Cuciurgan power station switched to coal, and large enterprises including the Moldova Steel Works and Tirotex were cut off from gas. Moldova's energy regulator repeatedly extended Moldovagaz's mandate as the region's supplier, first to July 2026 and then to the end of 2026, and in 2026 moved to extend it to May 2027. According to the Romanian newspaper Cotidianul, public-sector salaries in the region were paid in two instalments from March 2026.

Moldova has meanwhile drawn the region into its fiscal system. Transnistrian companies have paid Moldovan customs duties since January 2024, and in 2026 Moldova adopted a plan to phase in VAT and excise duties on goods imported into the region and to eliminate all tax exemptions for Transnistrian businesses by 2030, with part of the revenue going to a "Convergence Fund" for social and infrastructure projects in the region. Moldova described the policy as "same country – same taxes", while Transnistrian officials called it economic pressure and extortion and described the fund as a "looting fund". By the first half of 2026, 76.9% of the region's exports went to the European Union.

Political talks resumed on 26 February 2026 after a pause of more than 15 months, when Moldova's and Transnistria's political representatives, Valeriu Chiveri and Vitaly Ignatiev, met at the OSCE office in Tiraspol. A second round on 16 April ended without progress. Russia called for reviving the 5+2 format, which the speaker of Moldova's parliament declared "dead". Moldova also took measures against figures connected with the region's administration and the Russian military presence: in February 2026 President Maia Sandu revoked the Moldovan citizenship of nine current and former Transnistrian officials, including former interior minister Ruslan Mova, and in April Moldova declared the command of the Operational Group of Russian Forces persona non grata. Russia's foreign ministry said it was too early to discuss withdrawing its troops.

On 15 May 2026, Russian President Vladimir Putin signed a decree allowing Transnistria's roughly 350,000 residents to obtain Russian citizenship without the usual residency, language and history requirements; about half already held Russian citizenship. Transnistria's authorities welcomed the move as a protective measure, while Sandu suggested Russia might use it to recruit soldiers for its war against Ukraine. The region's presidential election is scheduled for 13 December 2026; Vadim Krasnoselsky is barred by term limits from standing again, making it the first contest without an incumbent since 2016.

== See also ==
- War of Transnistria
- Disputed status of Transnistria
- Transnistrian border customs issues
- 2006 Tiraspol bombings
- Crime in Transnistria
- International recognition of Transnistria
- Republic of Moldova
