= IEAC =

IEAC may refer to:

- Institute for Euro-Atlantic Cooperation
- Independent estimate at completion, used in earned value management
