= Borys Tarasyuk =

Ukrainian politician

- Борис Тарасюк
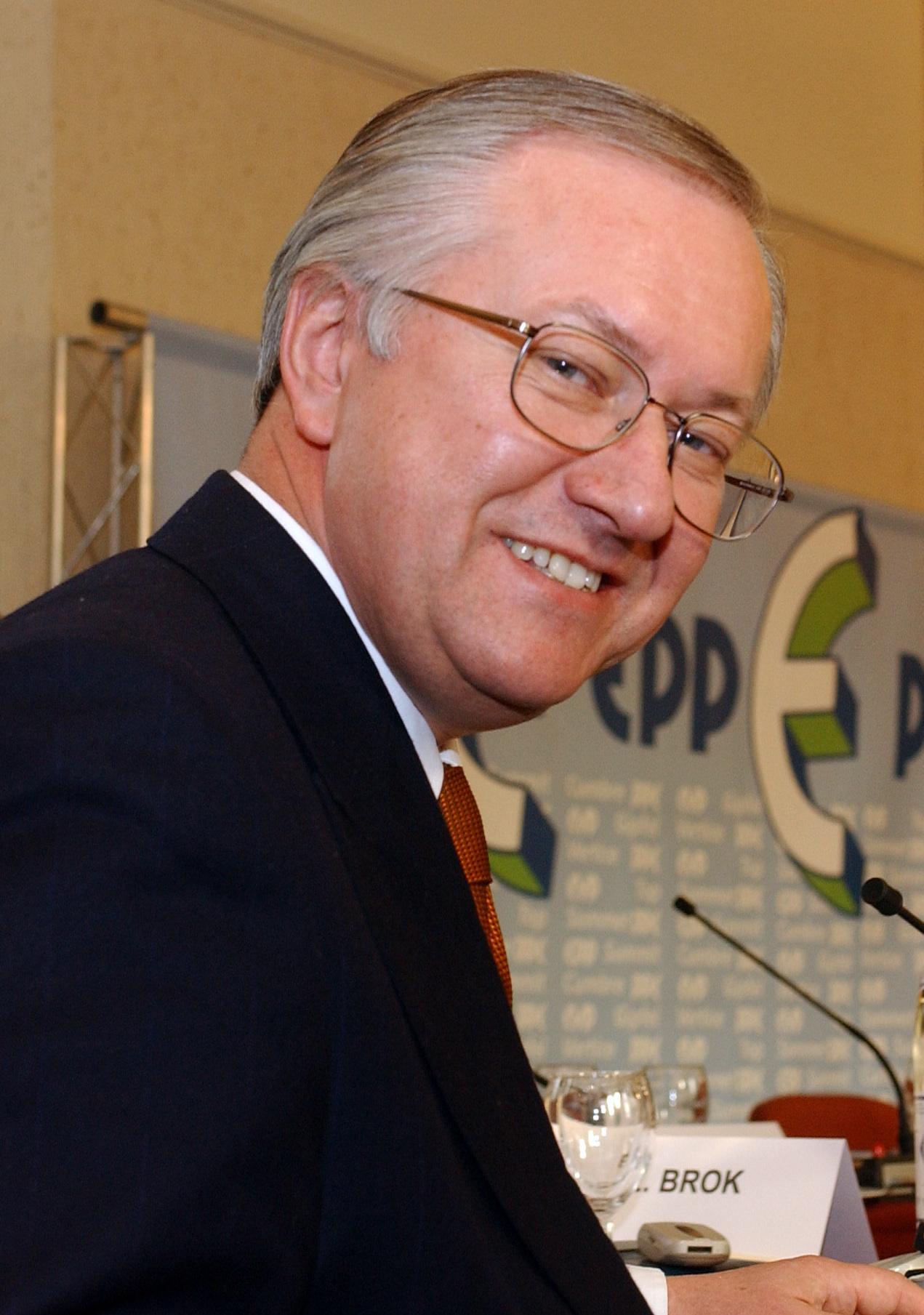
- Tarasyuk in 2004

Minister for Foreign Affairs
- In office 17 April 1998 – 29 September 2000
- Preceded by: Hennadiy Udovenko
- Succeeded by: Anatoliy Zlenko
- In office 4 February 2005 – 30 January 2007
- Preceded by: Kostiantyn Hryshchenko
- Succeeded by: Volodymyr Ohryzko

Personal details
- Born: Borys Ivanovych Tarasyuk; 1 January 1949 (age 77) Dzerzhynsk, Zhytomyr Oblast, Ukrainian SSR, Soviet Union
- Party: Batkivshchina (2013–); People's Movement of Ukraine (former Chairman)

Borys Ivanovych Tarasyuk (Ukrainian: Борис Іванович Тарасюк; born 1 January 1949) is a Ukrainian politician who twice served as the Minister for Foreign Affairs of Ukraine and a former MP who is since December 2019 Ukraine's permanent representative to the Council of Europe.

== Early life and education ==
Tarasyuk studied international relations and international law at National Taras Shevchenko University of Kyiv, and graduated in 1975. Besides Ukrainian, he is fluent in English, French and Russian. As of 2012, Tarasyuk is a sitting member of the International Honorary Council of the European Academy of Diplomacy. He is a Senior Network Member at the European Leadership Network (ELN).

== Career as foreign minister ==
Tarasyuk served as deputy of foreign minister from 9 March 1992 until 16 September 1995. In 1995 – 1998 he was ambassador in Belgium, Luxembourg, Netherlands and Ukraine representative in NATO. He became foreign minister for the first time from 17 April 1998 until 29 September 2000. He later broke with President Leonid Kuchma, and became a foreign relations adviser to Viktor Yushchenko, the main opposition candidate in the 2004 presidential elections. After Ukraine's Orange Revolution, Tarasyuk became foreign minister again on 4 February 2005, and served in the Cabinets of Yulia Tymoshenko, Yuriy Yekhanurov, and Viktor Yanukovych. Tarasyuk favors Ukrainian integration with the European Union.

Tarasyuk was formally dismissed by the Verkhovna Rada on 1 December 2006. He disputed this dismissal in Kyiv Shevchenkivskyi District court, and on 5 December parliament's decision was reversed on the grounds that it violated Ukrainian law. On the same day, Yushchenko issued a decree that Tarasyuk must keep his job.

Despite this court order and presidential decree, he was not allowed to enter cabinet meetings and this caused political conflict based on interpretations of amendments to Constitution. On 30 January 2007 Tarasyuk announced his resignation. In 2009, he served as the Chairman of the Committee of the Verkhovna Rada on issues of European integration.

== Political career since his ministerial post ==
Tarasyuk was placed at number 7 on the electoral list of Batkivshchina during the 2012 Ukrainian parliamentary election. He was elected into parliament. A part of People’s Movement of Ukraine, including Tarasyuk, merged (the rest of this party had merged with Ukrainian People's Party in May 2013) into Batkivshchina on 15 June 2013.

In the 2014 Ukrainian parliamentary election he was again re-elected into parliament; this time after placing 12th on the electoral list of Batkivshchina.

Tarasyuk did not participate in the 2019 Ukrainian parliamentary election.

On 24 December 2019 President Volodymyr Zelenskyy appointed Tarasyuk as Ukraine's permanent representative to the Council of Europe.

== Institute for Euro-Atlantic Cooperation ==
Borys Tarasyuk is the founder of the Institute for Euro-Atlantic Cooperation (IEAC), a political action committee established to campaign for NATO- and European Union memberships in Ukraine. The group is funded by Western donations and is open about its goals. The IEAC' logo juxtaposes the flag of Ukraine with the logos of NATO and the European Union. Polls cited by Tarasyuk showed that only between 18% and 22% of Ukraine's population supported NATO-membership in 2007. The percentage has increased to 47% by 2014.

The Institute for Euro-Atlantic Cooperation has influenced Ukraine state policy in the past. For example, a report produced by the Institute titled Trilateral Plan for Solving the Transnistrian Issue recommended changes to the customs regime relating to Transnistria. Less than five weeks after the report's publication, the recommendations were implement and signed into law. Ukraine-Transnistria border customs conflict followed on 3 March 2006. The Organization for Security and Co-operation in Europe (OSCE), the European Union, and the United States backed the legislation, while Russia opposed it.

== Academic degrees and awards ==
- 2005 State Order "For Merits", I Grade
- 2002 Doctor Honoris Causa of the Ivan Franko National University of Lviv
- 1999 State Order "For Merits", II Grade
- 1996 State Order "For Merits", III Grade
- 1992 Diplomatic Rank of the Ambassador Extraordinary and Plenipotentiary

Borys Tarasyuk has been decorated with highest state awards of Argentina, Brazil, France, Lithuania, Portugal, Sweden and Venezuela.
