= Institute for Euro-Atlantic Cooperation =

The Institute for Euro-Atlantic Cooperation is a political action committee based in Ukraine. It was founded by Borys Tarasyuk, who twice served as foreign minister of Ukraine, for the stated purpose of campaigning for NATO and European Union membership of Ukraine. The group is funded by Western donations and is open about its goals. The IEAC' logo juxtaposes the flag of Ukraine with the logos of NATO and the European Union.

The Institute for Euro-Atlantic Cooperation has influenced Ukraine state policy in the past. For example, a report produced by the Institute titled Trilateral Plan for Solving the Transnistrian Issue recommended changes to the customs regime relating to Transnistria. Less than five weeks after the report's publication, the recommendations were implement and signed into law. Ukraine-Transnistria border customs conflict followed on March 3, 2006.

The OSCE, the European Union, and the United States backed the legislation, while the Russian Federation and pro-Russian Party of Regions of Ukraine opposed it.

== See also ==
- Dollar diplomacy
- Orange Revolution
