= Elena Bomeshko =

Transnistrian politician (born 1950)

Elena Vasilievna Bomeshko (Note: Russian: Елена Васильевна Бомешко) (born 10 February 1950) is a Transnistrian politician, who served as minister of education from 25 July 2000 to 16 January 2007.

== Biography ==
Elena Vasilievna Bomeshko was born on 10 February 1950 in the village of Vatic, part of the Orhei District in the-then Moldavian SSR. From 1966–71, Bomeshko studied at the Chisinau State University (now the Moldova State University), where she graduated with honors in the field of physical chemistry, gaining a qualification as a teacher of chemistry. Additionally, from 1973–76, she studied at a graduate school, graduating with a degree as a Candidate of Sciences.

As minister of education, Elena Bomeshko supported a policy discriminating against school-children using the Romanian alphabet and supported the promotion of a separate Moldavian language written in the Cyrillic script. By July 2004, 4 of the 6 schools in the country teaching the Romanian alphabet were closed.

According to her defenders, she has merely done her job of upholding the Transnistrian legislation. It follows that since Moldova does not recognize Transnistria, nor the validity of Transnistria's own legislation, in the eyes of Moldova, Bomeshko is failing to obey Moldova's laws by following Transnistria's.

In 2004, she announced the closure of some Romanian-language schools using the Latin alphabet. Amid international criticism, the decision was later reversed.

In 2007, Bomeshko was replaced as minister of education by Maria Rafailovna Pashchenko. In January 2009, as advisor to the president, she pleaded in favor of state commissioning in education. In 2010, she announced a new monument in honor of the soldiers who lost their lives for the country. This move was criticised, however, as two-thirds of Transnistria's over 450 monuments are in need of renovation.

== See also ==
- Romanian-language schools in Transnistria
- Elena Chernenko (politician)
