= Elena Chernenko (politician) =

Transnistrian politician (born 1957)

Elena Yegorovna Chernenko (Russian: Елена Егоровна Черненко; born 17 April 1957) is a Transnistrian politician who was the Minister of Economy of the Pridnestrovian Moldavian Republic (PMR) from 2000 to 2011. In the Ukraine-Transnistria border customs conflict she took one of the leading roles among the country's ministers.

She is a close ally of former Minister of Education Elena Bomeshko, another (former) female member of president Igor Smirnov's cabinet.

== Biography ==
Elena Cernenko was born on April 17, 1957, in the village of Fokino in the Bryansk region (today in the Russian Federation), in a family of Russian nationality. In 1975 she began working as an accountant and then chief accountant at the Tiraspol Brick Factory. She graduated from the Odesa National Economics University in Odesa in 1981, obtaining the qualification of an economist.

In 1986 she became the chief accountant at the "Moldavizolit" Plastic Products Factory in Tiraspol, then in 1989 she became a director of economic affairs at the Tiraspol Brick Factory. Since 1992 she has been working as Chief Accountant and Financial Director at the Tiraspol Mixed Italian-Transnistrian enterprise in Tiraspol, which manufactures synthetic footwear and molding machines.

In August 2000, Elena Chernenko was appointed as the Minister of Economy of the self-proclaimed Pridnestrovian Moldavian Republic, being reconfirmed in January 2007. In this role, she was engaged in attracting foreign investments and privatizating Transnistrian state enterprises. She played an important role in resolving the customs conflict between Transnistria and Ukraine.

She is married and has two daughters.
