= Dzygivka =

Village in Vinnytsia Oblast, Ukraine

Dzygivka Дзиґівка
- Village
- Location within Vinnytsia Oblast Location within Ukraine
- Coordinates: 48°21′0″N 28°19′12″E
- Country: Ukraine
- Oblast: Vinnytsia Oblast
- Raion: Mohyliv-Podilskyi Raion
- Hromada: Yampil urban hromada
- First mentioned: 1500

Area
  - Total: 8.196 km^{2} (3.164 sq mi)

Population (2001 Census)
  - Total: 4,132
  - Density: 504.15/km^{2} (1,305.7/sq mi)
- Time zone: UTC+2 (EET)
  - Summer (DST): UTC+3 (EEST)
- Postal code: 24531
- Area code: +380 4352

Dzygivka (Ukrainian: Дзиґівка), formerly known as Dzyhivka (Ukrainian: Дзигівка), is one of the oldest villages in central Ukraine, of Mohyliv-Podilskyi Raion, Vinnytsia Oblast. It is located in the historical region of Podolia, on the Korytna Stream that flows into the Rusava River, a tributary of the Dniester River.

== History ==
=== Ancient history ===
Human inhabitants have lived in the region since at least the Neolithic period, with Bug-Dniester culture and Cucuteni-Trypillian culture archeological settlements found in the Yampіlsky Raion. During the Great Migration Period, many nationalities passed through or settled in the region, leaving numerous traces in archaeological remains, including the Cuman people, Kipchak people, Pechenegs, Polans, and Korchak culture. The main language was Proto-Slavic.

Nestor in the Primary Chronicle mentions Slavic tribes, the Tivertsi and Ulichs along the Dniester. The Avars invaded in the 7th century. Prince Oleg of Kiev, extended his rule over this territory known as the ponizie, or "lowlands." In the 13th century, the Mongols plundered Ponizie; Algirdas, prince of the Grand Duchy of Lithuania, freed it from their rule following his victory against the Golden Horde in the Battle of Blue Waters of 1362, annexing it to his own territories under the name of Podolia, which means ponizie, and Polish colonization began in the 14th century.

The settlement of Dzygivka is mentioned by name as early as 1500, and was part of the Bratslav Voivodeship. At the end of the 16th century, it was acquired by Jan Zamoyski, Great Crown Chancellor and Grand Crown Hetman.

In 1787, King Stanisław August Poniatowski of the Polish–Lithuanian Commonwealth officially proclaimed it as a market town. establishing legal merchant rights and property rights. In 1795, when Yampil was incorporated into the Land of Rus, it remained part of Yampolskiy uyezd under the Podolia Governorate. In 1914, the largest landowner of the Podolia Governorate was Salomea Jaroszyńska z Jaroszynki in Dzygówka (Ярошинская Саломия Станиславовна 4651 дес., м. Дзыговка).

=== Jewish history ===
In 1787, as an official market town, Dzygivka attracted a large Jewish population. In 1871 approximately half of the population was Jewish. In 1853 there was one synagogue, in 1889 there were three synagogues, and in the early 1900s there were five synagogues, with Jewish people working at the bank, at the medical facility, and running the factories. There were approximately fifty Jewish owned registered businesses. In November 1905 there was a pogrom in a wave of Anti-Jewish pogroms in the Russian Empire, and Jewish persecution continued. By 1917, before the Russian Revolution, most Jewish businesses were destroyed. In 1923, the Jewish population was 1,561.

=== World War II and the Holocaust ===
Right before World War II, the Jewish population was approximately twelve percent of the population.

In 1941, the village was occupied by the Romanian Armed Forces and became part of Transnistria. A work camp was established and 100 Jews from Romania were brought in, with many locals being sent to other work camps. In the spring of 1944, the village was released from occupation, and the Jewish exodus began to major cities and to other countries. By 1998, only 12 elderly residents remained.

Following the Axis invasion of the Soviet Union, Dzygivka was occupied by Romanian forces in 1941 and incorporated into the Romanian-administered Transnistria Governorate. Romanian authorities established a ghetto in Dzygivka, variously recorded in wartime and postwar sources as Dzygovka, Dzigovka or Zhikovka. The ghetto existed from 30 August 1941 until 18 March 1944.

The ghetto formed part of the extensive system of camps and ghettos created by Romanian authorities throughout Transnistria. Local Jews were confined alongside Jews deported by the Romanian government from Bessarabia, Bukovina and other Romanian territories. Romanian authorities established approximately 150 such ghettos and camps in Transnistria, where Jews were subjected to forced labour and suffered from severe shortages of food, inadequate shelter, disease and abuse.

Approximately 100 Jewish deportees from Romania were brought to Dzygivka, while Jews from the local community were also sent to forced-labour sites elsewhere in Transnistria. As elsewhere in Romanian-occupied Transnistria, Jews confined in ghettos were generally required to perform forced labour. Tens of thousands throughout the governorate died from starvation, exposure, disease and maltreatment, while others were murdered in mass shootings. Romanian authorities and local auxiliary forces were responsible for the deaths of an estimated 280,000 to 380,000 Jews in Transnistria during the Holocaust.

As the Red Army advanced westward in early 1944, Romanian forces withdrew from Transnistria. The Dzygivka ghetto ceased to exist on 18 March 1944. The area subsequently came under Soviet control. The destruction and displacement of the wartime period substantially reduced Dzygivka's centuries-old Jewish community, and after the war many of the remaining Jews moved to larger cities or emigrated.

=== Modern history ===
Until 1916, ruled by the Tzar as part of the Tsardom of Russia and the Russian Empire, constantly challenged by the Zaporozhian Cossacks

1917 - Russian Revolution

1918 - Russian Civil War begins

1919–1920 Controlled by Ukrainian People's Republic during Russian Civil War

1921 Ukrainian War of Independence establishes territory boundaries

1922 Russian Civil War ends under the control of the Red Army

1922–1941 Governed by the Communist Party of the Soviet Union in the USSR

1928–1933 Collectivization in the Ukrainian SSR, kolhoz implemented by Joseph Stalin

1932–1933 Holodomor famine under the leadership of Joseph Stalin, (Ukrainian: Голодомор)

1938 Verkhovna Rada of Ukraine is established as its parliament in the Ukrainian Soviet Socialist Republic of the USSR

1941–1944 Occupied by the Romanian Armed Forces during World War II

Spring of 1944 Brief occupation by the Wehrmacht of the German Army during the Eastern Front (World War II)

1944 Soviet Armed Forces occupied Vinnytsia

1945 End of World War II

1945–1991 Governed by the Soviet Union during the Cold War

1990 Declaration of State Sovereignty of Ukraine

1991 Declaration of Independence of Ukraine joining the Commonwealth of Independent States

1996 The adoption of Constitution of Ukraine creates a Semi-presidential system

2004–2005 Orange Revolution

2007 Ukrainian political crisis

2007 Verkhovna Rada holds new elections

On 19 September 2024, the Verkhovna Rada voted to change the spelling of Dzyhivka to Dzygivka.

== Places of interest ==
=== World War II Memorial ===
The citizens of Dzygivka erected a memorial to the Fallen Soldiers who did not return from World War II. Dedicated in 1965, the memorial consists of a raised platform and a statue surrounded by three stone slabs. The central figure of mother and child represents thousands of mothers and children left behind in the village. The name of each villager who did not return home from the war is listed alphabetically on the slabs.

=== Dniester River Basin ===
Dzygivka is part of the Dniester River Basin, which encompasses 7 oblasts of Ukraine and half of the territory of Moldova and includes a population of approximately 8 million people. Moldova, Transnistria and Ukraine are working in a trans-boundary cooperation towards sustainable management of the Dniester River Basin. The United Nations Environment Programme is creating a pilot infrastructure for river basin management to address pollution and illegal logging along the river banks.

=== Jewish Cemetery ===
In the 19th century, Italian stone craftsmen were working together with Jewish stonemasons to create tombstones for the large Jewish cemetery in Dzygivka. Their work can be found in Jewish, Catholic, and Christian cemeteries in the surrounding Podolia region.

== Village life ==
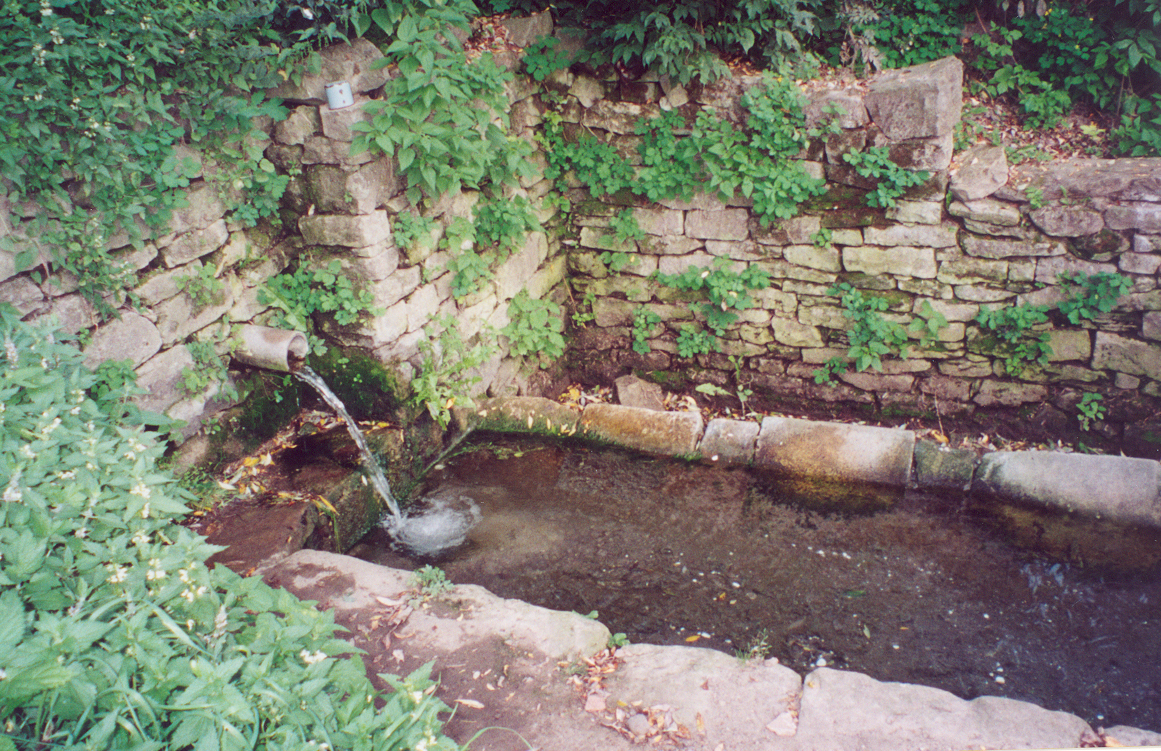
Shypit

A shypit (an underground water source that runs constantly) is the only source of clean running water for villagers. It is similar to a well, consisting of a large metal pipe drilled directly into a hill that taps into an underground natural water source. Very cold water runs constantly and pools at the base. There are several shypits scattered throughout the village, serving as a gathering place and as a rest stop for traveling villagers. Each shypit serves dozens of houses, and residents use buckets to carry drinking water back to their homes. As a common practice, a small container is left at the shypit as a courtesy for weary travelers and for filling jugs with small openings.

The stones at the base serve two functions. On one side (closest to the viewer), the stones are set level, so you can walk up to the pipe, set your bucket on the large stone directly below, and fill your bucket with water. On the opposite side (closest to the wall), the stones are set angled into the water. Each large angled stone serves as an individual laundry station. Saturday has traditionally been laundry day. Women get up very early in the morning to get the best stones closest to the water source. Those who sleep late, go further down the line, where the water is not as clean, because of the runoff from the person upstream. In the summer, when the days are long, this process can start as early as Friday afternoon in an effort to beat the crowd. This event serves as a place to catch up on local news and to discuss important matters.

== Vegetation ==
The village is filled with lush vegetation. The fields are surrounded by tall Acacia trees, and the roads are lines with a variety of shrubbery and vines. Roots, stems, leaves, and berries, are used to create local medicinal potions for all kinds of ailments.

== Notable people from Dzygivka ==
- Stanislav Raiko 1873-1937. Administrator of a Spanish parish in Dzygivka from 1922 until 1928.
- Theodore N. Beckman 1895-1973. Born September 3. Marketing scholar and author. A member of the marketing faculty at Ohio State University for over 50 years.
- Daniil Shamura (Даниил Игнатьевич Шамура) 1918-1997. Decorated War Hero during World War II and Hero of the Soviet Union, buried in Yampil.
- Arkadiy Varshavskiy, (Аркадий Иосифович Варшавский) born October 2, 1938. Oral surgeon, professor, author of over 100 published medical articles. Lives in Moscow, Russia
- Sergei Artemovich Lutsk, (Сергей Артемович Луцкий) Born October 31, 1945. Editor, award-winning author. Currently lives in Bolshetarhovo Village, (Nizhnevartovsk district), Siberia.
- Michael (Misha) Gorban, born in 1956. Painter, the youngest artist to display his work at the Hermitage Museum. Currently lives in Petach Tikva, near Tel Aviv, Israel.
- Zelik Balaban, June 11, 1883 - June 3, 1949. Jewish author.
