= Romanian-language schools in Transnistria =

Schools teaching in the Romanian language in Transnistria

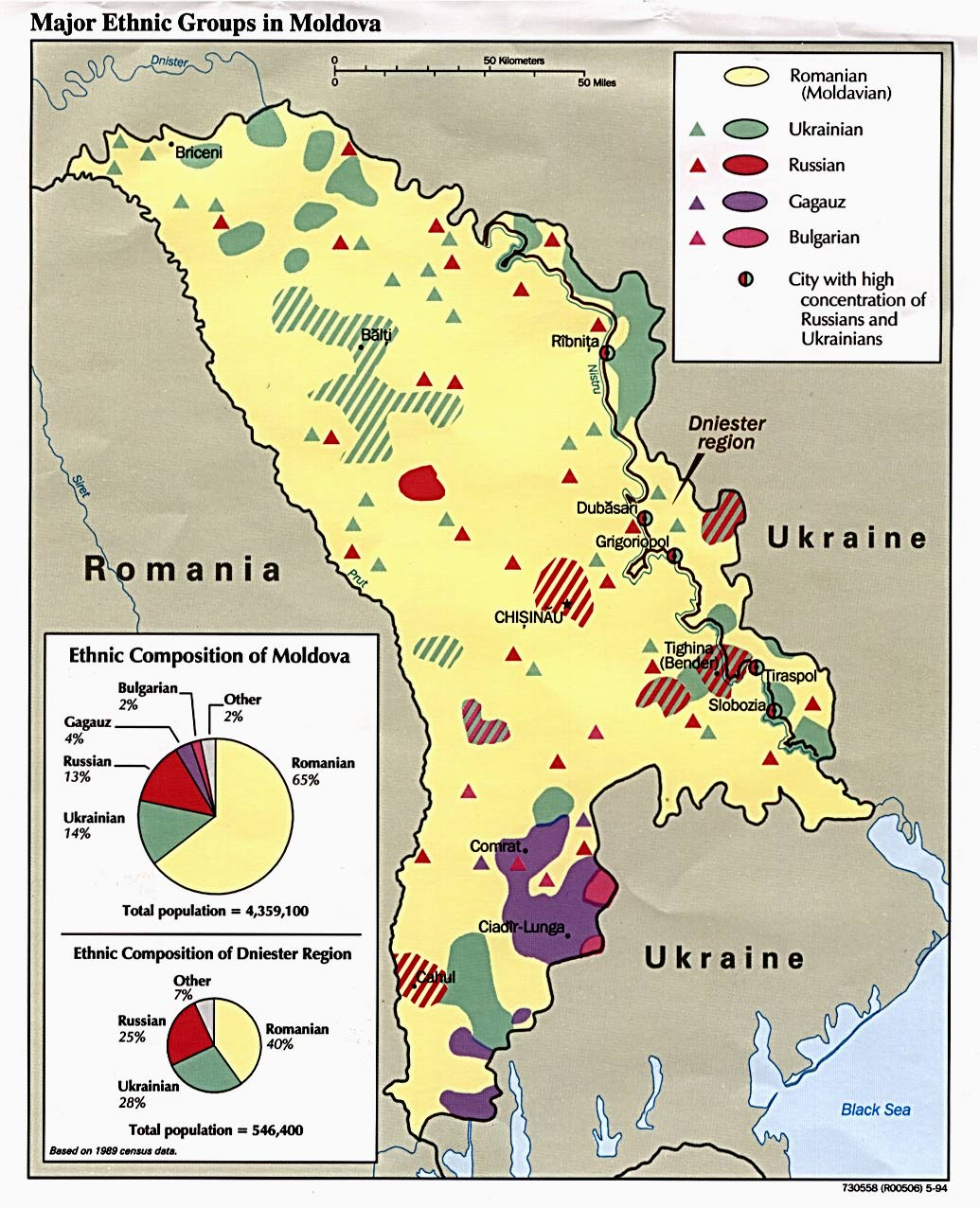
Ethnic groups of the Moldavian SSR (the predecessor of modern Moldova) in 1989, including Transnistria

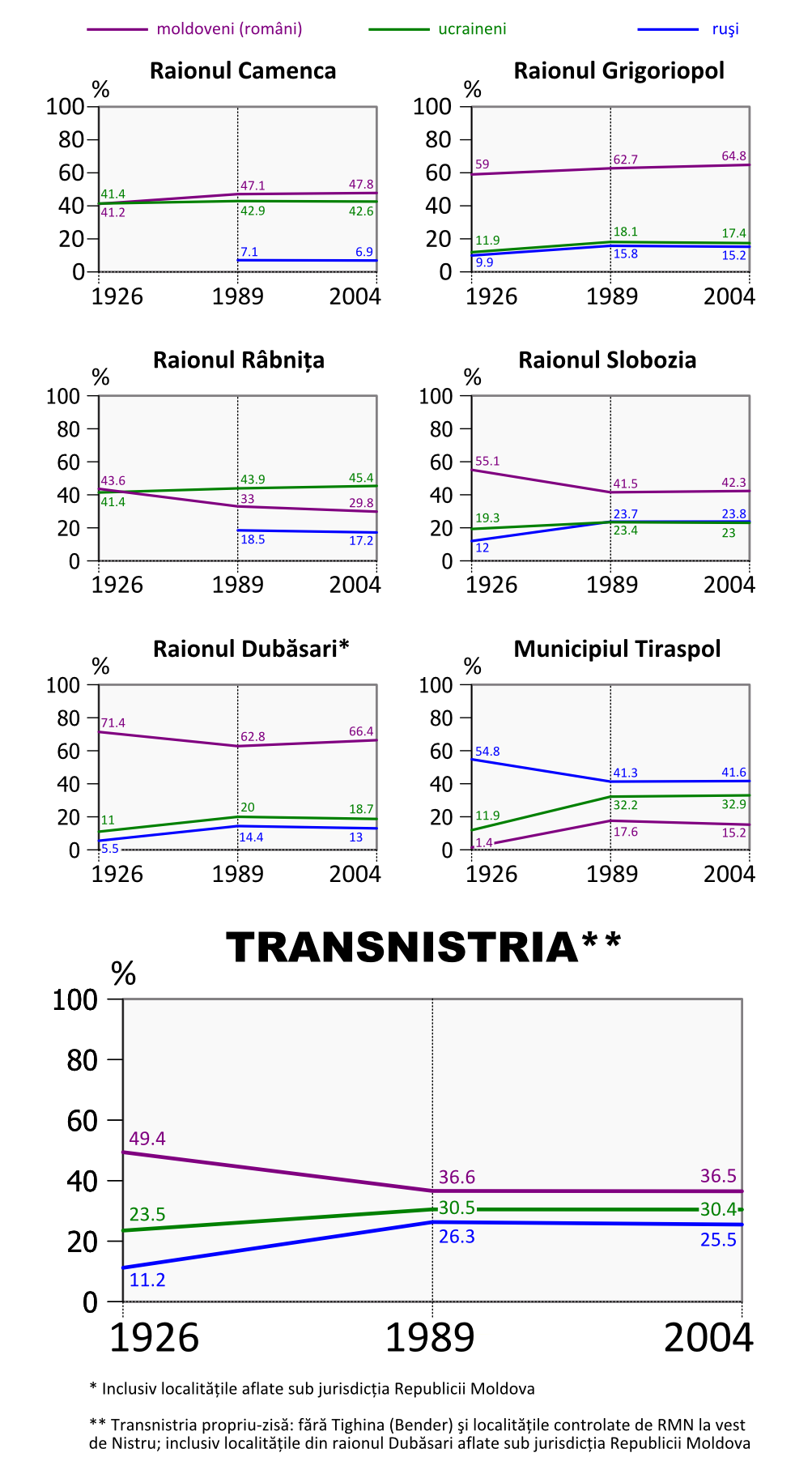
Graphs showing the demographic history of Transnistria

The Romanian-language schools in Transnistria are subject to limitations by the government of Transnistria, an unrecognized breakaway region of Moldova since 1992.

== Background ==
Romanian-language schools that identified their language as Moldovan were first established in Transnistria after the 1924 formation of the Moldavian Autonomous Soviet Socialist Republic (Moldavian ASSR), which was part of the Ukrainian Soviet Socialist Republic (Ukrainian SSR). In 1940, the former Moldavian ASSR was split; 8 districts were included in the Ukrainian SSR and 6 districts were joined with part of Bessarabia in the new Soviet Socialist Republic of Moldavia (Moldavian SSR). In the Ukrainian part of the former Moldavian ASSR, Romanian-language schools were transformed into Russian-language schools, but in the 6 districts that remained part of the Soviet Socialist Republic of Moldova a network of "Moldovan-language schools" was kept.

== History ==
=== 1992–2003 ===
The Moldovan 1989 language law, that introduced the Latin script as the official script of the Republic of Moldova, was boycotted by the Transnistrian authorities, and all Romanian-language schools in Transnistria were ordered to keep the Cyrillic script. After the War of Transnistria ended in mid-1992, the local schools became regulated by the government of Transnistria. The schools that chose to use the Latin script back in 1989 came under pressure of the authorities and most were forced to return to the Cyrillic script. Only six Romanian-language schools identifying as such were allowed to keep the Latin script in Transnistria.

A 2001 article by Tatiana Corai states, "According to a survey conducted within the Civil Society Program, about 60 per cent of Moldovan children are forced, for different reasons, to attend Russian schools. The survey shows that 66 per cent of local children would like to study in Romanian but do not have the possibility."

Attempts to expand the number of schools which use Latin script are met with heavy-handed repression. In 1996, the director of the only Romanian-language school in Slobozia, who supported the wish of the parents to conduct education in Latin alphabet, was fired and forced to leave the region. In 1999, a lecturer of the Romanian language of the Bender Pedagogical College was dismissed for promoting the Latin script in the institution. This dismissal was preceded by threats on the phone and an aggression in the building where she lived. In September 1996, the administration of Grigoriopol used Cossacks and police members to stop the activity of a Romanian-language school. On 2 October 1996 three teachers were arrested and taken to Tiraspol. On 7 October 1996, as a result of a demarche by the President of the Republic of Moldova and the OSCE Mission, the teachers were released.

Another attempt to teach Romanian clandestinely in Grigoriopol, in a "PMR state-funded school", failed in 2002. Teaching staff and parents were blatantly vilified in the local press as "enemies of the State". One by one, they were invited to "reconsider", threatened with loss of employment and the corresponding entitlement to housing. Children and teachers were forced to write explanations as to why did they use the Latin script and local officials routinely visited classes to check whether tuition was being "properly" conducted. The parent-teacher association was abolished and its head, Mihai Speian, was arrested. The Romanian school in Grigoriopol was forced to move to Doroțcaia, a village controlled by Chișinău, and children commute 10–15 km daily to attend the school.

=== 2004 crisis ===
In the summer of 2004, the Transnistrian authorities closed four of the six schools in the region that taught Romanian using the Latin script. Some of the 3,400 enrolled children were affected by this measure and the teachers and parents who opposed the closures were temporarily arrested for up to six hours. During the crisis, the Moldovan government decided to create a blockade that would isolate the disputed region from the rest of the world. The blockade was ineffective because of a lack of cooperation from Ukraine, led at the time by Leonid Kuchma. Transnistria retaliated with a series of actions meant to destabilize the economic situation in Moldova, in particular, by cutting the power supply from the power plants that were built in Transnistria in Soviet times. As a result, this crisis generated power outages in parts of Moldova.

A leading figure in the conflict was Elena Bomeshko, the Minister of Education for Transnistria. According to her and "official Transnistrian policy" as she said it, the language is referred to as "Romanian" when it is taught in Latin script and referred to as "Moldovan" when the Cyrillic script is used. Transnistria rejects accusations of anti-Romanian bias and defends its preference of Cyrillic for Romanian as a way to maintain the original language, pointing to the fact as far back as the Middle Ages, Moldovan Bibles were always written in Cyrillic. While the Romanian language used the Cyrillic alphabet for centuries, it is no longer used in Romania. Cyrillic script is still used in some parts of Moldova, but only one newspaper (state-owned by the Transnistrian authorities) prints a few hundred copies in Cyrillic.

The closed Romanian schools were reopened, after registering as private institutions with the Transnistrian authorities. Pressure from the European Union (a travel ban was introduced to 10 Transnistrian education officials) probably sped up the process, but they still have the status of "private schools" and consequently do not receive funding from the Transnistrian government.

Many teachers and parents of students studying at "Moldovan" schools with Cyrillic script had contacted the Moldovan Helsinki Committee for Human Rights to ask for support to turn education in Romanian (Latin script), as the studies based on the Cyrillic script and Soviet curricula do not have any perspective and the children are unable to pursue higher studies anywhere. The OSCE High Commissioner on National Minorities has condemned the actions of Transnistrian authorities as a "linguistic cleansing".

=== 2005–present ===
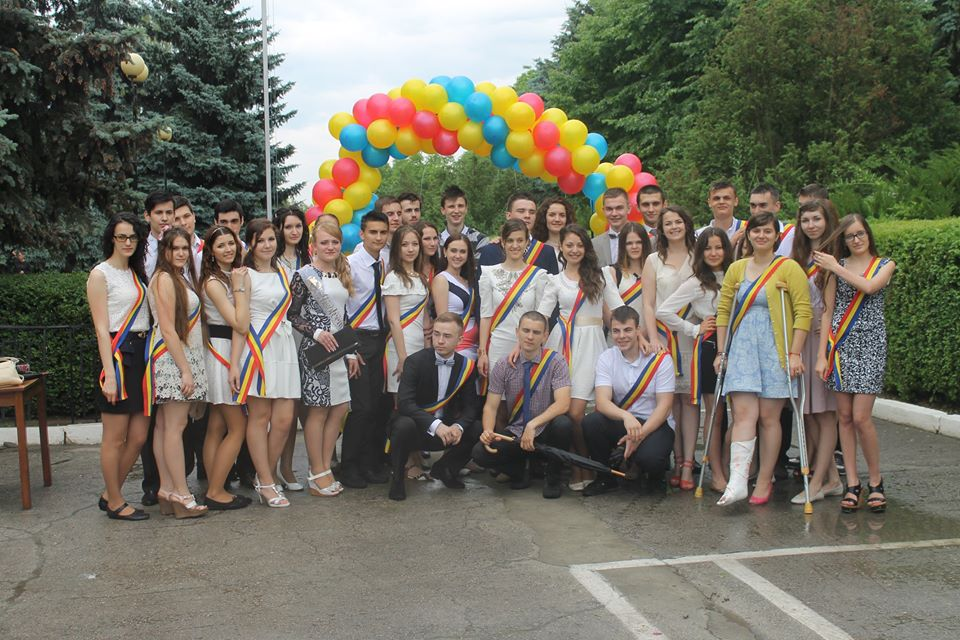
Students at the Alexandru cel Bun High School in Bender celebrating the end of the academic year in May 2013

An OSCE report from June 2005 states: "If they [Moldovan parents in Transnistria] enroll their children in one of these schools that offer a Moldovan curriculum using a Latin script, they risk being threatened by the regional security service, and seeing their jobs put in jeopardy. Sending their children in one of the 33 Transdniestrian schools they teach in their native language in Cyrillic is, however, hardly an appealing alternative, as the schools follow an out-dated curriculum and use textbooks from the Soviet period". This is the reason why many Moldovans from Transnistria send their children to harassment-free Russian language schools. There were over 1,600 students in the Romanian-language schools in Transnistria in 2020-2021. Among the 44,006 students who attended Transnistrian government schools in 2018-2019, 38,240 attended Russian-language ones (86.90%), 2,974 Moldovan-language ones in the Cyrillic alphabet (6.76%), 2,376 mixed Russian and Moldovan ones (5.4%) and Ukrainian ones 416 (0.95%). This would suggest that about 15% of the population of Transnistria was studying in the Romanian language in the Cyrillic or Latin alphabets, including those in the bilingual schools. In 2020, 34.2% of the kindergarten students were ethnic Moldovans, while 28% were ethnic Ukrainians.

The Transnistrian authorities do not recognize the diplomas issued by the Moldovan schools using the Latin script, making it impossible for graduates of those schools to study in Transnistrian higher educational institutions.

In November 2006, the European Court of Human Rights accepted to examine the claims submitted by three Moldovan schools in Transnistria (from Bender, Rîbnița and Grigoriopol) regarding the violation of their right to education and right to work in conditions of non-discrimination. The three schools concerned regard Russia and Moldova as responsible for violation of their rights. In June 2009, the Court conducted hearings on three similar cases: Caldare and 42 Others v. Moldova and Russia (no. 8252/05), Catan and 27 Others v. Moldova and Russia (no. 43370/04), Cervaschi and 98 Others v. Moldova and Russia (no. 18454/06). In 2010, the Court has decided the case to be partly admissible In 2012, the Court decided that the right to education of the applicants was violated by Russia, but not by Moldova.

In November 2006, Louis O'Neill, head of the OSCE mission to Moldova, urged local authorities in the Transnistrian city of Rîbnița to return a confiscated building to the Romanian-language school located in the city. The building was built by the Government of Moldova and was almost finished in 2004, when Transnistrian police took it by force, during the school crisis.

In August 2021, the Transnistrian government refused to register the Lucian Blaga High School at Tiraspol and forced it to cease its activities for 3 months, which will affect the school year of the students of the school and constitutes a violation of several articles of the Convention on the Rights of the Child.

On 16 September 2025, the Bureau for Reintegration of the Republic of Moldova announced that 2,041 students were enrolled in Romanian-language schools in Transnistria in the 2025–2026 academic year, exceeding 2,000 such students for the first time in 15 years.

== List of current Romanian-language schools in Transnistria ==
There are eight schools teaching Romanian in different localities of Transnistria:

- Lucian Blaga High School (Liceul Teoretic Lucian Blaga), Tiraspol
- Alexandru cel Bun High School (Liceul Teoretic Alexandru cel Bun), Bender (Tighina)
- Ștefan cel Mare și Sfânt High School (Liceul Teoretic Ștefan cel Mare și Sfânt), Grigoriopol
- Mihai Eminescu High School (Liceul Teoretic Mihai Eminescu), Dubăsari
- Evrika High School (Liceul Teoretic Evrika), Rîbnița
- Education Institution School of boarding type for orphan children and children left without parental care (Instituția de Învățămînt Școala de tip internat pentru copii orfani și copii rămași fără îngrijirea părinților), Bender (Tighina)
- Roghi Gymnasium (Gimnaziul Roghi), Roghi
- Corjova Gymnasium (Gimnaziul Corjova), Corjova

=== Villages without Romanian-language schools ===
The following villages with ethnic Romanian or Moldovan majorities or important minorities in Transnistria lack a school in their native languages:

- 3 villages with 100% Moldovan population with only Russian-language schools: Cuzmin (Camenca District), Broșteni, Lenino (Rîbnița District).
- 5 villages with Moldovan majority with only Russian-language schools: Vadul Turcului, Sovetskoe, Mocra (Rîbnița District), Comisarovca Nouă (Dubăsari District), Gîrtop (Grigoriopol District).
- 4 villages with around 50% Moldovans with only Russian-language schools: Zozuliani (Rîbnița District), Crasnoie, Glinoia (Slobozia District), Protiagailovca (near Tighina).
- 21 villages with 100% Moldovan population, without any schools: Frunzovca, Podoimița (Camenca District), Vasilievca, Saraței, Vladimirovca, Zaporojeț, Besarabca, Jurca (Rîbnița District), Goianul Nou, Vasilievca, Afanasievca, Alexandrovca Nouă, Bosca (Dubăsari District), Pobeda, Kotovca, Bruslachi, Mocriachi, Marian, Crasnoe, India, Tocmazeia (Grigoriopol District).
- 2 villages with Moldovan majority without any schools: Butuciani (Rîbnița District), Priozornoie (Slobozia District).
- 12 villages with important Moldovan minority and only Russian-language schools: Gidirim, Voroncău, Popenchi (Rîbnița District), Doibani 2, Jerjinscoe (Dubăsari District), Hlinaia, Șipca (Grigoriopol District), Vladimirovca, Frunze, Pervomaisc, Cremenciug, Dnestrovsc (Slobozia District).

== See also ==
- Anti-Romanian sentiment
- Human rights in Transnistria
- Russification
- Rizokarpaso Primary School for Greek Cypriots
