= Pechera, Vinnytsia Oblast =

Village in Tulchyn Raion, Vinnytsia Oblast, Ukraine

Pechara Печера
- Village
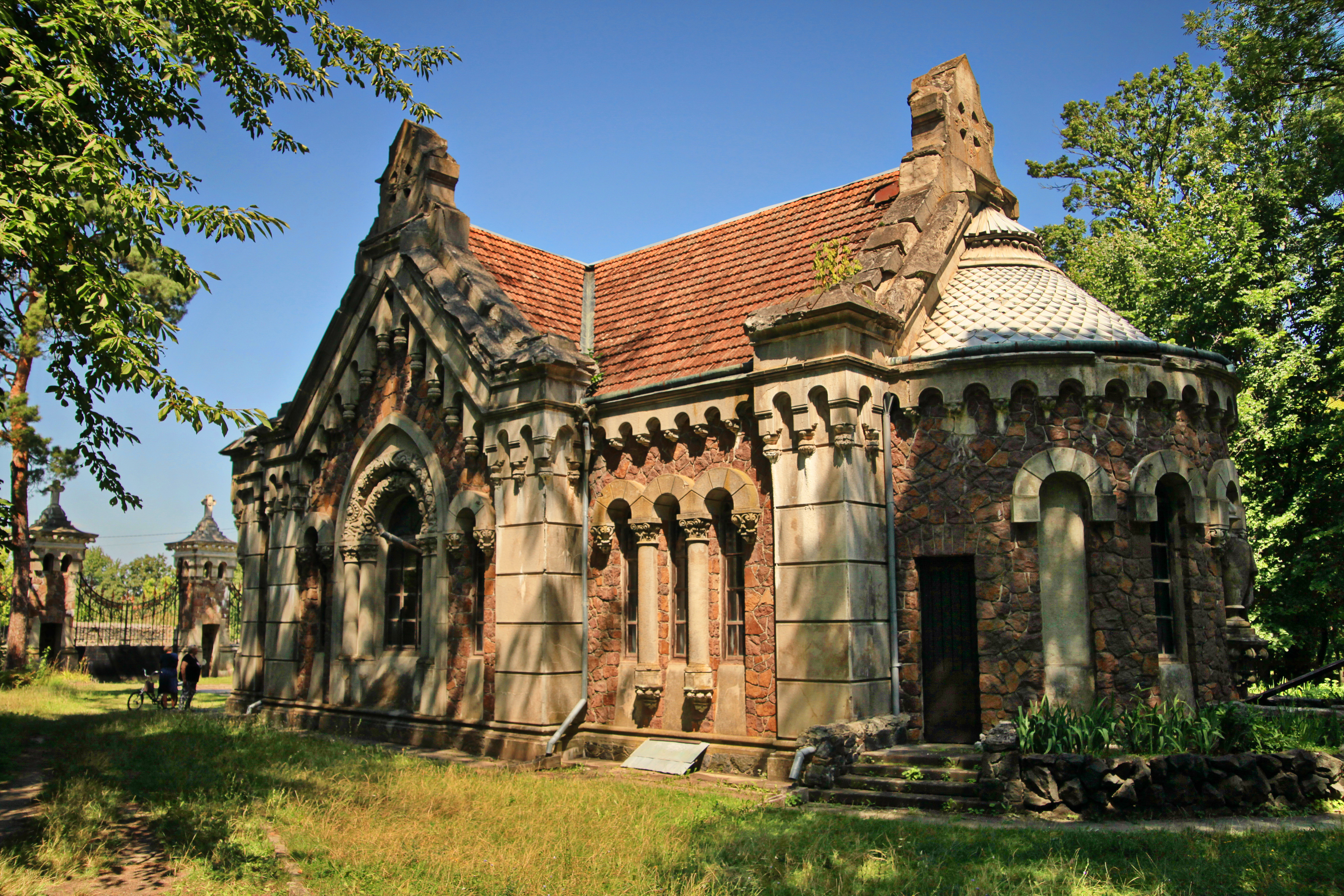
- Potocki Mausoleum Chapel

- Location within Vinnytsia Oblast Location within Ukraine
- Country: Ukraine
- Oblast: Vinnytsia Oblast
- Raion: Tulchyn Raion
- Hromada: Shpykiv rural hromada

Population
  - Total: 1,141
- Time zone: UTC+2 (EET)
  - Summer (DST): UTC+3 (EEST)

Pechera (Ukrainian: Печера, Polish: Peczara, Romanian: Peciora) is a village in Tulchyn Raion of Vinnytsia Oblast of Ukraine. It is located along the Southern Bug river, in the historic region of Podolia. The population is 780 people.

== History ==
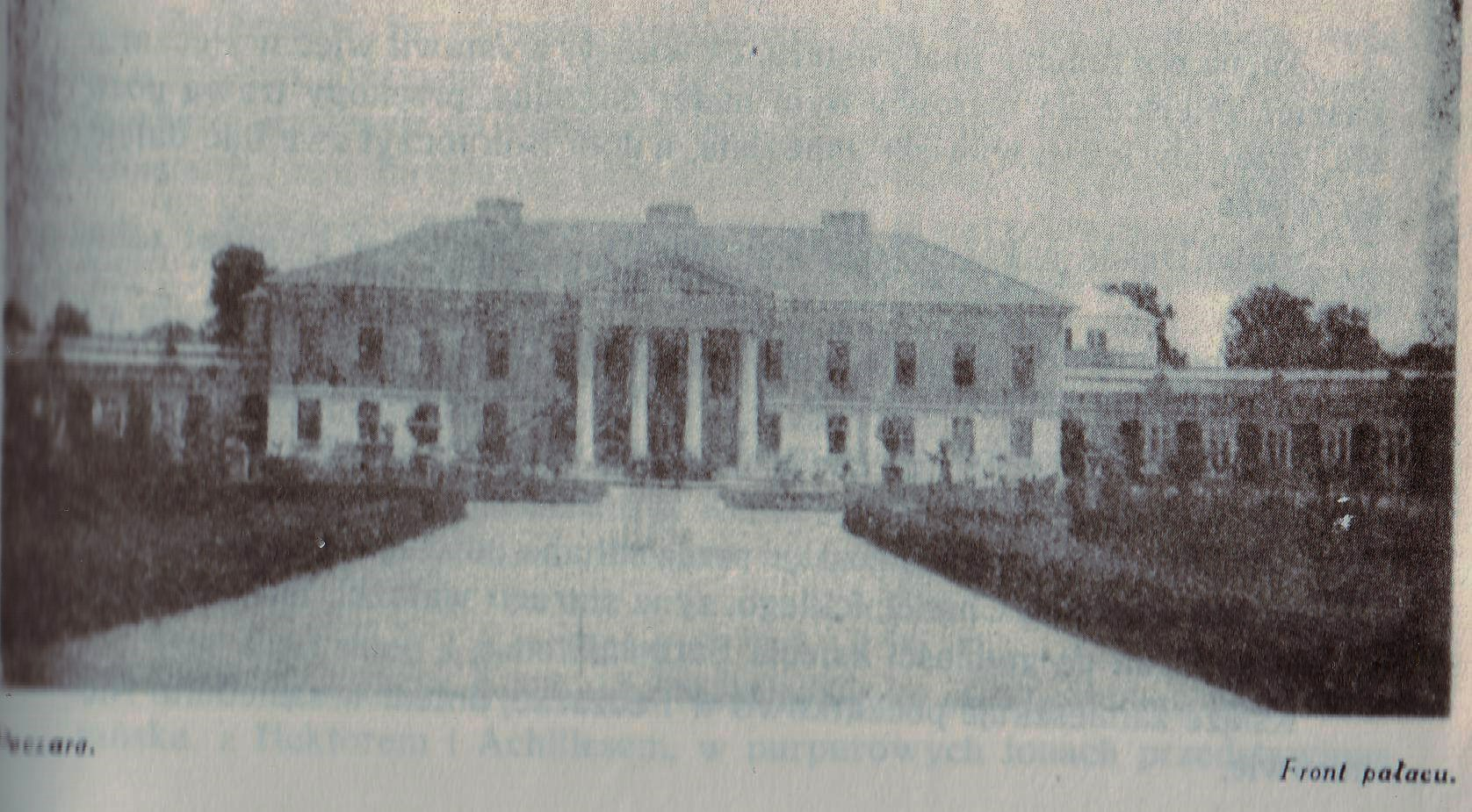
Potocki Palace before 1928

The name of the village comes from the cave passages, which served as shelter for the inhabitants of the settlement from the constant attacks of enemies. Peczara was a possession of the Zasławski, Wiśniowiecki, Potocki and Świejkowski families, administratively located in the Winnica County in the Bracław Voivodeship in the Lesser Poland Province of the Kingdom of Poland. In 1672, the settlement passed to the Ottoman Empire. In 1682, it became a residence of Moldavian Prince George Ducas, although he only stayed there a few times a year. In 1699, it returned to Poland, and then was annexed by Russia in the Second Partition of Poland in 1793. Afterwards, it was located in the Bratslav uezd in the Podolia Governorate. Since 1917 it is part of Ukraine.

During World War II, it was the site of the Pechora concentration camp where thousands of Jews were murdered.

== Sights ==
Local landmarks are the Mausoleum Chapel of the Potocki family, designed by Władysław Horodecki, and the Church of Nativity of the Theotokos. There are also remains of the former palace of the Potocki family, and memorials to local victims of World War II.

== Gallery ==
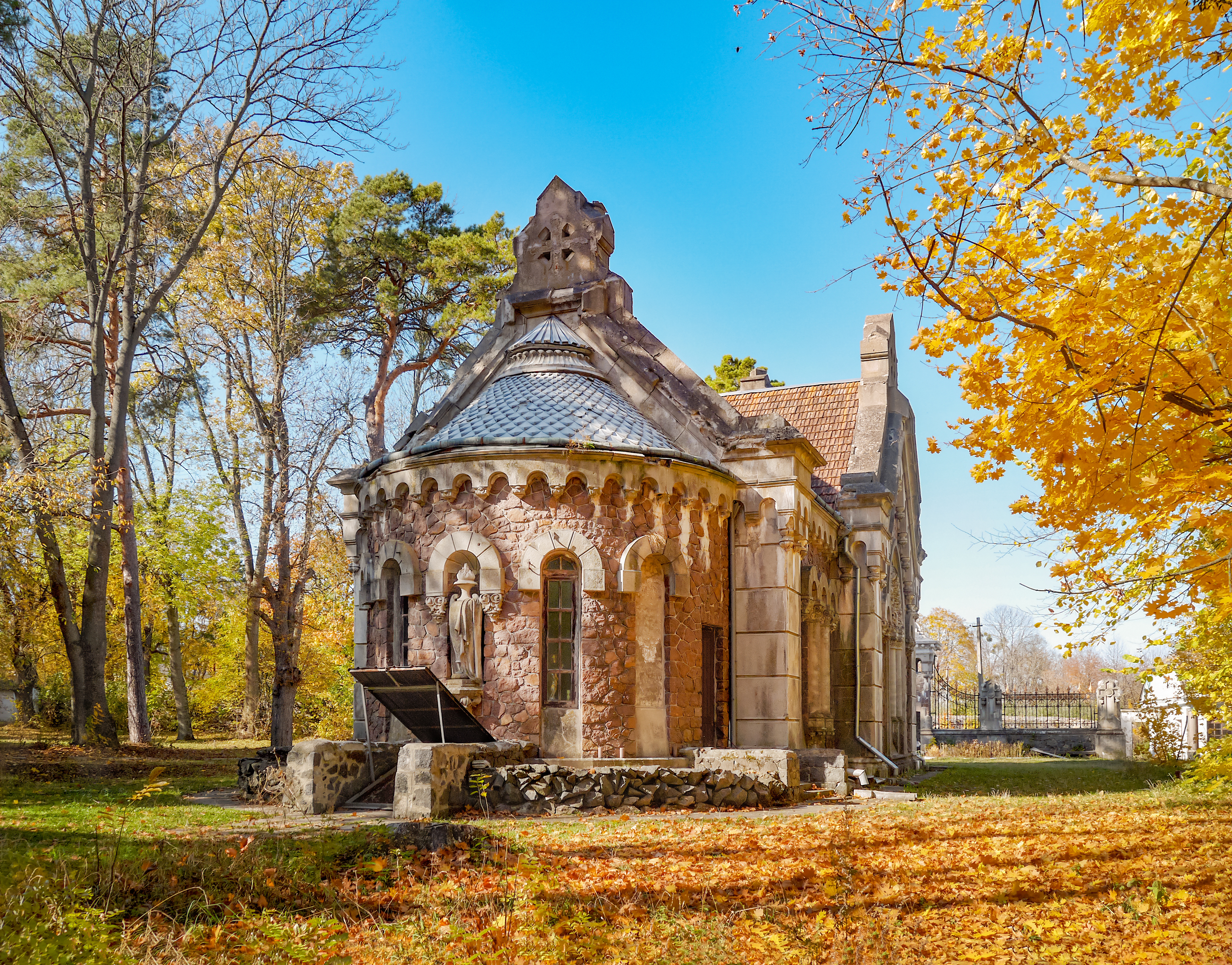
Potocki Mausoleum Chapel

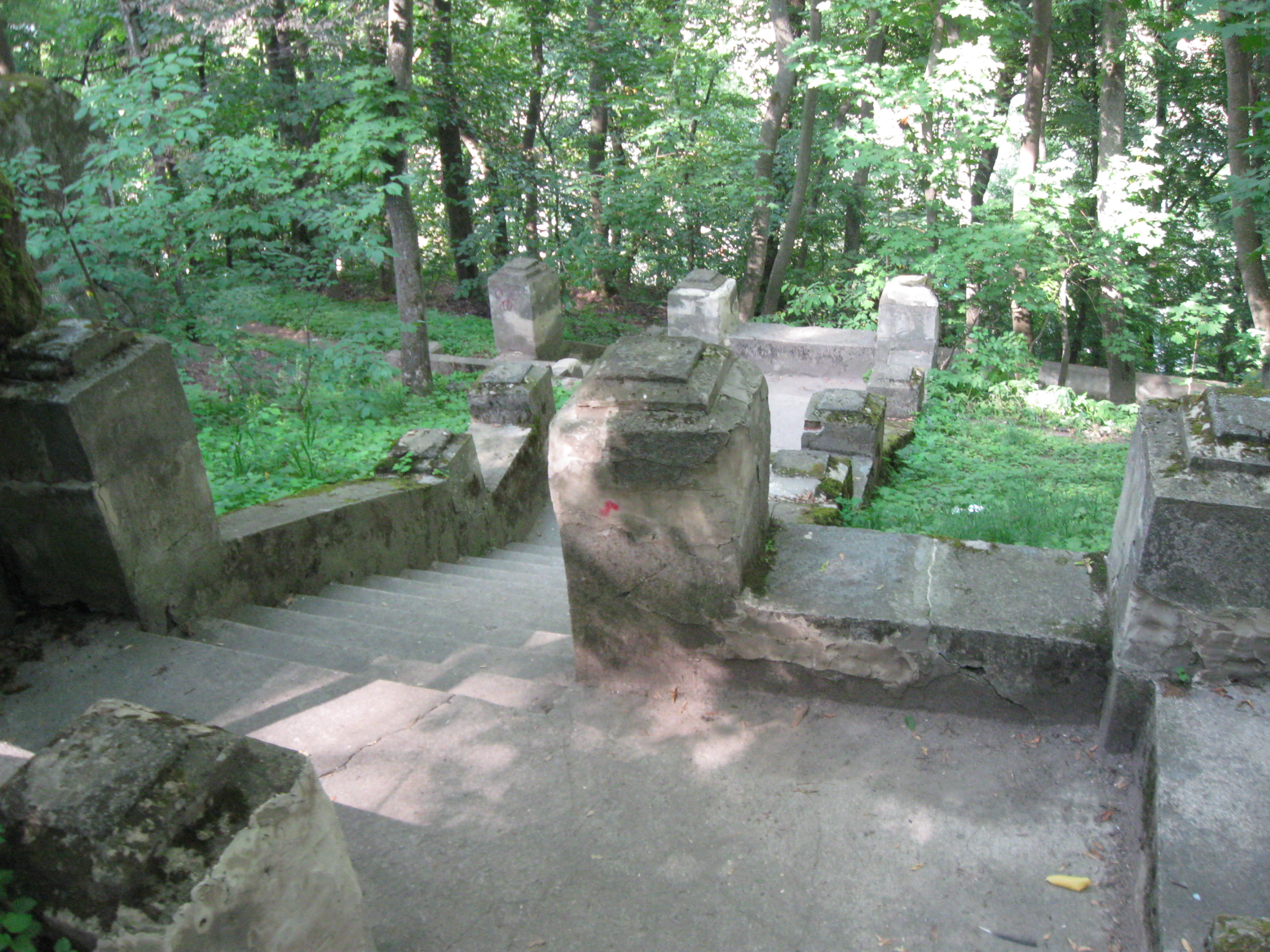
Stairs to the river from the park of the former Potocki Palace.

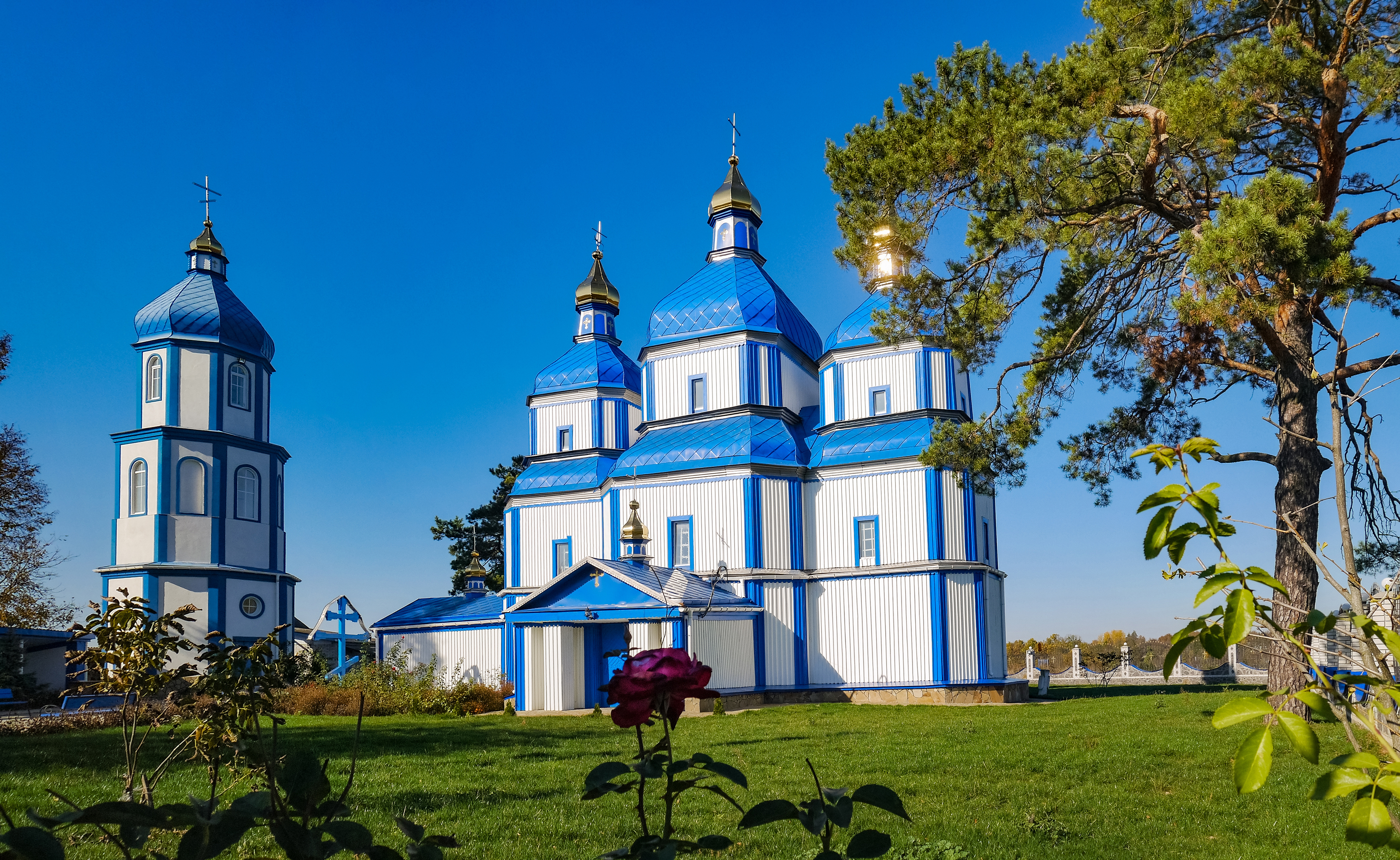
Church of Nativity of the Theotokos.

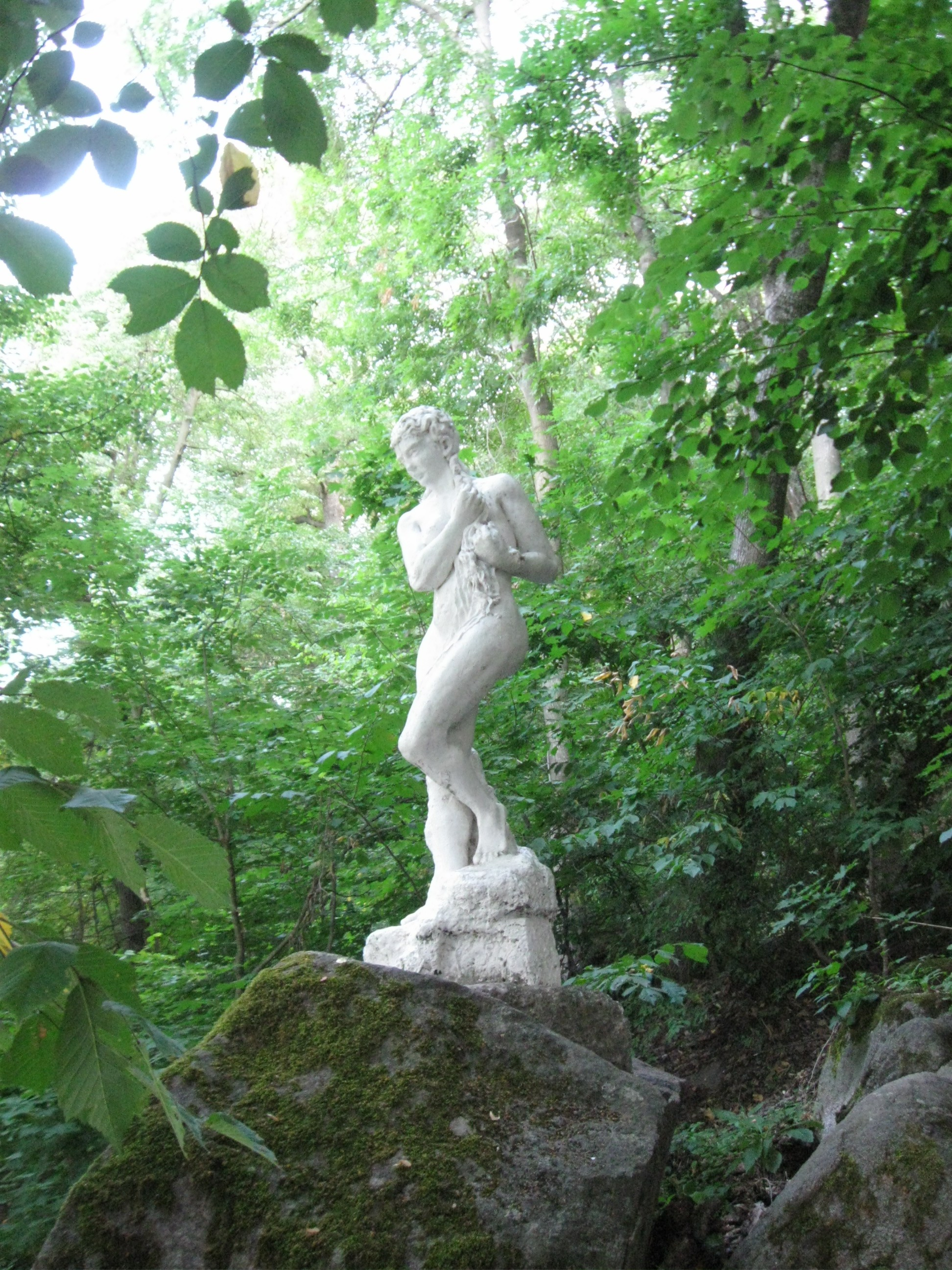
Statue on the bank of the Southern Bug.

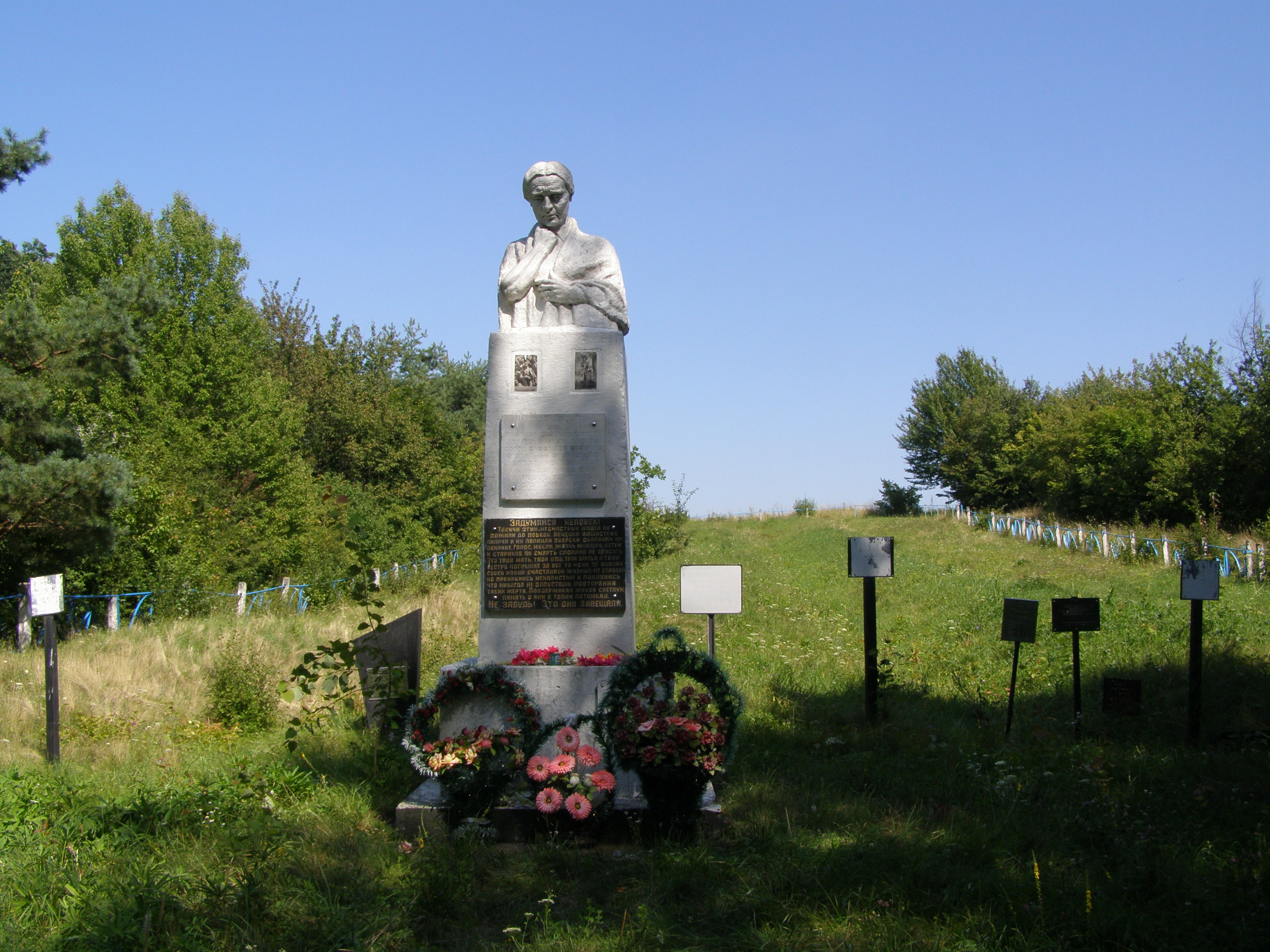
Monument at the mass graves, Jewish cemetery.

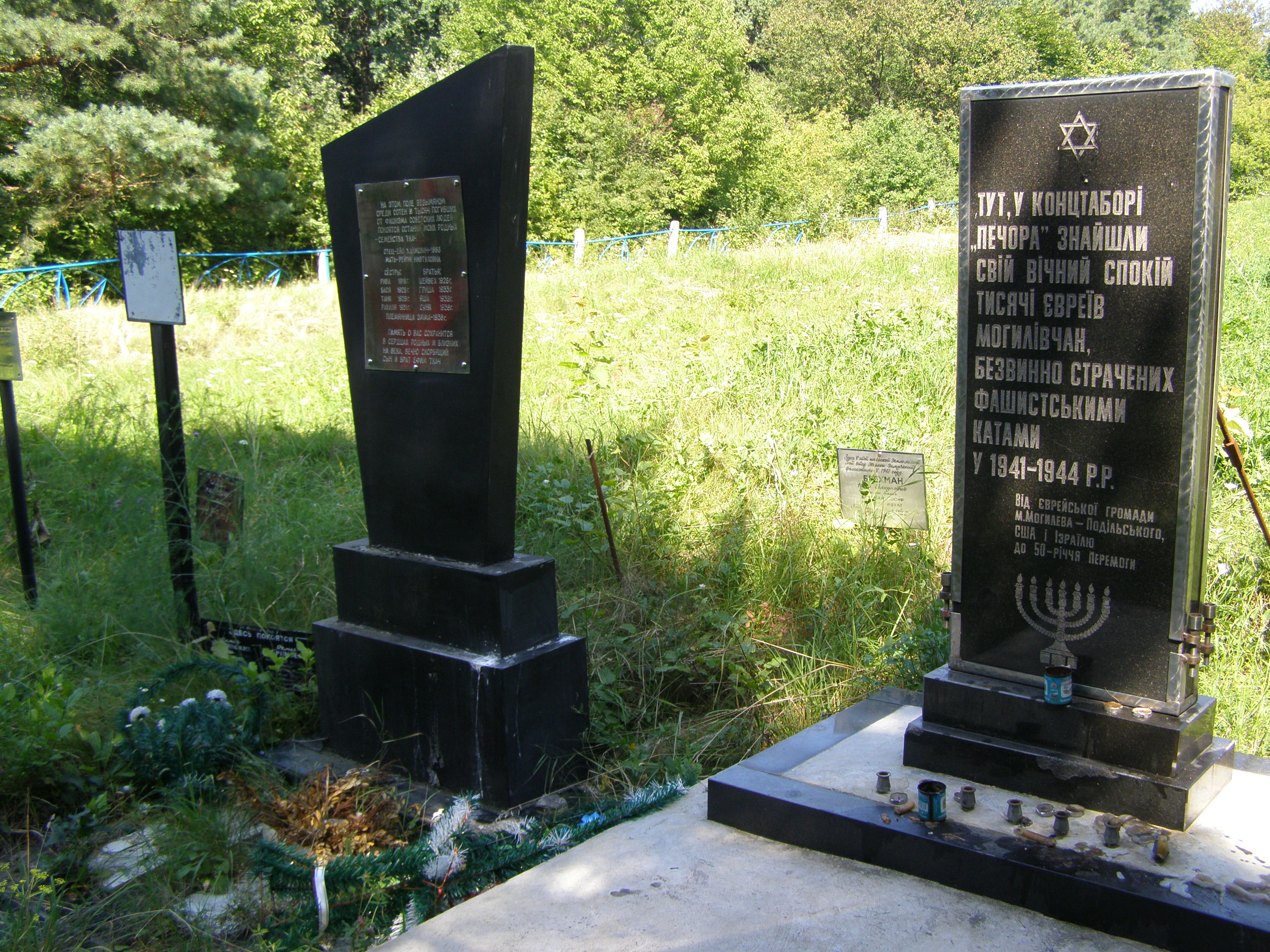
Monument at the mass graves, Jewish cemetery
