= 1997 Moscow memorandum =

The 1997 Moscow memorandum, also known as the Primakov memorandum (after the then-Foreign Minister Yevgeny Primakov of Russia), was an agreement governing relations between Moldova and Transnistria aimed at solving the Transnistria conflict.

Translated from the original Russian text, the full formal title of the document is Memorandum on the principles of normalizations of the relations between the Republic of Moldova and Transnistria.

The memorandum's historical importance followed the need for both Tiraspol and Chişinău to normalize relations in the wake of the 1992 War of Transnistria.

It was signed in Moscow on 8 May 1997, by Moldovan President Petru Lucinschi and Transnistrian President Igor Smirnov, with the mediation of the Russian Federation, Ukraine and Niels Helveg Petersen on behalf of the Organization for Security and Co-operation in Europe Mission in Moldova.

In compliance with the final clause of the memorandum, the relations between the Republic of Moldova and Transnistria shall be developed within the framework of a common state, within the borders of Moldovan SSR. The Russian Federation and Ukraine stated their readiness to become guarantors of the Transnistrian status observance, as well as of the memorandum's provisions. Chişinău and Tiraspol have decided to sustain the establishment of legal and state relations: the mutual decision coordination, inclusively regarding prerogatives delimitation and delegation, the safeguard of mutual security, the Transnistrian participation in the process of accomplishment of the foreign policy of the Republic of Moldova. The memorandum also gave Transnistria the right to independently conduct foreign economic activity, although later the memorandum provisions had widely diverging legal and political interpretations in Chişinău and Tiraspol.

The parties reaffirmed the 1992 ceasefire and requested that Russia, Ukraine and OSCE continue their mediation efforts. Both parties agreed that the Dniestr Region would have the right to unilaterally establish and maintain international contacts in the economic, scientific-technical and cultural spheres.

== See also ==
- Political status of Transnistria
- History of Transnistria
