= 2006 Transnistrian customs crisis =

International trade issue

The 2006 Transnistrian customs crisis started on March 3, 2006, when Ukraine imposed new customs regulations on its border with Moldova on the Transnistrian region by declaring that it will only import goods from Transnistria with documents processed by Moldovan customs offices, as part of the implementation of a joint customs protocol between Ukraine and Moldova on December 30, 2005.

== Background ==
From February 1996 to 2001, there was an agreement between Moldovan and Transnistrian authorities, according to which Pridnestrovian Moldavian Republic (PMR) export and import goods were not subject to Moldovan taxes, PMR was granted the right to use the customs seal of the Republic of Moldova on its goods, and PMR agreed to establish joint customs centers with Moldova on the border with Ukraine. PMR did not honor the agreement and Moldovan officials are still not allowed to enter PMR territory.

== The conflict ==
On March 3, 2006, Ukraine implemented the decision to allow exports originating in Transnistria (to Ukraine or via Ukraine) enter Ukrainian territory only if they carry Moldovan customs stamps, and that imports bound for Transnistria (from or via Ukraine) can enter Transnistria only through Moldovan customs checkpoints, which are situated on Moldovan-controlled territory.

Moldova announced it had created favorable conditions for the registration of Transnistria-based businesses:half-hour long procedure to obtain a six-month export license; granted tax breaks and duty exemptions to Transnistria-based companies that register as Moldovan. (such companies are then entitled to all trading privileges that Moldovan companies enjoy, Moldova being a member of the World Trade Organization). Moldovan authorities had held a series of joint conferences with Transnistria companies, Ukrainian authorities, and EU representatives from December through February, informing Transnistria business in detail about Moldovan registration procedures and the introduction of Moldovan customs documents on that border sector.

Transnistria's Minister of Economy, Elena Chernenko, says that Transnistria loses $2–2.5 million daily from the Ukrainian regulations. (Transnistrian GDP is about $420 million) Transnistrian and some Russian authorities have termed the act an "economic blockade," a violation of the 1997 Moscow memorandum in the part about the right of Transnistria to maintain international relations.

According to the data of the Moldovan Ministry of Reintegration, during the two days of the partial border de-blocking by Tiraspol, various companies had managed to import nearly 1,400 tons of chicken meat into the Transnistrian region. And since the beginning of the year, Transnistria has already imported 12,600 tons of foodstuffs, including 9,700 tons of meat, 890 tons of fish, over a thousand tons of sugar, 18 tons of medicines.

Out of the major mediators of the regional conflict, the United States, the European Union and the OSCE approved of the Ukrainian move, while Russia sees it as a form of political pressure, and its Ministry of Internal Affairs issued a statement that said in part: "The Russian Federation as the guarantor country of settlement whose interests are directly affected calls for reviewing the customs regime imposed for Transnistria and for starting immediate consultations among all the parties concerned in order to work out mutually acceptable ways to solve problems."

For all of 2006, Transnistria's president Igor Smirnov estimated the losses to Transnistria at $420 million.

== Timeline ==
On March 3, 2006, Ukraine started implementing the Ukraine-Moldova agreement on introducing a legal trade regime on that border, citing EU requirements to Ukraine as well as the 2005 Ukraine-Moldova-EU Commission Memorandum on measures against illicit activities on that border. Ukraine's Customs Service Chairman issued the relevant orders that same day.

On March 4, Tiraspol retaliated by blocking Moldovan and Ukrainian transport at the borders of Transnistria.

On March 10, Russian State Duma reaffirmed Russia's earlier definition of the event as a "blockade," called for return to pre-March 3 status and warned that the event may lead to a "humanitarian disaster." Earlier, Russia promised humanitarian assistance to Transnistria in response to this event. The Republic of Artsakh, another unrecognized state, similarly blocked by Azerbaijan, also warned of a humanitarian catastrophe in the area.

On March 16, Valery Litskay, Transnistria's Foreign Affairs Minister, refused to participate in conflict negotiations in Odesa declaring he would only attend together with the Russian side.

On March 17, the President of Ukraine, Viktor Yushchenko, personally invited Transnistria's leader Igor Smirnov for a meeting in Kyiv. Smirnov accepted in principle, but only if Kyiv agrees to suspend the border and customs regime that were introduced on March 3. The same day, Tiraspol warned about a possible suspension of electricity supply to the bordering Odesa Oblast of Ukraine.

On March 18, Transnistria's block on Ukrainian transports was lifted, as a sign of good faith.

On March 22, Moldova recalled its Ambassador from Russia. It was done in response to Russian Ambassador Nikolay Ryabov's remarks placing "primary responsibility" on Moldova for the conflict.

Ukrainian authorities have been accused in the Eurasia Daily Monitor of colluding in bypassing Moldovan customs by allowing road transport to enter Transnistria directly from Ukrainian territory. Official statements from Kyiv portray the passage of such transport as a welcome sign that Transnistria's authorities are lifting the blockade they had installed after March 3 on the border with Ukraine.
