= Nätterqvist =

Nätterqvist is a Swedish surname. Notable people with the surname include:

- Dag Nätterqvist (1922–2009), Swedish Olympic equestrian
- Joakim Nätterqvist (born 1974), Swedish actor, theatre director, musical artist, singer, and songwriter, grandson of Dag
