= Viking (2016 film) =

Russian historical film

- Viking official Russian poster; Danila Kozlovsky as Vladimir I
- Directed by: Andrei Kravchuk
- Screenplay by: Andrey Rubanov; Viktor Smirnov; Andrei Kravchuk
- Based on: 'Primary Chronicle; Kings' sagas
- Produced by: Konstantin Ernst; Anatoliy Maksimov; Aleksandr Utkin; Leonid Vereshchagin
- Starring: Danila Kozlovsky; Svetlana Khodchenkova; Maksim Sukhanov; Aleksandra Bortich; Igor Petrenko; Andrey Smolyakov; Kirill Pletnyov; Aleksandr Ustyugov; Joakim Nätterqvist
- Cinematography: Igor Grinyakin (ru)
- Edited by: Ilya Lebedev; Aleksey Kumakshin; Anna Krutiy
- Music by: Igor Matvienko; Dean Valentine
- Production companies: Dago Productions; Cinema Directorate Studio (Direktsiya kino); Studio Trite; Channel One
- Distributed by: Central Partnership
- Release dates: 29 December 2016 (Russia); 6 January 2017 (Other countries)
- Running time: 128 min (12+); 133 min (18+); 142 min (Blu-ray)
- Country: Russia
- Languages: Russian, Swedish/Norwegian
- Budget: $20.8 million (₽1.25 billion)
- Box office: $27 million [Russia] (₽1.5 billion); $6.7 million (worldwide); $33.7 million (Net Gross)

Viking (Russian: Викинг) is a 2016 Russian historical film about medieval prince Vladimir the Great, Prince of Novgorod directed by Andrei Kravchuk and co-produced by Konstantin Ernst and Anatoliy Maksimov. The film stars Danila Kozlovsky, Svetlana Khodchenkova, Maksim Sukhanov, Aleksandra Bortich, Igor Petrenko, Andrey Smolyakov, Kirill Pletnyov, Aleksandr Ustyugov and Joakim Nätterqvist. The movie is inspired by historical accounts such as Primary Chronicle and Icelandic Kings' sagas.

Viking was released in Russia by Central Partnership on 29 December 2016, and the world premiere took place on 6 January 2017. Two versions were released: a 12+ (128 minutes) and an 18+ (133 minutes). With a budget of $20.8 million, Viking was the third most expensive Russian film (after two parts of Burnt by the Sun 2) by the time of its release. The movie was met with mixed reviews by Russian film critics. It grossed $32.3 million at the box office. It grossed $25 million at the box office in Russia and the Commonwealth of Independent States, becoming the top-grossing Russian film to be released in 2016.

== Plot ==
After the death of Grand Prince Sviatoslav I, Kievan Rus' is now ruled by his sons Yaropolk, Oleg and Vladimir. While en route to Polotsk, part of Yaropolk's retinue led by Lyut go hunting for an aurochs and inadvertently run into a rival party led by Oleg. Oleg is given the opportunity to kill the aurochs first but when he fails Lyut kills the animal instead. In rage Oleg murders Lyut and gives chase to his men, running into Yaropolk's main host instead. When Sveneld (one of Svyatoslav's old warriors) tries to defuse the situation, Yaropolk and his men start chasing Oleg. When seeing the chase, Polotsk's lord Rogvolod closes the gates before Oleg can enter. Oleg tries to whip his way through a crowd to reach the gates but falls off the causeway and is killed. Yaropolk decides to have Sveneld answer to pay for Lyut's death but Sveneld thwarts his execution and flees.

In the summer, Sveneld returns to Polotsk with Vladimir and his retinue of Viking mercenaries. Vladimir intends to marry Rogvolod's daughter Rogneda, but is rejected because she believes he only wants to marry her to access her father's soldiers and insults Vladimir by calling him the son of a slave - referring to his mother. Furious over the insult to him and his mother Vladimir lays siege to Polotsk. When ordering the Vikings to do a "berserker attack", the Vikings coax Vladimir into drinking their "berserker potion" to prove himself. Under its influence Vladimir takes part of the charge and rapes Rogneda at the Vikings' encouragement. After passing out Vladimir discovers his men have murdered Rogvolod and his wife, but manages to prevent them from killing Rogneda, seemingly regretting his actions.

The war party goes to Kiev to have Yaropolk answer for Oleg's death. They find Kiev empty, Yaropolk having fled with the treasury. Yaropolk's Christian wife Irina facilitates a negotiation between the brothers, with Vladimir insisting he wants to solve the matter peacefully. Yaropolk arrives in good faith, but is assassinated by two Vikings. Vladimir is distraught, but his involvement is unclear. As Sveneld proclaims Vladimir the new grand prince, Yaropolk's most loyal follower Varyazhko swears revenge for the murder. Using the treasury Varyazhko is able to recruit a host of Pechenegs. Meanwhile, Vladimir is unable to pay his own mercenaries who refuse to fight. Though able to hold against several direct assaults, Vladimir is unable to drive away Varyazhko. Desperate, the inhabitants of Kiev, including Rogneda, attempt to sacrifice the son of Vladimir's warrior Fyodor to the gods, resulting in the deaths of both Fyodor and his son when Vladimir does not act. Vladimir eventually agrees to a parley with Varyazhko but is betrayed when the Pechenegs attack. Most of Vladimir's closest followers are killed, but Vladimir and Sveneld are saved when emissaries from the Byzantine Empire arrive. Varyazhko and the Pechenegs have allied with Byzantine rebels, using a Roman city as a base. Having a common enemy they offer to fund Vladimir.

Realizing the city is impregnable, Vladimir decides to destroy the Roman aqueduct. While searching for the pipe, Varyazhko and his Pechenegs attack. However, they walk into a trap set by Vladimir: when fighting his regular forces the Vikings hurl their longships down the hill causing them to ram into the Pechenegs. Using the destruction and confusion the Vikings are victorious. Vladimir faces off his Varyazhko and defeats him. Insisting his innocence in Yaropolk's death, Vladimir spares Varyazhko. The Vikings are able to locate the pipe and with the water supply cut, the rebels surrender. Vladimir encounters the bishop Anastas who is able to get Vladimir to open up about his guilt. Vladimir admits to being responsible for Yaropolk's death as well as his shame over the death of Rogvolod and Fyodor and the rape of Rogneda. Anastas absolves Vladimir of his sins and moved by the Christian god's ability to forgive Vladimir resolves to stop killing and profess Christianity to the Rus'. The film ends with a scene of mass baptism in the Dnieper.

== Cast ==
- Danila Kozlovsky as Vladimir the Great
- Svetlana Khodchenkova as Irina, the Byzantine Greek wife of Yaropolk I of Kiev
- Maksim Sukhanov as Sveneld, voivode of the Grand Duke Sviatoslav Igorevich
- Igor Petrenko as Varyazhko, the prince of Yaropolk's retinue
- Aleksandra Bortich as Rogneda, princess of Polotsk, wife of Vladimir the Great
- Aleksandr Ustyugov as Yaropolk I of Kiev
- Kirill Pletnyov as Oleg of Drelinia
- Vladimir Epifantsev as Fyodor, the prince of Yaropolk's retinue
- Pawel Delag as Anastas
- Andrey Smolyakov as Rogvolod
- Joakim Nätterqvist as Khevding, the leader of the Vikings
- Harald Rosenstrøm as Einar, Khevding's sidekick
- Rostislav Bershauer as Blud, voivode and boyar of Kiev
- Nikolay Kozak as Lyut, the prince of Yaropolk's retinue
- Ivan Shmakov as John, Fyodor's son (boy in Kiev)
- Aleksey Demidov as Samocha
- Aleksandr Lobanov as Putyata
- John DeSantis as Berserk
- Aleksandr Armer as Ulvar
- Oleg Dobrovan as Valgard
- Ziedonis Lochmelis as Torvald
- Daniil Soldatov, Vilen Babichev and Oleg Sizov as Viking chieftains

== Production ==
=== Development ===
Vladimir Putin meets the cast and crew. On the left, actor Danila Kozlovsky who later regretted participating in the film

The film was produced by Konstantin Ernst and Anatoly Maksimov, best known for the Russian urban fantasy/supernatural thrillers Night Watch and Day Watch.

A few scenes were filmed in 2013 to secure funding, a common way to secure finances for large movie productions in Russia. Most of the production was done in March–July 2015. The budget was on par with the Russian WWII epic Stalingrad, 1,250 million rubles (approximately US$20 million).

The main historical consultants for the film were the historian and archaeologist Vladimir Petrukhin and the linguist Fyodor Uspenskiy.

The costume designer traveled to several cities and countries, buying fabric and studying frescoes and museum in China, India, Helsinki, Riga, Novgorod, Stockholm, and Minsk.

The Pecheneg language, an extinct Turkic language once spoken in Eastern Europe (in what today is most of Ukraine, parts of southern Russia, Moldova, and Hungary) in the 7th–12th centuries, was "re-invented" for the movie.

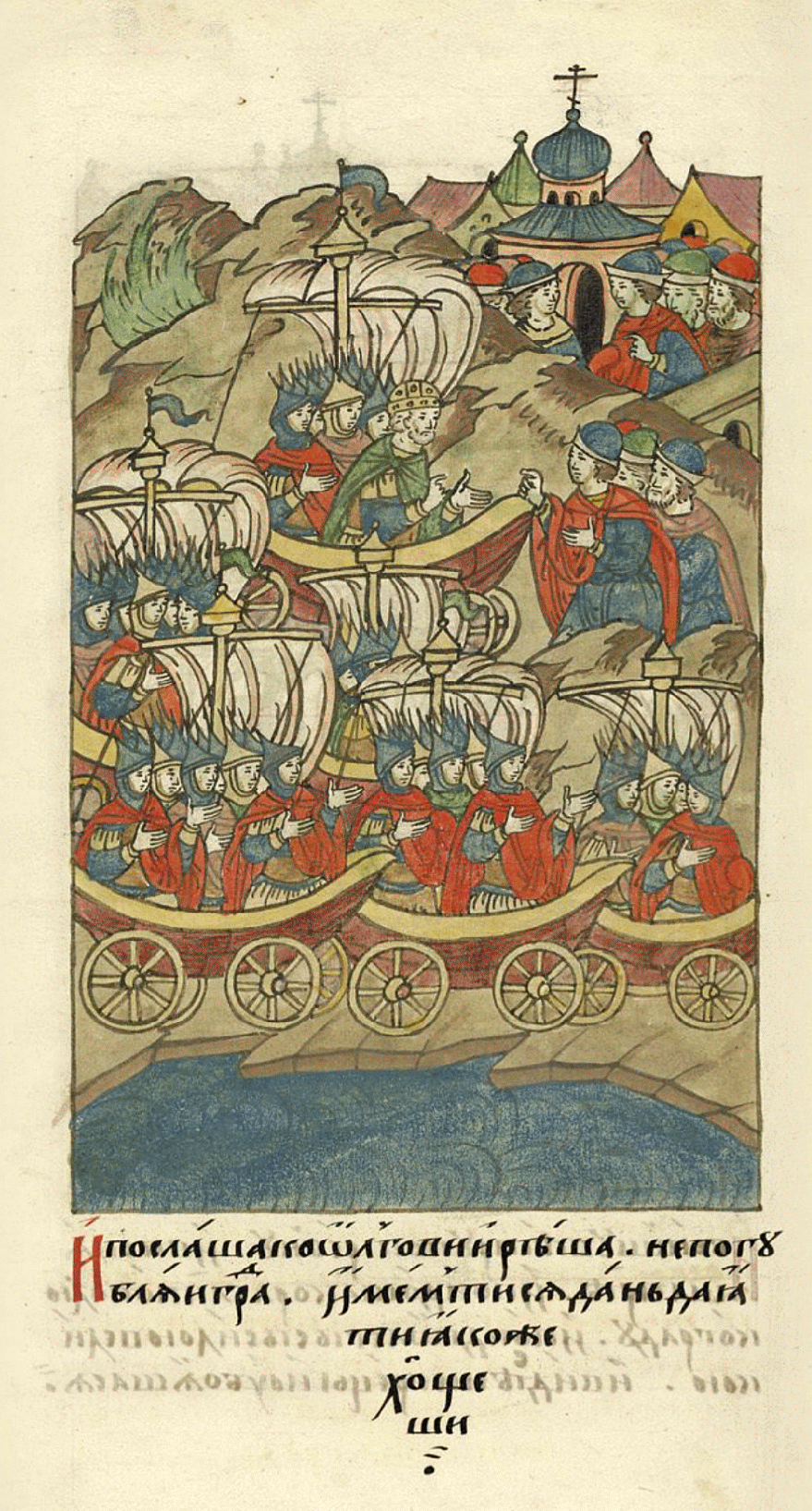
The legend of Oleg the Prophet's assault using ships on land inspired the climax of the movie

=== Casting ===
The cast is mostly Russian; however the film does features Swedish actor Joakim Nätterqvist, Canada's John DeSantis and Belarusian actress Aleksandra Bortich.

Nätterqvist told Sweden's TV4 that on set he worked with a translator, a Norwegian actor who has lived (and educated) in Russia. Most of his dialog is in a very stripped-down amalgam of Swedish and Norwegian, to simulate old Norse.

Members of Kazakhstan's famous Nomad Stunts were responsible for the battle scenes, including the pyrotechnics, explosions and rigging.

=== Filming locations ===
Principal photography began in March 2015. The film was shot on several locations in the Russia-annexed territory of Crimea, including the city of Bakhchysarai, Bakhchysarai Raion, Crimea. In the Taigan Water Reservoir, the town of Bilohirsk, Bilohirsk Raion, Crimea. In the medieval Genoese fortress, the town of Sudak, Crimea. In the village of Shkolnoe, Simferopol Raion, Crimea. In the zakaznik of Cape Fiolent near Sevastopol. Also, the shooting took place at the Glavkino studio.

Later, the scenery of the film was used in the construction of the Viking Cinema Park in the village of Perevalne, Simferopol Raion, Crimea. The construction of the facility began in October 2015 on the left bank of the Kizilkobinka mountain river at the beginning of the ascent to the Red Caves. Cinema Park opened in May 2016

Some scenes were filmed in Ravenna, Italy in mid-August 2015. The shooting took place in Basilica of San Vitale and the Mausoleum of Galla Placidia. This Basilica an important example of early Byzantine architecture in Europe and was used for scenes set in Chersonesus.

== Versions ==
The film was released in two versions, one family friendly version with an age restriction of 12+, and a complete version, with a rating of 18+. According to Radio P4 Stockholm, the movie was also planned eventually to be released as a TV-series, featuring hours of footage that did not make it into the cinematic release.

== Music ==
The author of the music for the film is the Russian composer and producer Igor Matvienko. The soundtrack was created for two years. Previously, the composer studied music of 9-10 centuries, got acquainted with the era of Prince Vladimir. The Specialists from the Gnessin State Musical College were involved in the recording, copies of ancient instruments of that time (hurdy-gurdy, gudok, tambourines, gusli) were ordered. Tracks were recorded on these instruments, then the phonograms were mixed with a synthesizer. A special studio was equipped to record music. The producer Igor Polonsky, arrangers Artyom Vasiliev, Alexander Kamensky, Rafael Safin, the soloist of the Gorod 312 group Aya and many others took part in the work.

The film's trailers (and part of the movie) was scored by Irish composer Dean Valentine. Valentine's music was recorded with the Orchestra Of Ireland. Valentine is best known for his original music for trailers including Captain America: Civil War, Interstellar and American Sniper, but he has also scored Irish documentaries and motion pictures such as Tiger Raid, and Close to Evil.

== Release ==
UK based Red Arrow International will sell the movie internationally. A screening for potential buyers was arranged at the 2016 American Film Market. They received 200 inquiries from 45 territories to buy the movie. The Russian News Agency reported on 19 January 2017, that ‘Viking’ had been sold to more than 60 countries, including Germany, Spain, Belgium, Switzerland, China, South Korea, United Kingdom, Italy, and most of Latin America, even though it was partially filmed in a Russian-annexed territory of Crimea (mostly recognized as a part of Ukraine).

Viking was released in China on 10,000 screens under a deal closed between Central Partnership and Chinese distributors Flame Node Entertainment and Beijing United Film Artists Co.

The film was released in Germany on DVD and Amazon Prime Video (SVOD service) on 29 April. It will have its Swiss premier at the Neuchatel International Fantastic Film Festival on 4 July.

Viking was released in the United Kingdom on 18 September 2017, and in France on 10 October 2017, at the Absurde Seance festival.

In total, this film has been sold to over 80 territories, becoming one of Russia's biggest international sellers in 2017.

The movie was released in the US via Amazon Prime Video in October 2018.

=== Marketing ===
The first official teaser trailer was shown during a closed pitch event with the management of the Russian Ministry of Culture and chairmen of Cinema Foundation of Russia.

In September 2015, Central Partnership distribution studios announced the release date for the film as 22 December 2016. On 19 November 2015, Film Direction and Channel One Russia released the official trailer to the public.

The film was presented on 1 October 2016, as part of Comic-Con Russia 2016, and a large sword fight was performed by the film's stuntmen, replicating a fight scene from the movie. Exclusive materials specially prepared for the convention were shown, including a "live" trailer - stunt show at the stand, which was built in the form of an old Russian outpost. Visitors to the event could participate in competitions on knowledge of Russian history, try on costumes of the characters of the film and take pictures with props.

The set and the scenery used in the production were used to create Russia's first movie-based theme park, which opened in May 2016 near the village of Perevalnoye, Crimea.

== Reception ==
Despite the overwhelming marketing and advertising campaign, the film received low reviews in the Russian press. The film was praised for its visuals, but the story and portrayal of medieval Russians were criticized by critics from Afisha, Time Out Russia, and GQ Russia.

=== Box office ===
The film has grossed 1.48 billion rubles (US$25 million) in Russia and was the tenth highest-grossing film in the country in 2016. The film grossed 398 million rubles ($6.7 million) across four territories in the 5-8 Jan. weekend, which earned it a place in the top 10 movies of the international box office.

In Russia, rental was started on 29 December 2016. The total box office grossing of the painting in Russia and the CIS amounted to 1,534,409,689 RUB, in other countries - less than 400,000 US dollars. According to film critic Victor Matizen, this means a box-office failure of the film, since cinemas leave half of the fees to themselves, and the remaining amount does not cover the budget of the film.

== See also ==
- Furious (2017 film), or Legend of Kolovrat, a Russian historical fantasy action film
- Cinema of Russia
