= Feud of the Sviatoslavichi =

Late 10th-century war of succession in Kievan Rus'

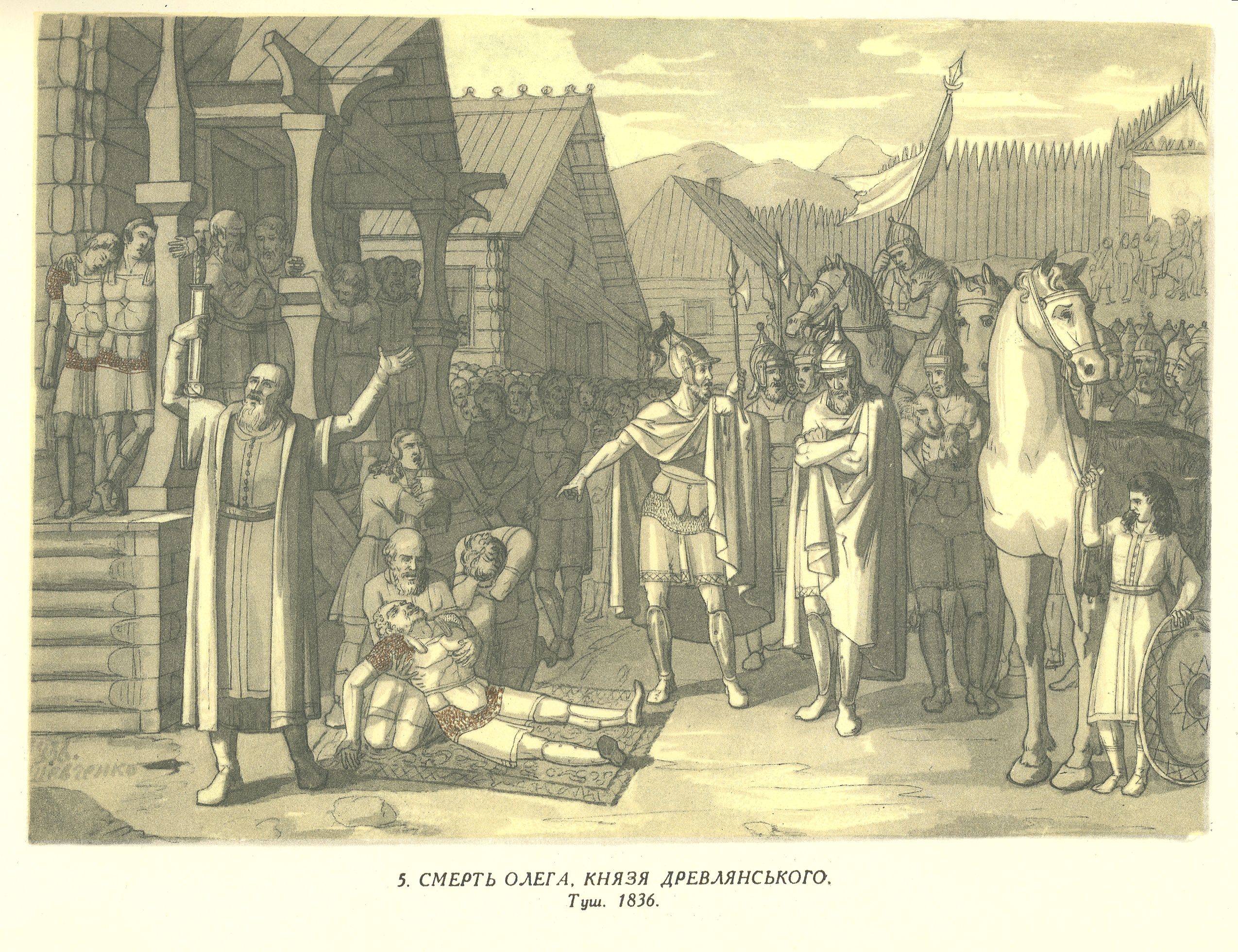
- The Death of Oleg, Prince of Dereva (1836). Drawing made by Taras Shevchenko.
Date	c. late 970s–980
Location	Kievan Rus'
Result	Victory of Volodimer: Volodimer became the prince of Kievan Rus'

Belligerents
Yaropolk's coalition: Kiev; Polotsk; Varangians	Oleg's coalition: Drevlians; Volodimer's coalition: Novgorod

Commanders and leaders
Yaropolk X Rogvolod †; Sveneld # Lyut X	Oleg †; Volodimer; Dobrynya

The Feud of the Sviatoslavichi was a war of succession in Kievan Rus' in the late 970s (the precise dating is uncertain), between the sons of the Kievan prince Sviatoslav I Igorevich (died 972), for 'eldership' after the death of their father.

== Course ==
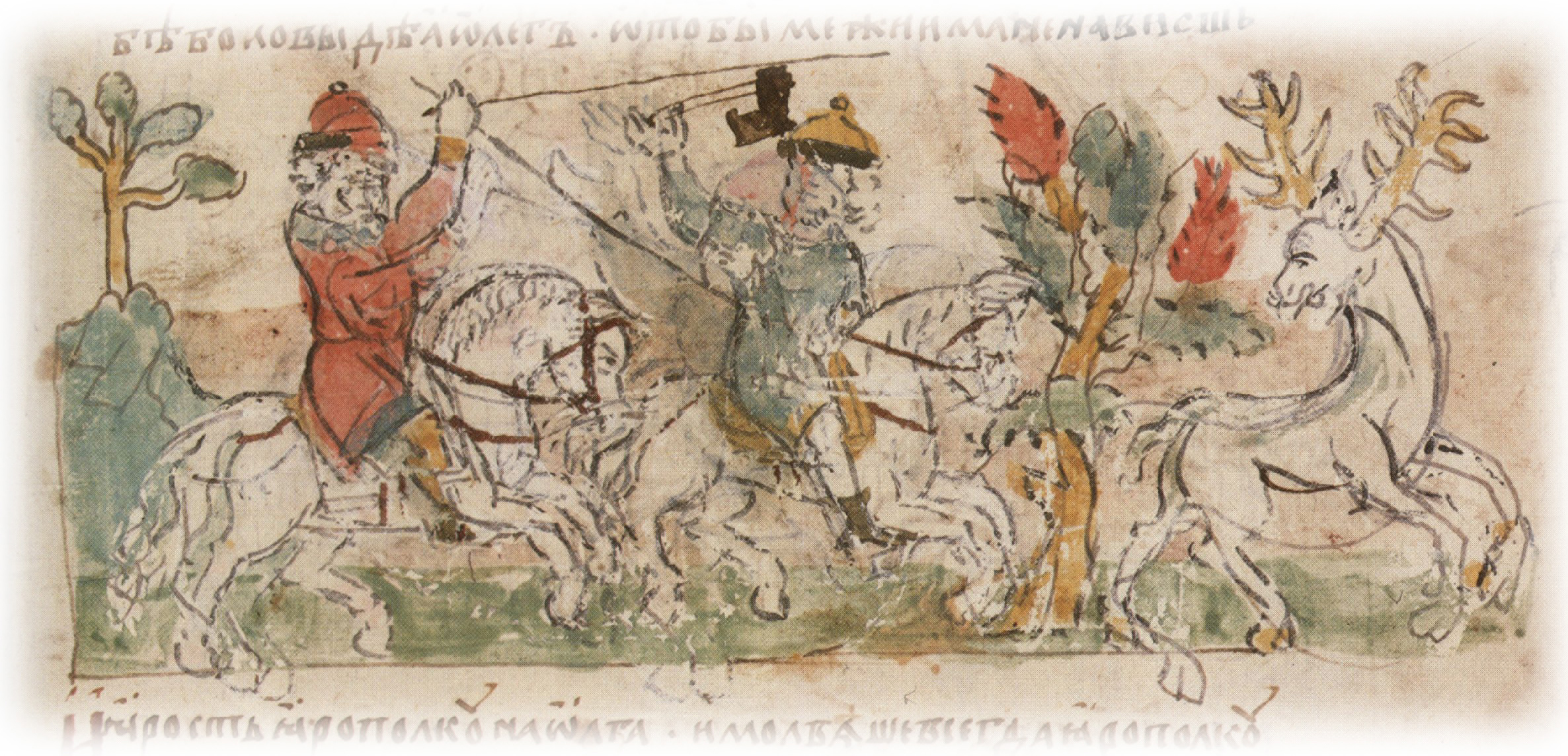
Oleg's murder of Lyut', son of Sveneld. Miniature from the Radziwiłł Chronicle (15th century)

Shortly before his death, according to the Primary Chronicle (PVL) in the year 6478 (970), Sviatoslav had appointed his sons over various parts of Kievan Rus': Yaropolk as prince of Kiev (modern Kyiv), Oleg as prince of Dereva, and Volodimer as prince of Novgorod.

After the death of Sviatoslav, a war broke out between his sons. The casus belli appears to have been an incident mentioned sub anno 6483 (975), in which Oleg of Dereva killed the Kievan boyar Lyut' (Old East Slavic: Лютъ) son of Sveneld (alias Svenald or Sveinald) for trespassing on his hunting grounds.

In the year 6483 (975), the son of Sveinald, Lyut by name, was devoted to hunting, and went out of Kiev to chase wild beasts in the forest. Oleg once saw him, and inquired who he was. He was informed that it was the son of Sveinald; then he rode up and killed him, for Oleg was hunting too. Therefore there sprung up a feud between Yaropolk and Oleg, and Sveinald was continually egging Yaropolk on to attack his brother and seize his property, because he wished to avenge his son.

— Primary Chronicle, translation Cross & Sherbowitz-Wetzor (1953)

Incited by Lyut's father Sveneld, Yaropolk decided to take revenge for him, and eventually in 6485 (977) went to war against his brother Oleg. According to the PVL, Oleg's troops were compelled to flee from Yaropolk's advancing forces, retreating into the fortified town of Vruchii. However, during the stampede to cross the bridge over the moat, Oleg fell off and died. Upon receiving news of Oleg's demise, Yaropolk pushed on towards Novgorod to defeat his other brother Volodimer, who fled to the Varangians in Scandinavia. Yaropolk then appointed a governor in Novgorod and reigned in Rus' alone.

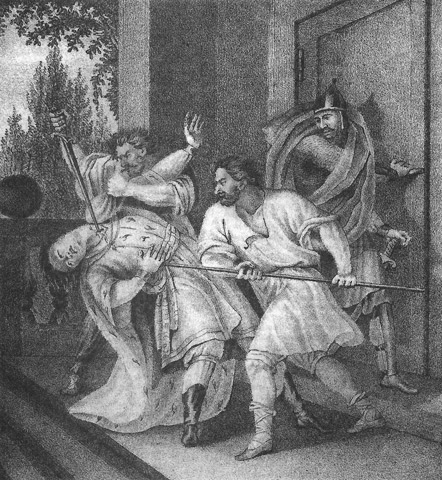
Murder of Yaropolk (1800s). Boris Chorikov.

Having gathered an army, Volodimer went back to his brother in the year 6488 (980) to regain the throne, reportedly sending intermediaries to tell Yaropolk: "Volodimer is moving against you, prepare to fight." The PVL then narrates that after landing ashore, Volodimer sought to arrange a marriage with Rogned', daughter of prince Rogvolod of Polotsk, in an apparent move to gain more allies against Yaropolk. Upon her allegedly haughty refusal, Volodimer took Polotsk by force, killed Rogvolod and his two sons, abducting and forcibly marrying Rogned' anyway. Encircling the capital city of Kiev thereafter, Volodimer began negotiations with Yaropolk, but in the midst of peace talks, Yaropolk's commander Blud betrayed him by delivering the city to Volodimer by deception. Later on, Yaropolk was killed by two Varangians in Volodimer's service. Thus, Volodimer established sole reign over Kievan Rus'.

== Later legend ==
According to a later tradition, only found in the Suzdalian Chronicle under the year 1128, the daughter of Rogvolod was named "Gorislava" rather than Rogned', she was raped by Volodimer before her parents' eyes, and Gorislava later ordered her son Iziaslav to commit a (failed) assassination attempt on Volodimer in revenge. Most modern scholars agree that this later story was invented for political purposes, deriving from a later Novgorodian tradition that tried to assert the superiority of Yaroslav's descendants over Rogvolod's. It is safe to say that Rogned' and Gorislava were not the same woman (if the latter existed at all), and this later legendary story never happened.

== Bibliography ==
=== Primary sources ===
- Primary Chronicle (c. 1110s).
  - Cross, Samuel Hazzard; Sherbowitz-Wetzor, Olgerd P. (1953). The Russian Primary Chronicle, Laurentian Text. Translated and edited by Samuel Hazzard Cross and Olgerd P. Sherbowitz-Wetzor (PDF). Cambridge, Massachusetts: The Mediaeval Academy of America. p. 325. (First edition published in 1930. The first 50 pages are a scholarly introduction.)
  - Thuis, Hans (2015). Nestorkroniek. De oudste geschiedenis van het Kievse Rijk (in Dutch). Nijmegen: Uitgeverij Vantilt. p. 304. ISBN 9789460042287.
  - Ostrowski, Donald; Birnbaum, David J. (7 December 2014). "Rus' primary chronicle critical edition – Interlinear line-level collation". pvl.obdurodon.org (in Church Slavic). Archived from the original on 28 April 2025.

=== Literature ===
- Історія України / Упор.: С. Крупчан, Т. Корольова, О. Скопенко, О. Іванюк. — 5-е вид., переробл. і доповн. —К.: ТОВ "КАЗКА", 2010 — 736 с. —іл., табл. — (Серія "Новий довідник"). ISBN 978-966-8055-18-8
- Butler, Francis (2012). "The "Legend of Gorislava" (not "Rogned'" or "Rogneda"): An Edition, Commentary, and Translation". Dubitando: Studies in History and Culture in Honor of Donald Ostrowski (PDF). Bloomington: Slavica Publishers. pp. 335–352. ISBN 9780893574048.
- Koptev, Aleksandr (2010). "Ritual and History: Pagan Rites in the Story of the Princess' Revenge (the Russian Primary Chronicle, under 945–946)". Mirator. 11 (1): 1–54.
- Martin, Janet (2007). Medieval Russia: 980–1584. Second Edition. E-book. Cambridge: Cambridge University Press. ISBN 978-0-511-36800-4.
