= Joakim Nätterqvist =

Swedish actor (born 1974)

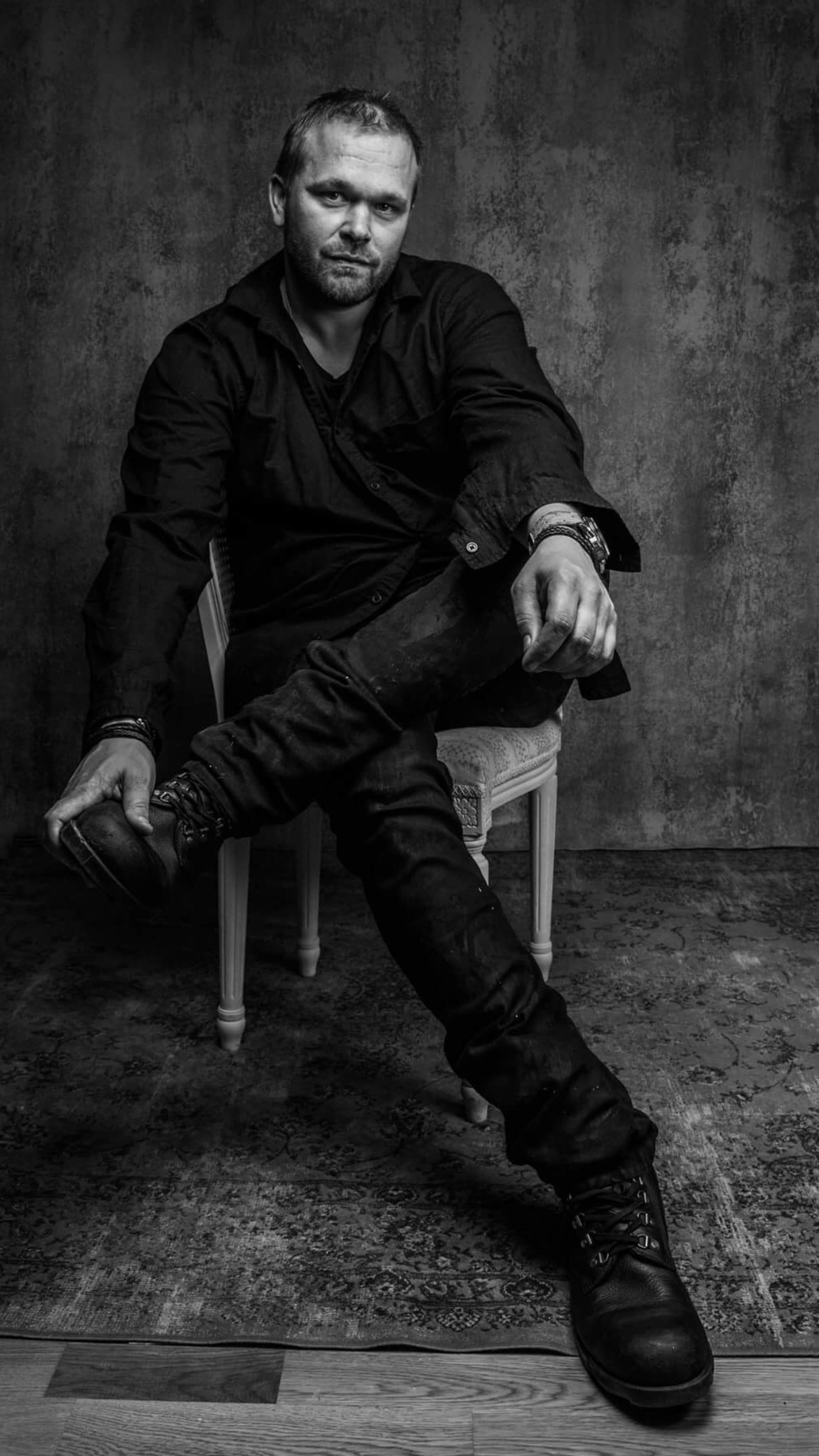

Dag Joakim Tedson Nätterqvist (Swedish pronunciation: [ˈjûːakɪm ˈnɛ̂tːɛrˌkvɪst]; born 24 October 1974) is a Swedish actor, theatre director, musical artist, singer, and acting coach.

== Background ==
Nätterqvist was born in Gamla Uppsala. He is the son of competitive equestrians Ted and Pia Levin Nätterqvist and grew up on Flammabyggets equestrian farm outside Laholm. Nätterqvis learned to ride aged four and competed in show jumping as a child and teenager. He is the grandson of Swedish show jumping rider and trainer Dag Nätterqvist. He also played ice hockey and football. After attending several smaller drama institutes, he graduated from the Stockholm Academy of Dramatic Arts in Stockholm in 2001. He landed a three-year stint with Stockholm City Theatre, where he appeared in, among others, Hamlet and A View from the Bridge. He also appeared in Lars Norén's play Terminal at The National Theatre Company.

He landed his first leading TV role in the 2002 mini-series Stackars Tom.

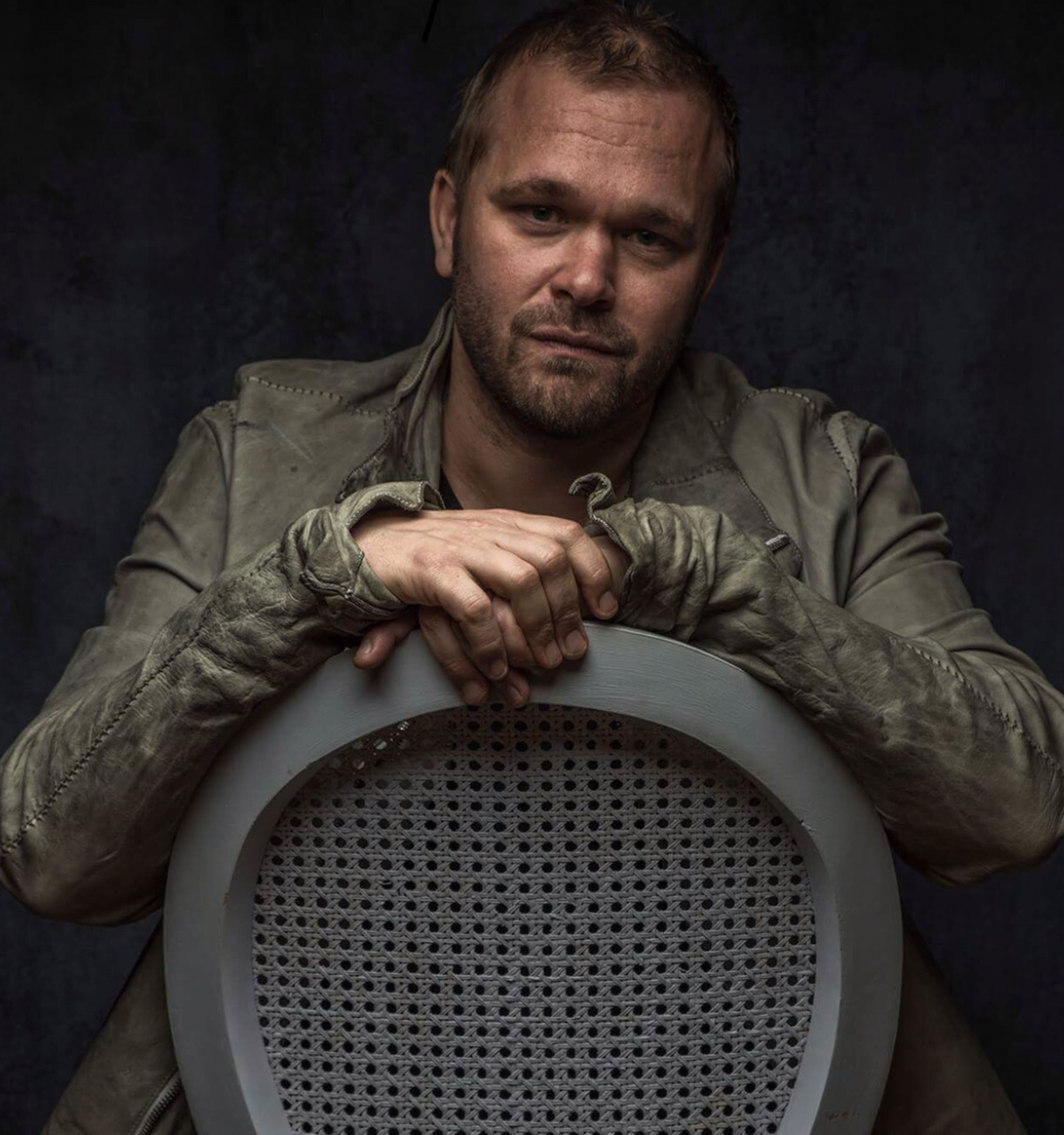

=== Arn: Knight Templar ===
Nätterqvist has since then moved on to television and film. He had his big breakthrough in 2007 when he starred in the movie Arn – The Knight Templar, its sequel and the six-part television series. Nätterqvist played the leading role of crusading knight Arn Magnusson. Once the stunt team realized how well Nätterqvist could ride, he ended up performing his own horse stunts. He also benefitted from previous classes in olympic fencing for several past theatre productions, and his general interest in fencing (he was a special guest and speaker at the 2012 Swedish Competitive Fencing Convention).

Nätterqvist was trained in medieval weapons and longbow archery by Steve Ralphs, costume armourer and archery coach for Game of Thrones, Wrath of the Titans and Ridley Scott's Robin Hood.

This was the most expensive movie project in the history of Swedish film and was shot in English and Swedish, on location in Sweden, Scotland and Morocco with an international cast. The production was headed by Svensk Filmindustri in conjunction with Film i Väst, TV4 (Sweden), Telepool (Germany), Danmarks Radio (Denmark), YLE (Finland) and TV 2 (Norway).

The Arn project has been shown on television in many areas of the world. When it was shown in France on France 4, it went up against Showtime's historical drama The Tudors, on NRJ12 in the same time slot, and rated with a higher numbers of viewers.

=== Recent projects ===
Nätterqvist has continued work with television, theatre and film. In 2011, he co-starred in the Swedish film With Every Heartbeat/Kiss Me and award-winning music video director Adam Berg's film In. Americans saw him in the 2011 season finale of USA Network's series Covert Affairs.

Since the fall of 2011 Nätterqvist has been playing fashion designer and love interest Hugo Cronstedt in TV3's popular romantic comedy-drama Elsas Värld. The show came back for a second series in 2013 and consisted of 20 episodes, lasting into the spring of 2014.

In December 2016 the Russian medieval epic Viking premiered. Nätterqvist spent most of the previous summer shooting on location in Russia. Nätterqvist has a large supporting role as a Viking chieftain and mercenary. The film has taken around $25 million at the box office in Russia and the Commonwealth of Independent States, becoming the top-grossing Russian film to be released in 2016. It was released in western Europe on Amazon Prime and Sky Digital

In July 2017 Nätterqvist again participated in the Norwegian outdoor musical Eplene i messehagen, this time in a different role than what he played in 2014.

In 2016 Nätterqvist joined the 5th season of the police procedural Maria Wern as Torwalds, a Stockholm police detective, and reprised this role in season 6 (2018).

During the fall of 2018, Nätterqvist was shooting the TV-pilot for Skärvor, an outlaw motorcycle club drama-thriller, from producers Susanne Hörnquist & Magnus G Bergström. He played the part of Stefan Andreason, president of Rubicon MC

In 2019 Nätterqvist joined the 4th season of popular crime drama Gåsmamman portraying the foster dad Patrik Thorin. This season had its premier on streaming service C More in November 2019, and on Kanal 7 the following year.

Nätterqvist played Little John in Robin Hood-the Musical, which premiered in October 2019 in Stockholm, followed by a Swedish tour running into 2020, visiting over 20 different cities.

In March 2022 he will be seen as Peter Rosenberg in Beck - 58 minuter, a special episode of long running Nordic Noir series Beck.

During the fall of 2022 and till the summer of next year he will be filming the TV-series Ronia, the Robber's Daughter in Lithuania and Gothenburg, playing the highwayman Dockas, and based on the fantasy book by the Astrid Lindgren, adapted for television by Hans Rosenfeldt, the writer behind The Bridge and Marcella.

In September 2023 it was announced Nätterqvist would star as King Moryn in The Little Mermaid-The Musical.

== Other projects ==
Nätterqvist was voted sexiest man in Sweden 2007 by Plaza Magazine. He has been active raising money for UNICEF. Nätterqvist is one of the founders of Actors Studio Stockholm, a two-year drama academy.

== Music ==
He has a Britpop/Indie pop band named Narcissistic Street. They released the CD Soldier in Me in 2008. The album was recorded before he made his big breakthrough as the medieval knight and had to postpone the album release due to massive Arn project. In December 2011 the band performed at the European premiere of David Fincher's The Girl with the Dragon Tattoo.

Nätterqvist sings on two songs on post-punk revivalists The Ohios album Every Sorrow Claims Happiness. One of the tracks, "Let My Legs Walk" is featured in the soundtrack to horror-comedy American Burger.

On 21 December 2017, Nätterqvist released the Christmas-themed single "Jule ljus" on iTunes and Spotify. A second song "En sequined sen" dropped in late April 2018.

In late 2024 he will release new music his new project Tedson.

== Reality television ==
Nätterqvist has also worked with unscripted television. In 2010 he almost won the Swedish version of Let's Dance for Comic Relief with his interpretation of Lady Gaga's Bad Romance.

In spring 2011, he co-hosted the TV cooking show Klockan åtta hos stjärnorna. He has also participated in other shows such as Herr och Fru, Doobidoo and Fenomen med Uri Geller.

In late April 2020, Nätterqvist and musical artist and model/TV personality Tilde Fröling were celebrity guest stars on season finale of the Swedish edition of Who Wants to Be a Millionaire to raise money for the Swedish Cancer Foundation.

== Personal life ==
Nätterqvist lives in Gamla stan, the medieval section of Stockholm. He has a son with actress Cecilia Häll, who recently provided the voice for one of the animated characters in the Swedish release of The Good Dinosaur and also acted alongside his father in the Robin Hood musical. He has a second child with Vendela Drammeh born in late 2019.

Nätterqvist is bilingual in Swedish and English.

He is the co-founder of Actors Studio Stockholm, a two-year academic program, that incorporates and the Meisner and Chekhov techniques with Swedish stage traditions. Nätterqvist has also taught drama at several other schools in Sweden, after-school drama coaching for teens, weekend workshops, and with unemployed actors via the Public Employment Service.

Nätterqvist is a frequent guest at Renaissance and Medieval festivals, and Viking markets throughout Sweden, including Vätteryd Historical Market, Wenngarn Medieval Festival, Venngarn Castle Medieval Festival and Sala Silver Mine Festival etc. He will sign autographs, sometimes participate in a jousting tournament and dubbing children as Knights. etc. In June late 2022, he arranged his own Medieval and Viking Market at Flammabygget Equestrian Estate.

== Filmography ==
Cinema appearances
| Year | Title | Role | Notes |
|---|---|---|---|
| 2001 | Deadline | Photographer | |
| 2001 | Tsatsiki: Friends Forever | Niclas | |
| 2002 | We Can Be Heroes! | Coach | |
| 2007 | Arn – The Knight Templar | Arn Magnusson | Nominated: European Film Awards Audience Award |
| 2008 | Arn – The Kingdom at Road's End | Arn Magnusson | Guldbagge Award: Audience Award |
| 2011 | In | Håkan | Best Short Film at 2011 Gothenburg Film Festival |
| 2011 | Kiss Me (With Every Heartbeat ) | Tim Bratthall | 2012 Guldbagge Award from Swedish Film Institute. Audience Award, Breakthrough Section, at the American Film Institute Fest |
| 2014 | Inte som på film (Not Like the Movies) | Tommy | Young adult crime family drama |
| 2016 | Viking | Khevding | Russian historic drama |
| 2018 | Maria Wern | DCI Torwalds | |
| 2019 | Det sista som dör | Julia's father | By Jacob Wahlqvist and Peter Johansson |
| 2019 | Gåsmamman | Patrik Thorin | Dir. Richard Holm and Joakim Eliasson ( Bigster) |
| 2020 | Plocka tänder med trasiga fingrar | Police Commissioner Henning Dickermann | Independent Neo-Victorian/Victorian era fantasy/horror thriller |

Television appearances
| Year | Title | Role | Notes |
|---|---|---|---|
| 1998 | Aspiranterna | Moses | |
| 1998 | Beck | Young Jon Anders | Beck – Öga för öga |
| 1998 | Waiting for the Tenor/Veranda för en tenor | The Production Assistant | |
| 2002 | Spung | Ana-Maria's boyfriend | 4 episodes, Season I |
| 2002 | Stackars Tom | Tom | |
| 2003 | Talismanen | The Thief | Produced & co-written by Henning Mankell |
| 2004 | Linné och hans apostlar | Daniel Solander | |
| 2004 | Skeppsholmen | | |
| 2005 | Kommissionen | News anchor | |
| 2008 | Häxdansen | Henke | |
| 2008 | Filmen om Arn | Arn Magnusson | Television program |
| 2009 | Life in Fagervik Village | Rasmus Svensk | Joined cast with series 2, 11 episodes |
| 2010 | Arn: The Series | Arn Magnusson | 6 episodes |
| 2011 | Covert Affairs | Little Magnus | 2011 Season Finale, USA Network |
| 2011 | Nils Holgerssons wunderbare Reise | Tore Berggren | Mini-series, German TV broadcaster ARD |
| 2011–2012 | Elsas Värld | Hugo Cronsted | Season 1 |
| 2012 | Hellenius Hörna | The Shining Knight | Special Guest Star |
| 2013 | Fort Boyard | | |
| 2013 | Tänk om ryktet är sant | Erik | 90-minute single drama |
| 2013–2014 | Elsas Värld 2 | Hugo Cronsted | |
| 2014 | Star Wars Rebels | Kanan Jarrus | Swedish voice (Season 1) |
| 2016 | Maria Wern | DCI Torwalds | Season 5 |
| 2016–2017 | Star Wars Rebels | Kanan Jarrus | Swedish voice (Season 2) |
| 2018 | Maria Wern | Torwalds | Season 6 |
| 2018 | Skärvor | Stefan Andersson | Pilot based on LiseLotte Divelli's novel. |
| 2019 | Gåsmamman | Patrik Thorin | Season 4 on TV 4 |
| 2020 | Vad hände egentligen på...? | Mr. Bartender | Supernatural historical anthology series |
| 2022 | Beck - 58 minuter | Peter Rosenberg | Special episode of classic Nordic Noir series detailing hostage drama in real time |
| 2024 | Ronia, the Robber's Daughter | Björn | Netflix-series based on the fantasy book by Swedish author Astrid Lindgren |

=== Selected stage appearances ===
- A Doll's House, Stockholm Academy of Dramatic Arts
- Inatt tänder vi månen, Stockholm Academy of Dramatic Arts
- Amadeus, Stockholm City Theatre
- The Cherry Orchard, Stockholm City Theatre
- Järn (musical) Stockholm City Theatre
- Din Stund på Jorden, Stockholm City Theatre
- Hamlet, Stockholm City Theatre
- Dostoyevsky's The Idiot, Stockholm City Theatre
- Mio, My Son,, Stockholm City Theatre
- The Full Monty (musical), Stockholm City Theatre
- As You Like It, Stockholm City Theatre
- A View from the Bridge, Stockholm City Theatre
- Piaf, Stockholm City Theatre
- Amy's View, Stockholm City Theatre
- Som Glöd under Snö (musical) Gottsunda Teater
- Terminal National Swedish Touring Theatre
- North of The Border (musical) Teater De Vill
- The Taming of the Shrew, Sheakespear at Gräsgården Manor
- Ken Ludwig's Leading Ladies, Mariebergsskogen Karlstad
- Nu är det klippt! Dröse & Norberg Theatre Company
- Snow White: The Musical Dröse & Norberg Theatre Company
- I Ljus & Mörker (musical) Jon Anderzon/Studieförbundet Vuxenskolan Gävleborg.
- Elden (2014 musical) Leif Stinnerbom / Bergstaden Sylvan Theater
- Eplene i messehagen (2016 musical) Paul Ottar Haga / Malm Sylvan Theater
- Elden (2017 musical) Paul Ottar Haga / Bergstaden Sylvan Theater
- Eplene i messehagen (2018 musical) Malm Sylvan Theater
- People of Hemsö (Hemsöborna) (2019 stage play) Stallebrottet på Bohus Malmön Sylvan theater
- Robin Hood: The Musical (Fall 2019-Spring 2020) Dröse & Norberg Theatre Company
- Slottspel i 1600-tals miljo (2021 actor) directed by Ika Nord, Halmstad Castle Outdoor Theater
- Eplene i messehagen ( 2021 Director and actor ) written by Rasmus Rohde, Bergstaden Sylvan Theater
- Sensationer på slottet (2022 actor), Halmstad Castle Outdoor Theater
- Eplene i messehagen ( 2022 Director and acting in the role of Walter Jønsson ) written by Rasmus Rohde, Bergstaden Sylvan Theater
- Hagbard and Signe (2023 fencing instructor) Asige outdoor theatre and food festival
- The Little Mermaid-The Musical (Spring 2024) Dröse & Norberg Theatre Company
- Eplene i messehagen (Fall 2024, Director and actor), Bergstaden Sylvan Theater

=== Selected podcast appearances ===
- Richards and Mckie Present Randompedia
