= Ralfs =

Ralfs is a surname. Notable people with the surname include:

- Dominic Ralfs (born 1967), English cricketer
- John Ralfs (1807–1890), English botanist
- Otto Ralfs (1892–1955), German collector of classical modern art

== See also ==
- Ralphs (surname), an English surname
- Alfred Rahlfs (1865–1935), German Biblical scholar
