= Ralphs (surname) =

Ralphs is an English surname. There are many notable people with the surname, and they include:

- Alastair Charles Ralphs, known as A-1 (born 1977), Canadian wrestler and former bodybuilder
- Bert Ralphs (1896–1942), English footballer
- George Ralphs (1850–1914), American businessman
- Lincoln Ralphs (1909–1978), British education officer and student activist
- Mick Ralphs (1944–2025), English guitarist, vocalist and songwriter
- Steve Ralphs (born 1955), English bowyer and film armorer
- Tony Ralphs (born 1943), American sprint canoer

== See also ==
- Ralfs, people with this name
