= Thilo Maatsch =

German painter

Thilo Friedrich Maatsch (born 13 August 1900 in Braunschweig; died 20 March 1983 in Königslutter) was a German artist and an exponent of abstract art, constructivism, and concrete art.

== Life ==
Whilst visiting exhibitions in his youth he came in touch with art. Especially the upcoming modernism affected him and his work of art a lot. 18 years after his birth he founded with Johannes Molzahn and Rudolf Jahns the "Gesellschaft der Freunde junger Kunst" (Society of the adorer of young art) which was joined by several distinguished artists e.g. Lyonel Feininger and Paul Klee. The collector Otto Ralfs supported this organisation and Kandinsky designed the signet. Maatsch's circle of friends and acquaintances ranked among the aforementioned artists, László Moholy-Nagy, William Wauer and Lothar Schreyer. Kandinsky nurtured Maatsch's talent and he admired him like his own father. Due to financial problems it was not possible for Maatsch to study at the Bauhaus, because of his young family he also had to nourish. But his desire for studies remained unfulfilled. Moholy-Nagy, Kandinsky and Klee permitted him to study in their studios. Most probably Kandinsky together with the Bauhaus figured out permission for Maatsch to attend Bauhaus in Berlin and Weimar in his holidays (he worked as a teacher in Königslutter) without paying fees.

In 1925 he joined the November Group and from this year onwards till 1932 he participated annually in the renowned Große Berliner Kunstausstellung. In 1927 Herwarth Walden, one of the most important discoverers and promoters of German avant-garde art in the early twentieth century, arranged for Maatsch an exhibition in his prestigious gallery "Der Sturm". Determined by the Nazi policy his art work was considered as degenerated and he withered on the vine. Maatsch's rediscovery ensued in 1966.

== Public collections ==
- Sprengel Museum, Hanover, Germany
- Museum Ritter, Germany
- City of Salzgitter (art collection), Germany
- Museum Haus Konstruktiv, Zurich Switzerland
- Dubniczay-House, Collection Carl Laszlo (Károly László), Veszprém Hungary
- Indianapolis Museum of Art USA
