= Sveneld =

Semi-legendary 10th-century Varangian warlord

Svenald
- Свѣналдъ

Voivode of Kiev
- Monarchs: Igor I of Kiev; Sviatoslav I
- Succeeded by: Blud

Personal details
- Born: Sveinaldr c. 920s
- Died: c. 970s
- Children: Lyut; Mstisha

Military service
- Allegiance: Kievan Rus'
- Years of service: 940s - 970s
- Rank: Voivode
- Commands: Expedition forces to Caucasian Albania
- Battles/wars: Expedition against Ulichs; Expedition against Caucasian Albania; Expedition against Byzantium (Siege of Dorostolon); Feud of the Sviatoslavichi

Sveneld (also called Svenald or Sveinald; Old Norse: Sveinaldr; Church Slavonic: Свѣналдъ, romanized: Svěnaldŭ or Свѣнелдъ, Svěneldŭ), is a semi-legendary 10th-century Varangian warlord in the service of Sviatoslav I and his family. Most of the information about Sveneld is scarce. He is described as a rich man and a voevoda ("troop commander") of Kievan Rus', but his relation to the reigning Rurikid princes, if it existed, has not been positively established.

== Biography ==
Sveneld started his military career under (or perhaps independently of) Igor of Kiev, when he put to the sword the tribe of Ulichs and secured for himself the right to exact tribute from them and from the Drevlians. The historian Lev Gumilev suggests that Sveneld's enormous fortune, recorded in the Primary Chronicle in 945, was acquired during the 944 expedition of the Rus' against the city of Berdaa in Caucasian Albania, now Azerbaijan, in which Sveneld is presumed to have been the commander-in-chief.

Igor's druzhina became jealous of Sveneld's wealth, and Igor himself attempted to levy additional tribute from the Drevlyans, who had already been paying tribute to Sveneld; the Drevlyans revolted against this further exaction and killed Igor. Aleksey Shakhmatov theorizes that the Drevlyan uprising against Igor was led by Sveneld's son Mstisha. This theory is not universally agreed upon, though.

Igor's successor Svyatoslav seemed to have been on better terms with Sveneld, who was the second in command during his campaigns in Bulgaria and Byzantium. In 971, he was in charge of the defense of Preslav against the Greeks. Although the Byzantine historians John Skylitzes and Leo the Deacon testify that Sphangel (as he was known to them) met his death at Dorostolon the same year, the Slavonic chronicles mention Sveneld's activities several times thereafter.

It has even been suggested that Sveneld's own tales found reflection in the chronicle's account of Svyatoslav's campaigns. For example, not entirely impartial is a passage about Sveneld's attempts to warn Svyatoslav to avoid the Dnieper cataracts on his way back to Kiev. According to the chronicle, Svyatoslav slighted Sveneld's wise advice and was ambushed and killed by the Pechenegs, while the old general successfully returned to Kiev by land.

Sveneld seems to have held much of the true power during the minority of Svyatoslav's son Yaropolk. The chronicle blames him for having fomented a fratricidal war between Yaropolk and his brother Oleg of the Drevlyans. Indeed, Sveneld may have coveted Oleg's Drevlyan lands as his own ancient possession. In later centuries it was said that the war was sparked by Oleg's order to kill Sveneld's son Lyut (Ljótr) when he hunted in the Drevlyan lands which Oleg regarded as his own.

After the death of Lyut Sveneld is not mentioned further in the chronicles. Instead, it is Blud who acts as his successor in command of Yaropolk's army, to become the ultimate traitor of this prince. A chronicle entry dated 977 reports that Prince Yaropolk blamed Voivode Sveneld for the war with Oleg Svyatoslavich. This accusation can be interpreted as possible evidence of his subsequent execution.

== In popular culture ==
Sveneld is a major supporting character in the Soviet historical film The Legend of Princess Olga, played by Ukrainian actor Konstantin Stepankov. Sveneld also appears in the 2016 film Viking as an antagonistic character, played by veteran Russian theatrical actor Maksim Sukhanov.

== Bibliography ==
=== Primary sources ===
- Ostrowski, Donald; Birnbaum, David J. (7 December 2014). "Rus' primary chronicle critical edition – Interlinear line-level collation". pvl.obdurodon.org (in Church Slavic). Archived from the original on 28 April 2025.
- Cross, Samuel Hazzard; Sherbowitz-Wetzor, Olgerd P. (1953) [1930]. The Russian Primary Chronicle, Laurentian Text. Translated and edited by Samuel Hazzard Cross and Olgerd P. Sherbowitz-Wetzor (PDF). Cambridge, Massachusetts: The Mediaeval Academy of America. p. 325.
- Thuis, Hans (2015). Nestorkroniek. De oudste geschiedenis van het Kievse Rijk [Nestor Chronicle: the oldest history of the Kievan Realm] (in Dutch). Nijmegen: Uitgeverij Vantilt. p. 304. ISBN 9789460042287.
