= Eugene Bolkhovitinov =

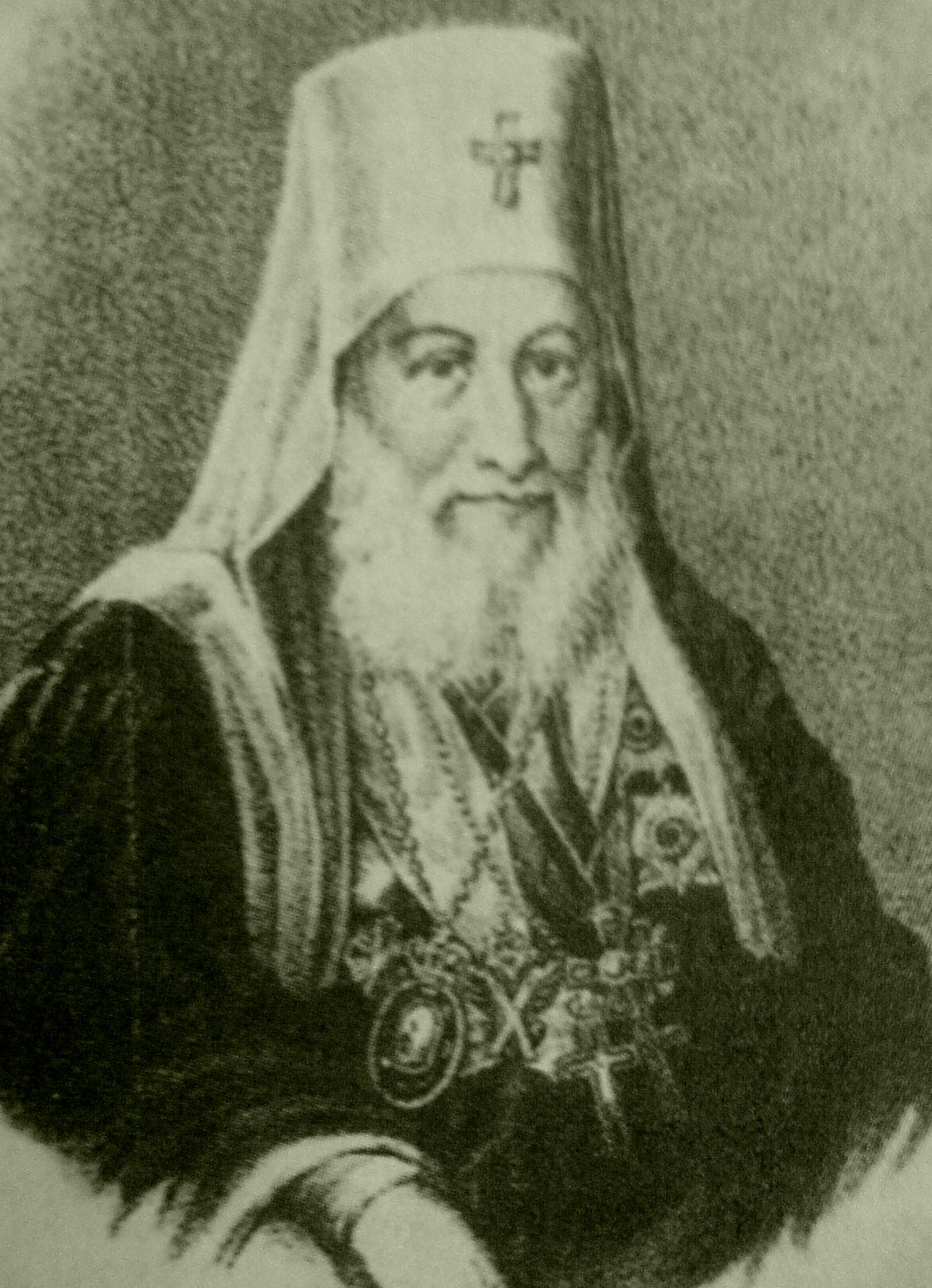
Eugenius of Kiev

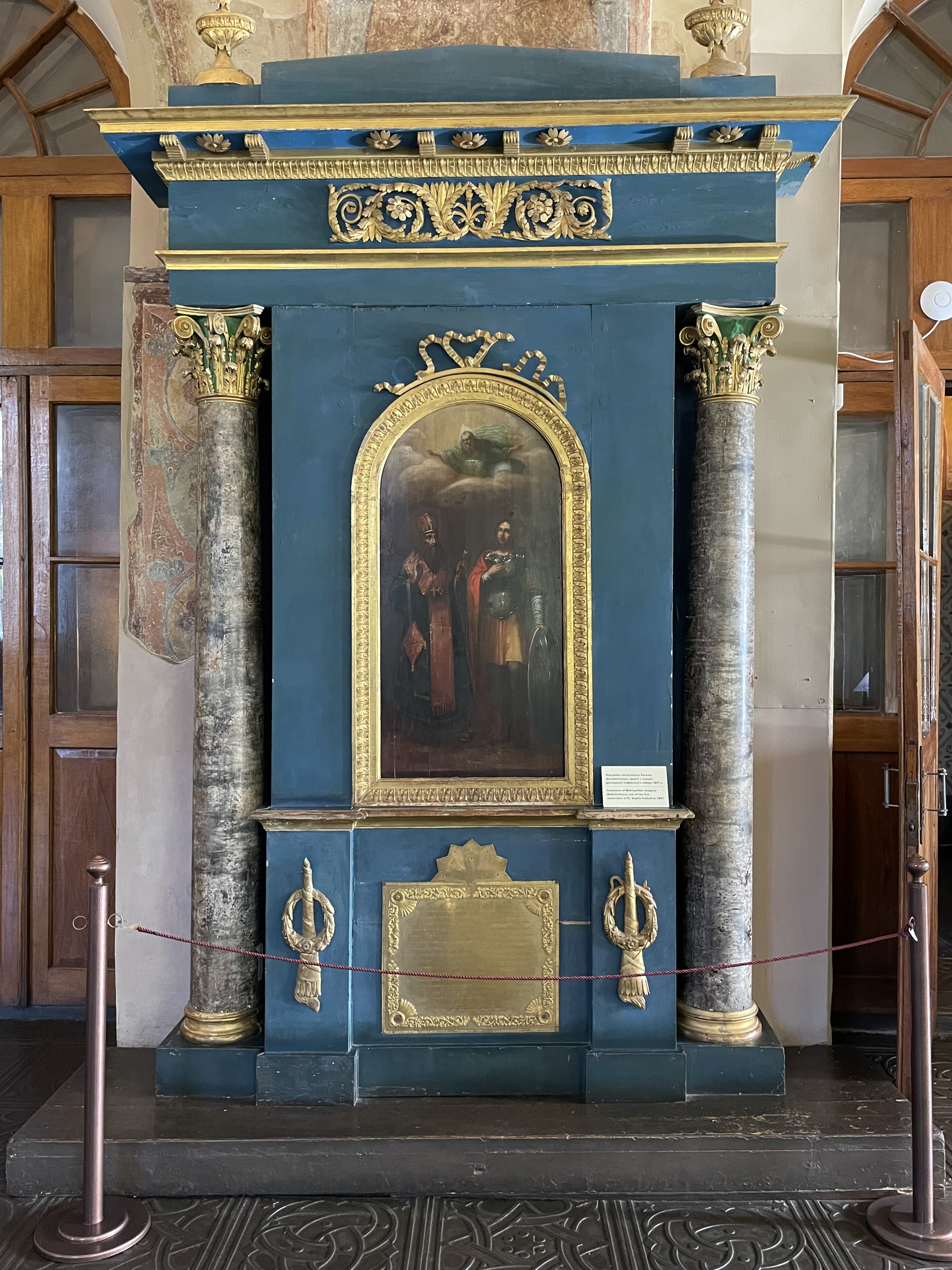
Tombstone of Metropolitan Yevgeniy (Bolkhovitinov), 1837

Metropolitan Eugene (Russian: Митрополит Евгений, secular name: Yevfimy Alekseyevich Bolkhovitinov, Russian: Евфимий Алексеевич Болховитинов; 29 December 1767 [O.S. 18 December]–7 March 1837 [O.S. 23 February]) was the Orthodox Metropolitan of Kiev and Galicia from 1822. Best known as an antiquary and book collector, Bolkhovitinov came from a generation of learned Orthodox monks formed by the Russian Enlightenment.

The son of a Voronezh priest, Bolkhovitinov attended the Slavic Greek Latin Academy and the Moscow University. As a young man he made his living by translating French books for the Novikov printing house. After his wife died, Bolkhovitinov took the tonsure in 1800 and was made a bishop 4 years later.

While living in Novgorod between 1804 and 1808, he published the charter of Mstislav the Great and studied the crypt of the Yuriev Monastery. Though amateur, his archaeological and palaeographical work was highly regarded by a circle of antiquaries close to Count Nikolai Rumyantsev. He also gained the friendship of poet Gavrila Derzhavin, who addressed to him a lengthy idyll, Life in Zvanka (one of the best known poems in the language).

After arriving in Kiev in 1822, Bolkhovitinov resumed his scholarly pursuits. He was responsible for the excavations of the long-demolished Golden Gate and the Church of the Tithes. He assembled a large collection of manuscripts, developed an interest in the history of church music, and compiled the first comprehensive guide to Russian secular writers. He wrote a Life of Saint Tikhon of Zadonsk, entitled A Description of the Life and Asceticism of His Eminence Tikhon, Bishop of Voronezh and Elets, Composed for Those Who Love and Honor the Memory of His Eminence which has been translated from the Russian into English under the Title: The Earliest Lives of St. Tikhon of Zadonsk.

During the Decembrist Revolt he went to Senate Square and urged the rebels to lay down arms. He was buried in the Saint Sophia Cathedral in Kiev.
