= Church of the Tithes =

Former Orthodox Christian church in Kyiv, Ukraine

Church of the Dormition of the Virgin
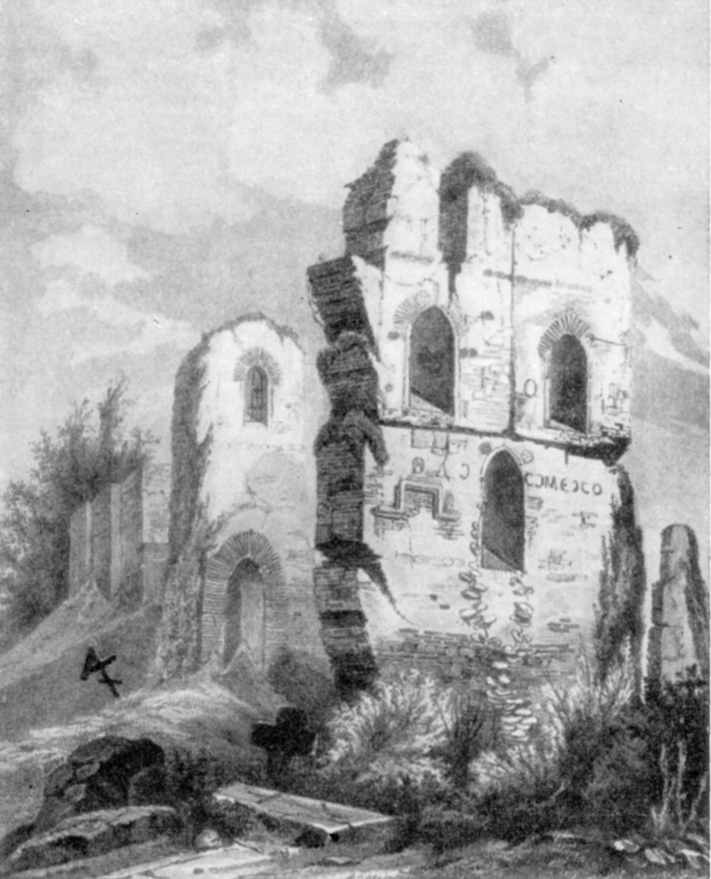
- The ruined Church of the Tithes in the 1650s, drawn by Abraham van Westerveld.

Religion
- Affiliation: Eastern Orthodox Church
- Province: Kyiv Metropolis
- Rite: Ecumenical Patriarchate of Constantinople
- Status: destroyed

Location
- Location: Kyiv, Ukraine
- Interactive map of Church of the Dormition of the Virgin
- Coordinates: 50°27′28″N 30°31′03″E

Architecture
- Type: Cathedral
- Completed: 996
- Materials: Stone

Immovable Monument of National Significance of Ukraine
- Official name: Місто Володимира – дитинець стародавнього Києва з фундаментами Десятинної церкви (Volodymyr's City – dytynets of ancient Kyiv with foundations of the Church of the Tithes)
- Type: Archaeology
- Reference no.: 260010-Н

The Church of the Tithes or Church of the Dormition of the Virgin (Ukrainian: Десятинна Церква, romanized: Desiatynna Tserkva) was the first stone church in Kyiv. Originally it was built by the order of Grand Prince Vladimir (Volodymyr) the Great between 989 and 996 by Byzantine and local workers at the site of death of martyrs Theodor the Varangian and his son Johann. It was originally named the "Church of Our Lady", in honor of the Dormition of the Theotokos. The church was ruined in 1240 during the Siege of Kiev by Mongol armies of Batu Khan.

Vladimir set aside a tithe of his income and property to finance the church's construction and maintenance, which gave the church its popular name.

On an initiative of the Metropolitan of Kyiv Eugene Bolkhovitinov, the church was rebuilt in the mid-19th century, but in 1928 it was once again destroyed by the Soviet regime.

== Medieval church ==
By Vladimir's order, the remains of his grandmother Princess Olga, the first Christian ruler of Rus', were reburied in this church. Vladimir and his wife, Princess Anna, the sister of Byzantine Emperor Basil II, were also buried in the Church of the Tithes.

The church was seriously damaged in the fire of 1017 and was rebuilt by Yaroslav and rededicated in 1039. In 1044, Yaroslav would make the church a mausoleum for Kyivan princes, having the remains of Yaropolk and Oleg baptised and interred.

In 1171 and 1203, the church was sacked and in 1240 it was used by Kyivans as the last refuge while the city was being ravaged by the hordes of Batu Khan, when it finally collapsed from fire. Chernihiv's Saviour Cathedral (1036) is an extant structure supposed to reproduce the dimensions and exterior appearance of the original Church of the Tithes.

== Replacement buildings ==
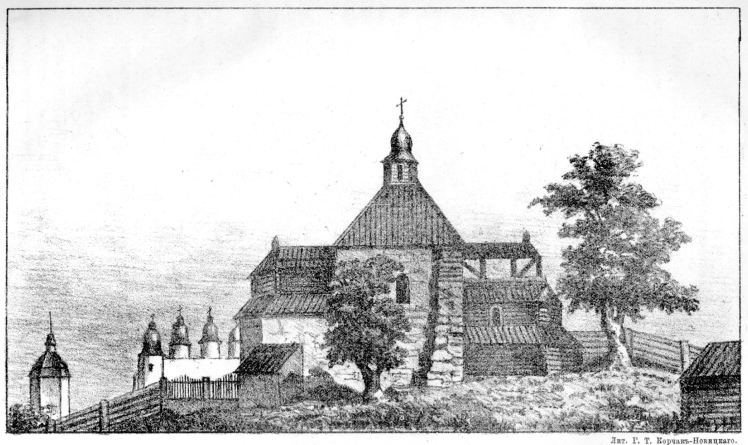
The 17th century Church of the Tithes rebuilt on efforts of Metropolitan Peter Mohyla

During the early 17th century a new church dedicated to Saint Nicholas was constructed on part of the ruins of the original structure by metropolitan Peter Mohyla.

In the early 19th century, another metropolitan bishop, Eugene Bolkhovitinov, had the site excavated. Under his administration, a new church of the Tithes was built in stone (between 1828 and 1842). Its Russian Revival design by Vasily Stasov had some deviations from the medieval original. In 1935, Stasov's church was destroyed by the Soviet authorities.

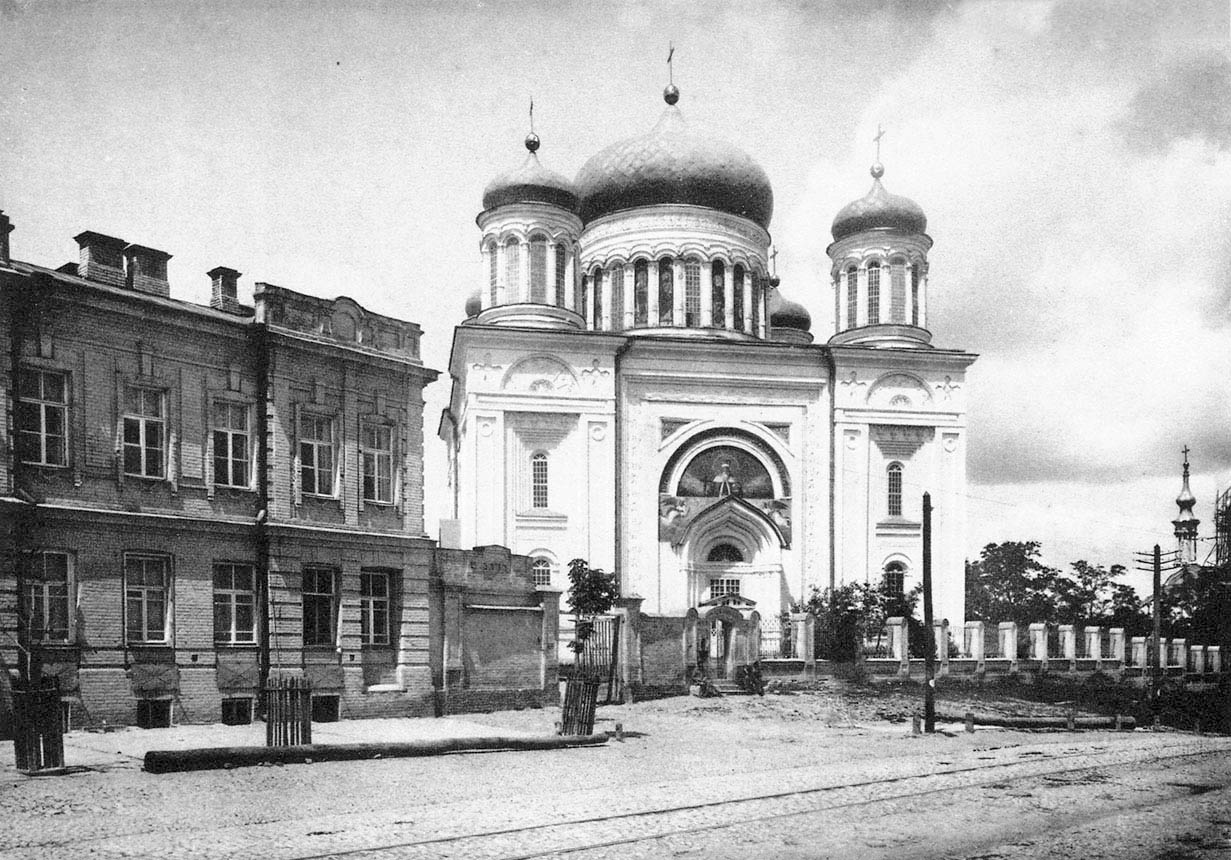
The 19th century Church of the Tithes.

== Plans for reconstruction ==
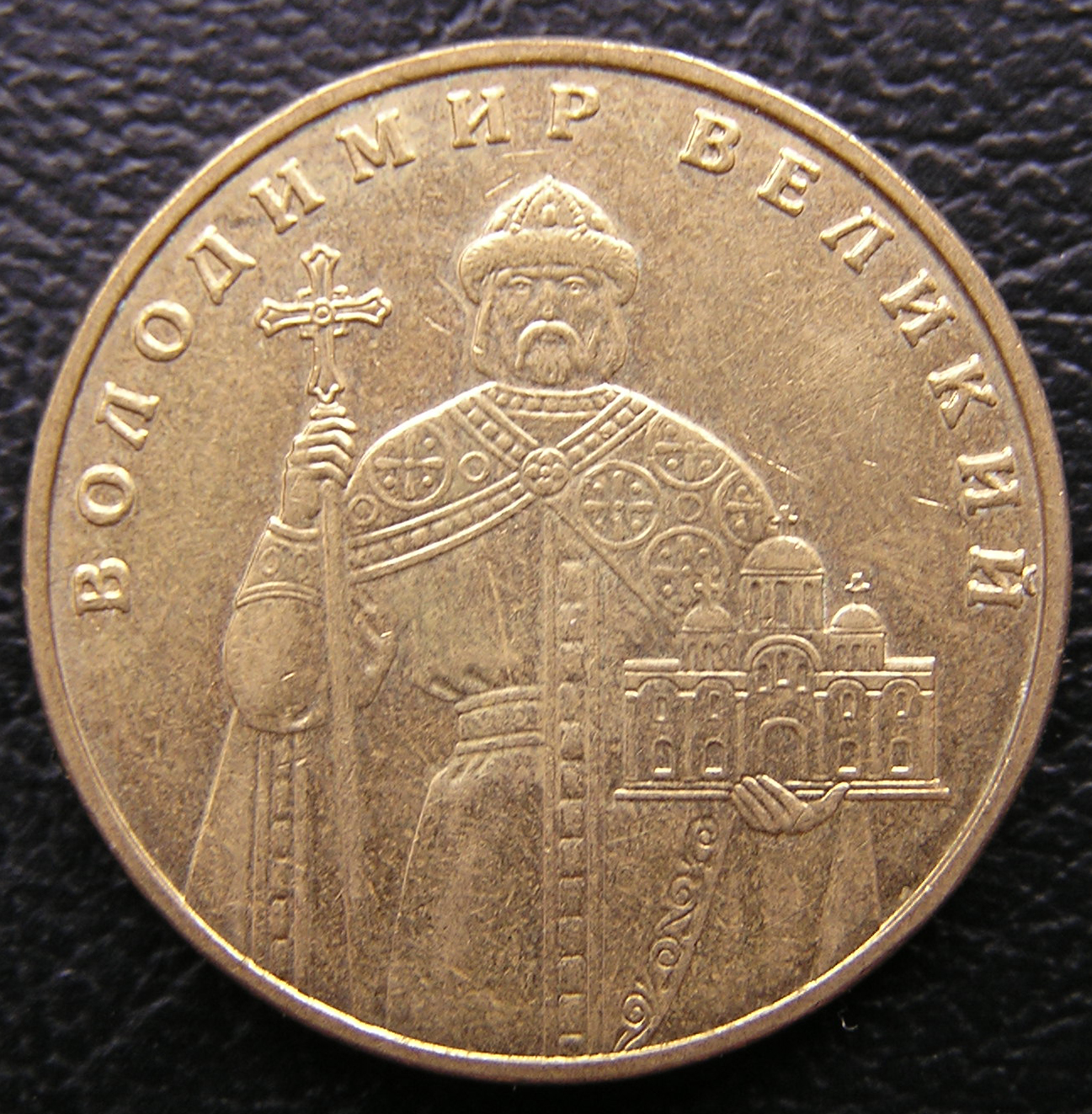
Coin of Ukraine, featuring Volodymyr the Great and a model of the church

A plan to rebuild the church is under consideration in Kyiv. Proponents of reconstruction point out the historical and political importance of rebuilding a church so significant in Eastern Slavic history. Opponents refer to the lack of any documentary descriptions or depictions of the original church, and that excavations were allegedly unable to determine the layout of its foundation. On 3 February 2005, the President of Ukraine, Viktor Yushchenko, signed a decree on the restoration of the Tithe Church, to which the state budget provides nearly ₴90 million ($18 million). In 2006, a temporary Orthodox tabernacle was illegally erected near the Tithe Church on the territory belonging to the National Museum of History of Ukraine without the appropriate documents. In 2007, the tent church was illegally replaced with a wooden one; in 2012, it was also illegally built in stone.

On July 9, 2009, at a meeting of the Holy Synod of the Ukrainian Orthodox Church, it was decided to open the Nativity of the Blessed Virgin Desyatynnyi monastery in Kyiv and appoint as governor Gideon Archimandrite (Charon). In January 2010, Kyiv's Head of Urban Planning, Architecture and Urban Environment Design, Sergii Tsilovalnyk, reported that a platform will be built on the ruins of the Tithe church to serve as a foundation for the new church, which will belong to the Ukrainian Orthodox Church (Moscow Patriarchate).

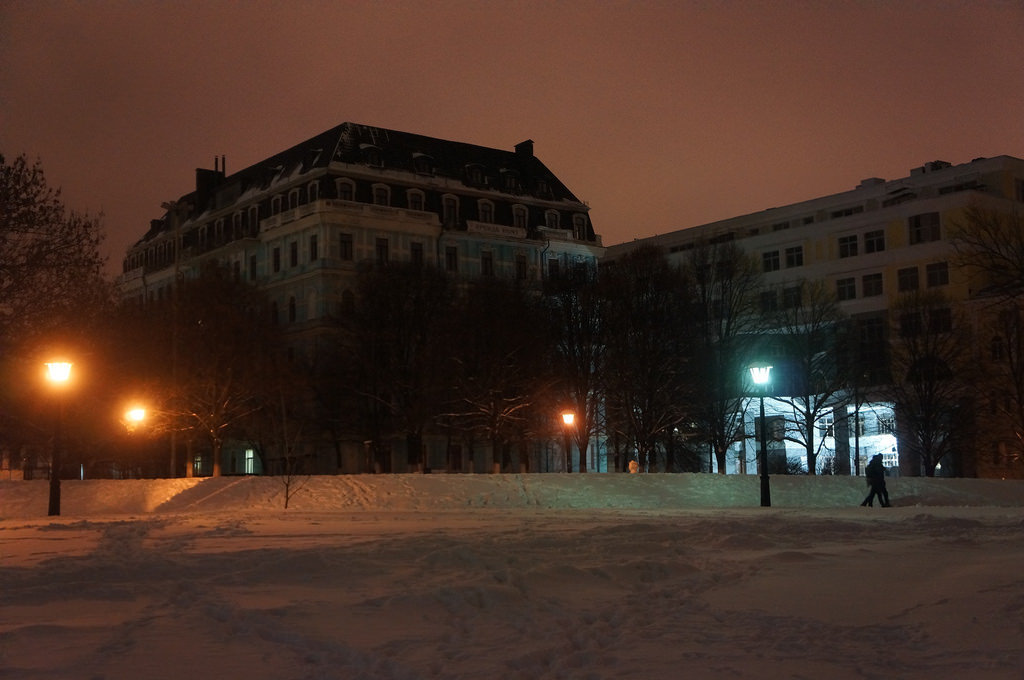
Modern view of the site where the church was once located

In January 2018, two men attempted to set fire to the 2007 (Ukrainian Orthodox Church (Moscow Patriarchate)) wooden church near the Church of the Tithes. Also in January 2018, Ukrainian nationalist groups S14, Traditions and Order and Public Organisation "Sokil" dismantled the information board of this church.

In January 2023, the Ministry of Culture and Information Policy called for the dismantling of the 2007 building in court. According to the ministry, the building was illegally located on the territory of the National Museum of the History of Ukraine. On 15 February 2023 the Commercial Court of Kyiv ordered the dismantling of the 2007 building. On 17 May 2024 the 2007 building was dismantled after a crowdfunding by the museum during which Russian propaganda channels spread fake information that mobile communication in the vicinity was blocked. The company "Smile Construction" that dismantled the building transferred their payment to the Armed Forces of Ukraine for their fight against the Russian invasion of Ukraine.

== List of burials ==
Within its premises the church had a princely tomb.

- Pope Clement I
- Anna of Byzantium
- Vladimir the Great
- Olga of Kiev, reburied from Vyshhorod
- Yaropolk I of Kiev
- Oleg of the Drevlyans

The remnants of Anna of Byzantium and Vladimir the Great were first reburied in the Church of the Saviour and later in the Dormition Cathedral of Kyiv Caves Monastery. Some remnants were reburied in the Saint Sophia's Cathedral.
