= Ulichs =

Tribe of Early East Slavs

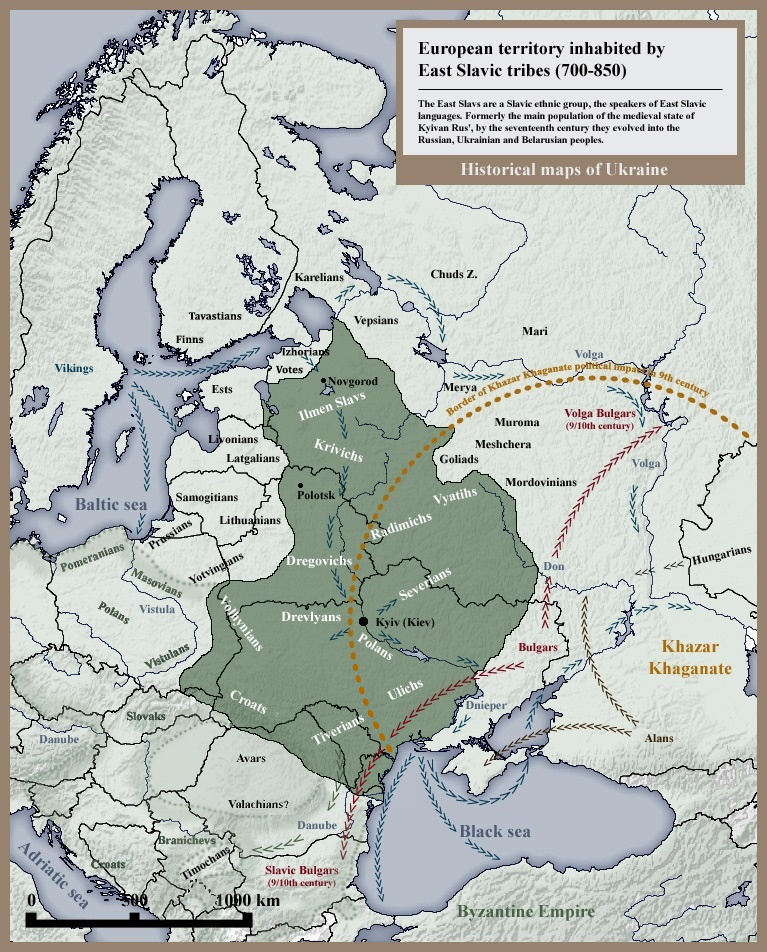
European territory inhabited by East Slavic tribes in 8th and 9th century.

The Uliches or Ugliches (Romanian: Ulici or Uglici; Russian: Уличи or Угличи, Ulichi or Uglichi; Ukrainian: Уличі Угличі, Ulychi or Uhlychi) were a tribe of Early East Slavs who, between the eighth and the tenth centuries, inhabited (along with the Tivertsi) Bessarabia, and the territories along the Lower Dnieper, Bug River and the Black Sea littoral.

== Ethnonym ==
The tribal name comes from a location called Oglos or Onglos by the Byzantine chroniclers Theophanes the Confessor and Nikephoros I of Constantinople, possibly to be identified with Peuce Island. The word may derive from Slavic âgul 'corner', or, according to Steven Runciman, from agul 'enclosure'.

== History ==
They were mentioned as Unlizi by the Bavarian Geographer, described as "populus multus" and having 418 gords-settlements. The Uliches long struggled against the Kievan princes Oleg, Igor and Sviatoslav Igorevich for their independence, until a Kievan commander Sveneld captured their capital, Peresechen (probably not the modern village of Peresechen near Orhei, Moldova), around 940. In the mid-10th century the Ulich lands paid tribute to Sveneld. The Uliches were last mentioned in the 970s.

== See also ==
- Hutsuls
- List of Medieval Slavic tribes
