= Irina, Grand Princess of Kiev =

Irina (Ukrainian: Ірина) (?-990), was a Grand Princess of Kiev by marriage to Vladimir the Great, Grand Prince of Kiev (r. 980–1015). Having been a Greek nun, she was captured by Vladimir's father, Grand Prince Svyatoslav Igorevich of Kiev, during a campaign in Bulgaria and presented by him to his son Yaropolk Svyatoslavich as a concubine. After Vladimir killed Yaropolk, Vladimir impregnated Irina, and, though he was already married, he may have made her his wife by force.

== Issue ==
- Sviatopolk the Accursed (born c. 979), possibly the surviving son of Yaropolk
