= Sofi Fahrman =

Swedish journalist and fashion reporter

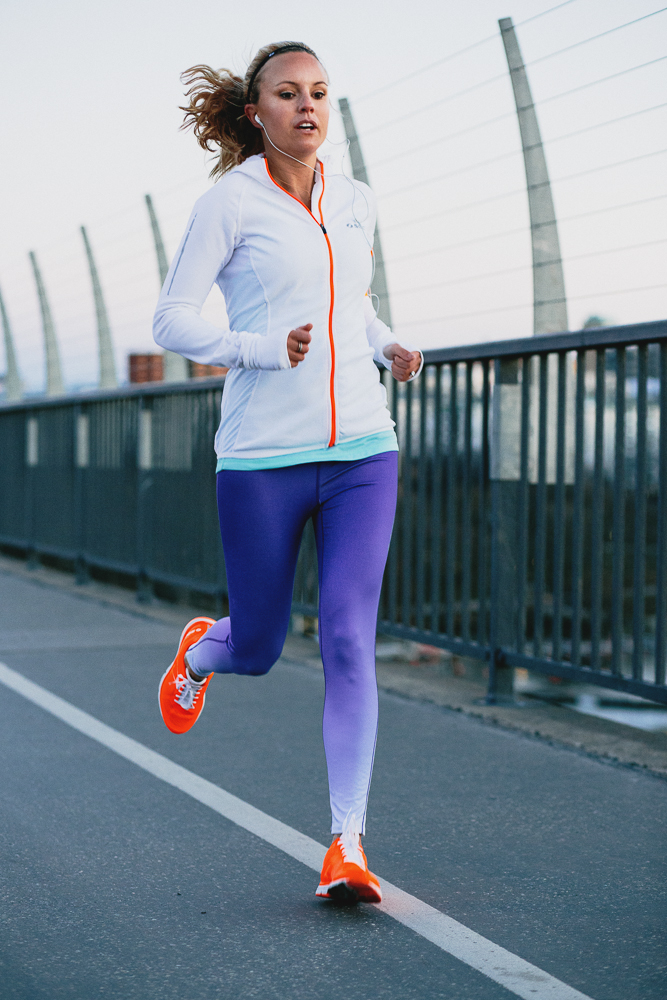
Sofi Fahrman

Sofi Margareta Fahrman (born July 20, 1979, in Stockholm) is a Swedish journalist and fashion reporter for the Aftonbladet newspaper. She runs and owns the blog Sofis Mode on the Aftonbladets official website, and publishes her own fashion magazine, Sofis mode, as a supplement to the Aftonbladet newspaper each week. Fahrman also runs a blog called Sofis snapshots. Before starting Sofis mode she was a celebrity editor for Aftonbladets celebrity and entertainment magazine Klick!. She currently resides in Stockholm.

== Career ==
Fahrman worked for Elle magazine in Sweden for a few years and then went to work for Aftonbladet; she has also worked for the editorial firm Loweforever. In 2006, she led the fashion television show Sofies mode on Kanal 5 in Sweden, which was later also broadcast on TV7. In 2011, Sofi along with her sister Frida Fahrman hosted the television show Stylisterna (the stylists) on Kanal 5 Play.

During 2007, she also hosted her own travelling television show on TV7 called Sofi and the city, where she travelled to seven cities in the world. In the show she guided the viewers to places where she usually shops and frequents, such as night clubs and restaurants. The seven cities covered in the show were: New York City, Tokyo, London, Los Angeles, Copenhagen and Paris.

Fahrman has also published two books: Elsas mode was released in stores in 2009; Elsas värld came out in 2010. The books tell the story about a young fashion blogger who moves to Stockholm and becomes entangled in the high-life of Stureplan.

== Royal friendship ==
Fahrman's close friendship with the Swedish Princess Madeleine has been highly covered by Swedish media. It was even rumoured that the Princess and Fahrman were living together in Fahrman's apartment in New York City, something later denied by Fahrman's own fashion magazine Sofis mode.

== Personal life ==
Sofi Fahrman is the older sister of Frida Fahrman, who is also fashion editor and reporter. She is divorced from Dutch businessman Nick Zijlstra and they have a daughter named Lily, born on 18 May 2013.

== Bibliography ==
- Elsas mode (2009)
- Elsas värld (2010)
