= Halmstad Castle =

Coordinates: 56°40′18″N 12°51′28″E

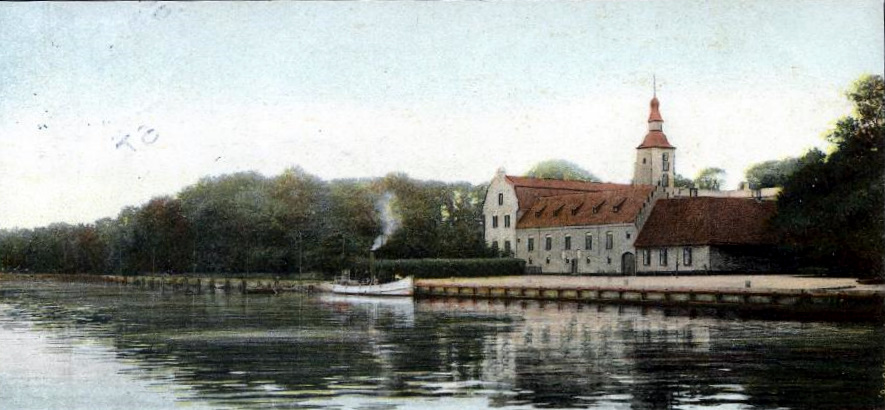
Halmstad Castle (1900)

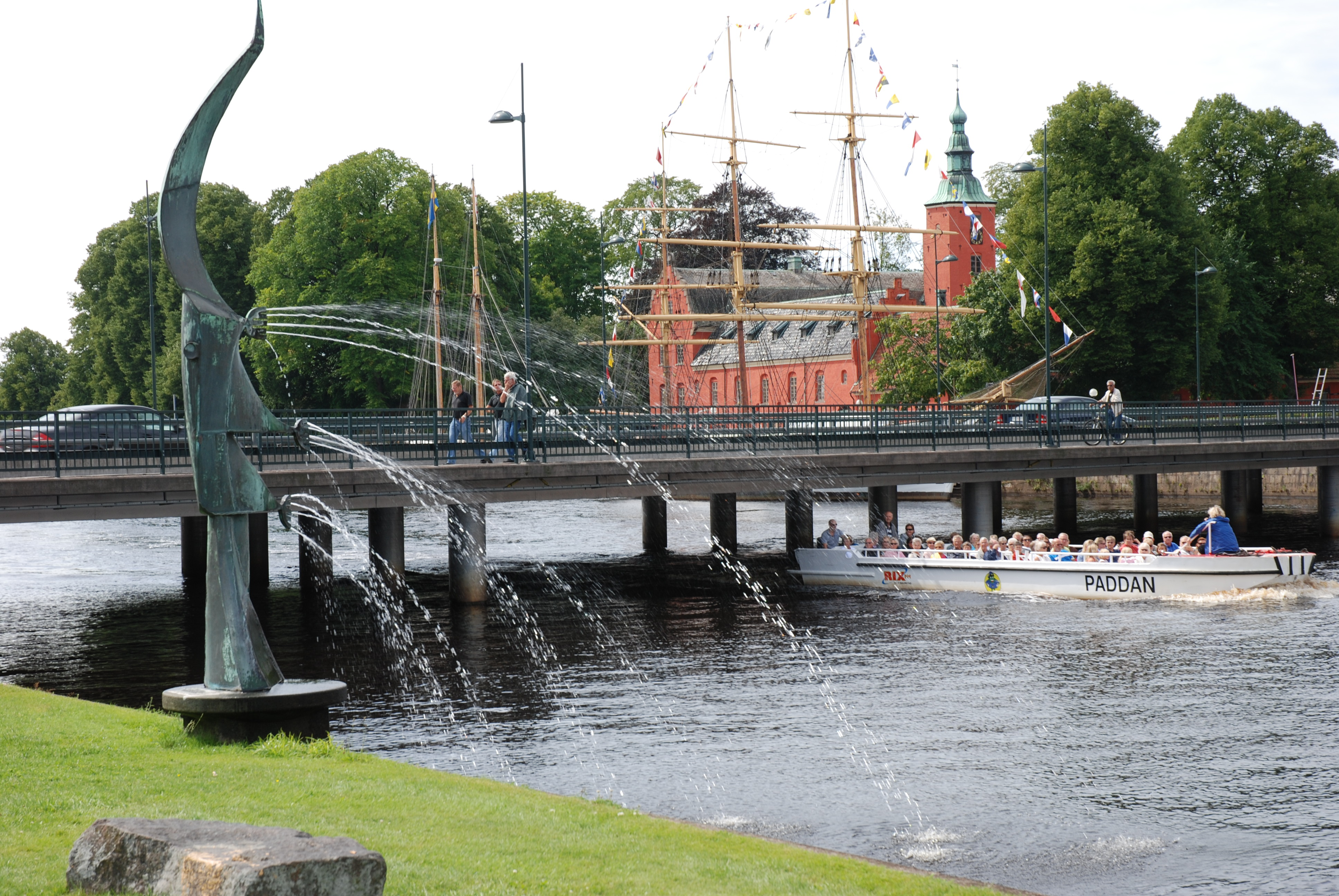
View of Halmstad Castle on the Nissan River with the sculpture The Salmons go uppstream by Walter Bengtsson

Halmstad Castle (Halmstads slott) is a 17th-century castle situated in Halmstad, in the province of Halland, Sweden.

During the first half of the 17th century, Halland was a province of Denmark. In 1595 the farm on the site where the castle now stands was purchased for use as a residence for the Danish Christian IV on his visit to Halmstad. It was under the authority of King Christian that the castle was constructed.

Construction on the castle and nine adjoining lots started in 1609. Construction was likely completed in 1615. Construction manager and architect was Dutch architect Willum Cornelissen. The architecture of the castle is typical for the period, in a style known as Christian IV Renaissance. It is more reminiscent of contemporary Danish country houses than an elegant royal palace.

With the Second Treaty of Brömsebro (1645), and finally the Treaty of Roskilde in 1658, the castle came under the authority of Bengt Christoffersson Lilliehook, the first Swedish governor of Halland. When Halland became a province of Sweden, Halmstad Castle become a residence of visiting Swedish kings. The Swedes reinforced the castle, and in 1658 an inner fortress was finished and the facade had been much smaller window.

From 1770 and until today, the castle has been restored several times. In modern times it has become the traditional residence of the governor of Halland County. The governor of the castle and the local authority have some of its offices here. In 1999 Music of Halland (Musik i Halland) moved in, and during 2000 Halmstad Tourist (Halmstads Turistbyrå) established its offices in the east wing.

== Pictures ==
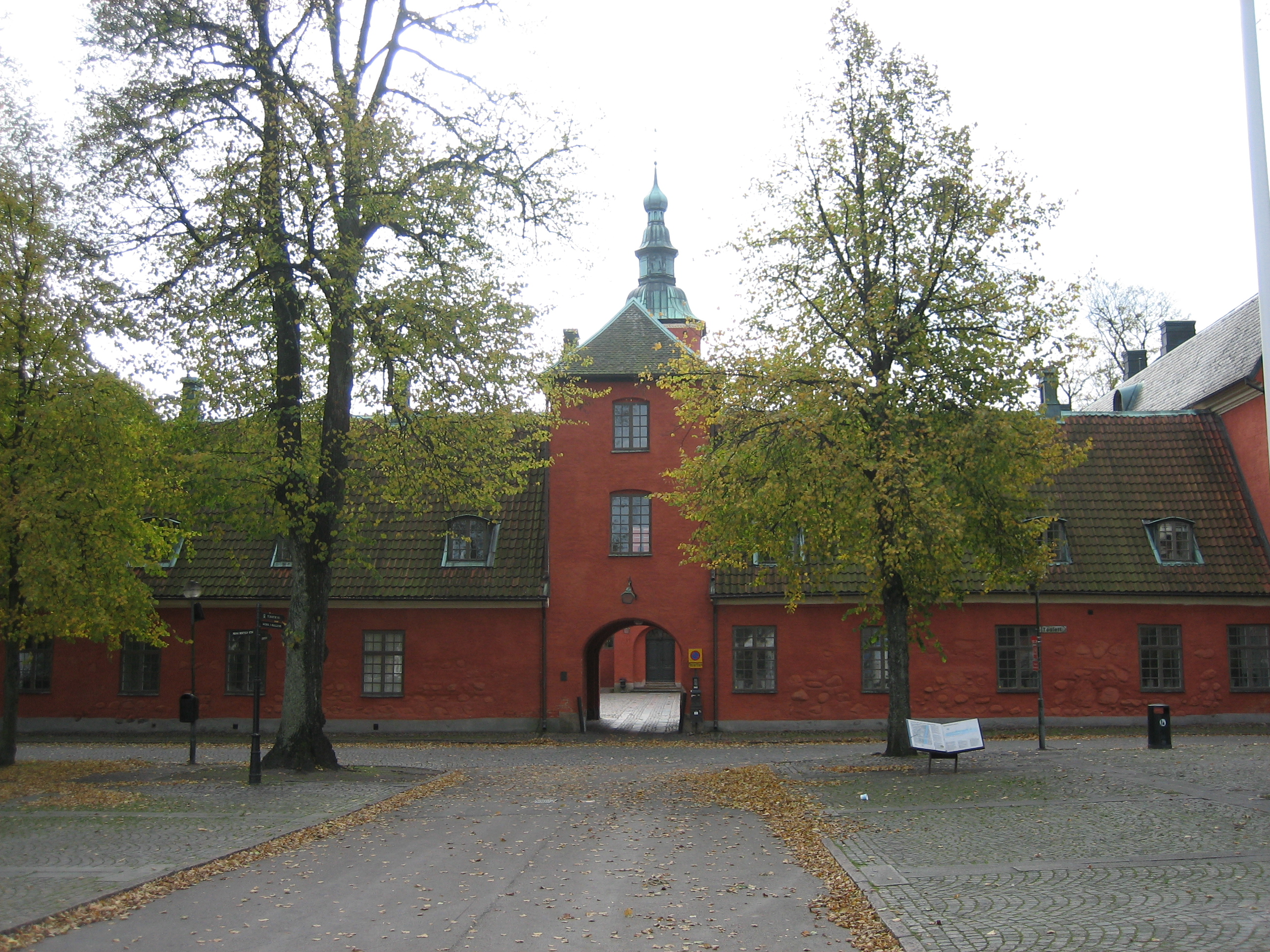

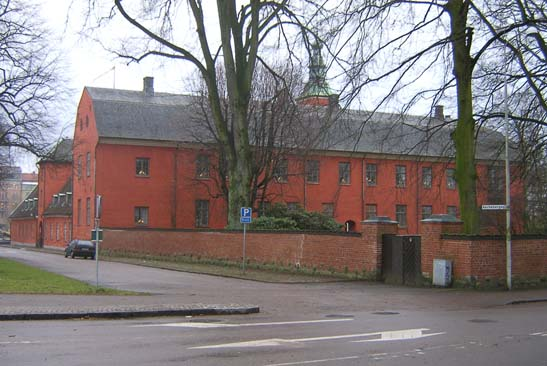

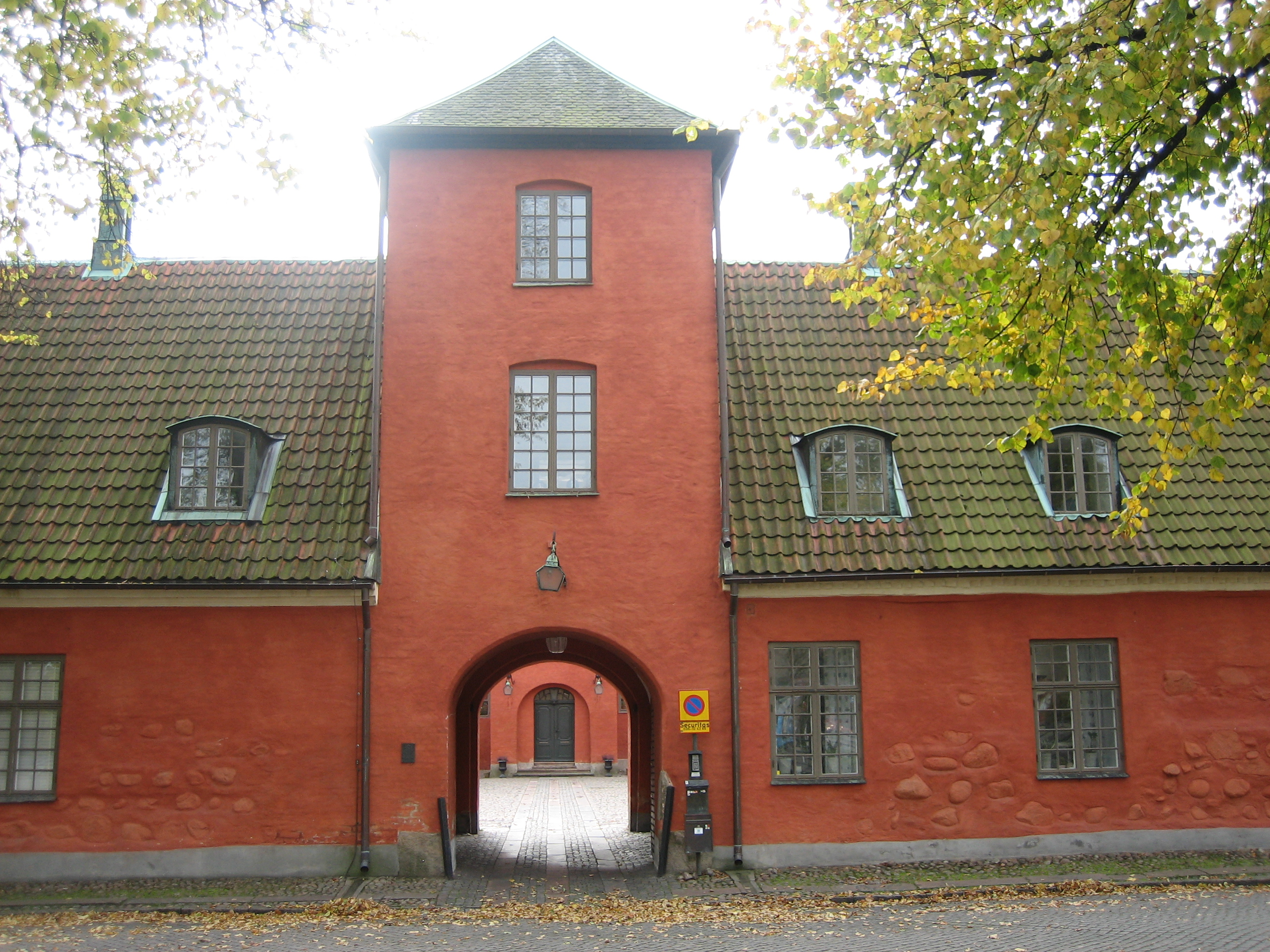

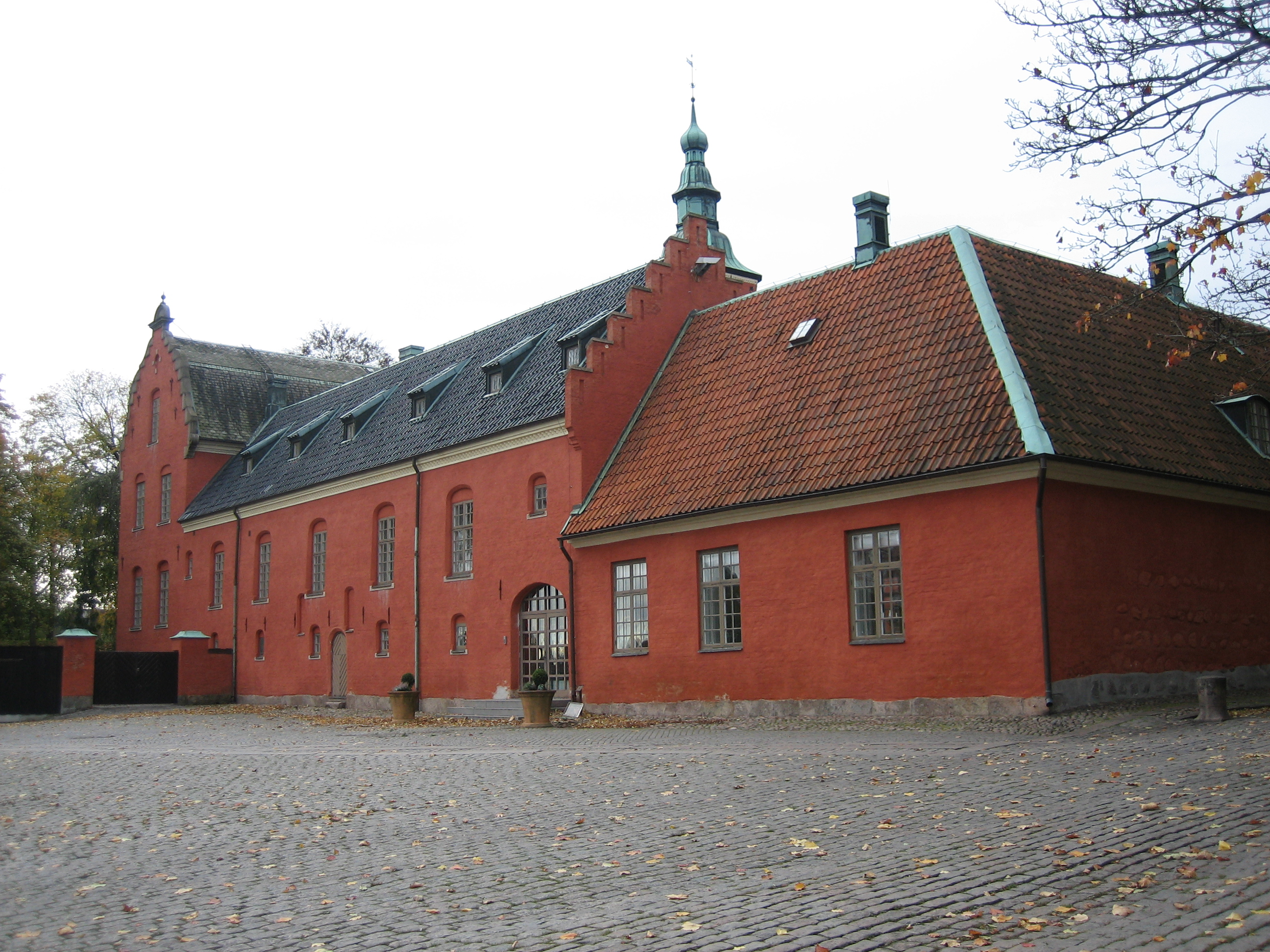
