= Dag Nätterqvist =

Swedish equestrian

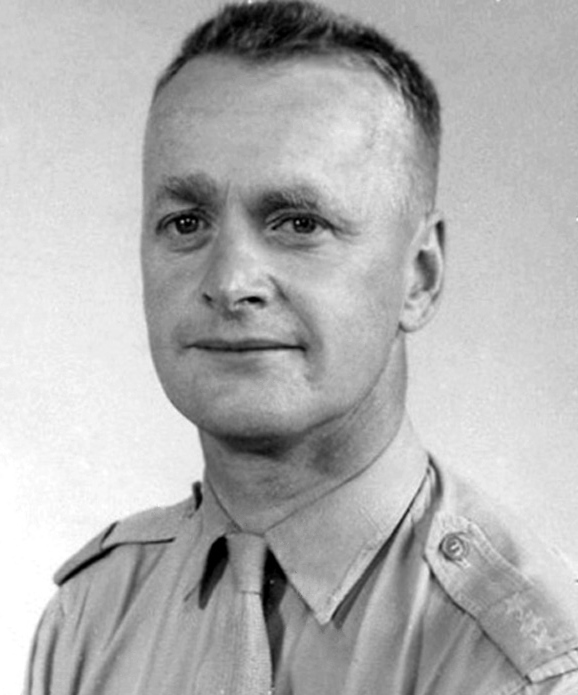

Personal information
- Born: 20 June 1922 Stockholm, Sweden
- Died: 20 November 2009 (aged 87) Färjestaden, Sweden
- Height: 175 cm (5 ft 9 in)
- Weight: 69 kg (152 lb)

Sport
- Sport: Horse riding
- Club: Strömsholms Skytteförening

Dag Nätterqvist (20 June 1922 – 20 November 2009) was a Swedish equestrian.

== Career ==
He competed in jumping (horse) at the 1960 Summer Olympics, but failed to win a medal.

== Personal life ==
His son Ted and his wife Pia Levin Nätterqvist were also competitive equestrian jumpers. His grandson Joakim is a Swedish actor, theatre director, singer and songwriter and acting coach.
