= Oleg of Dereva =

Oleg Sviatoslavich
- Prince of the Drevlians
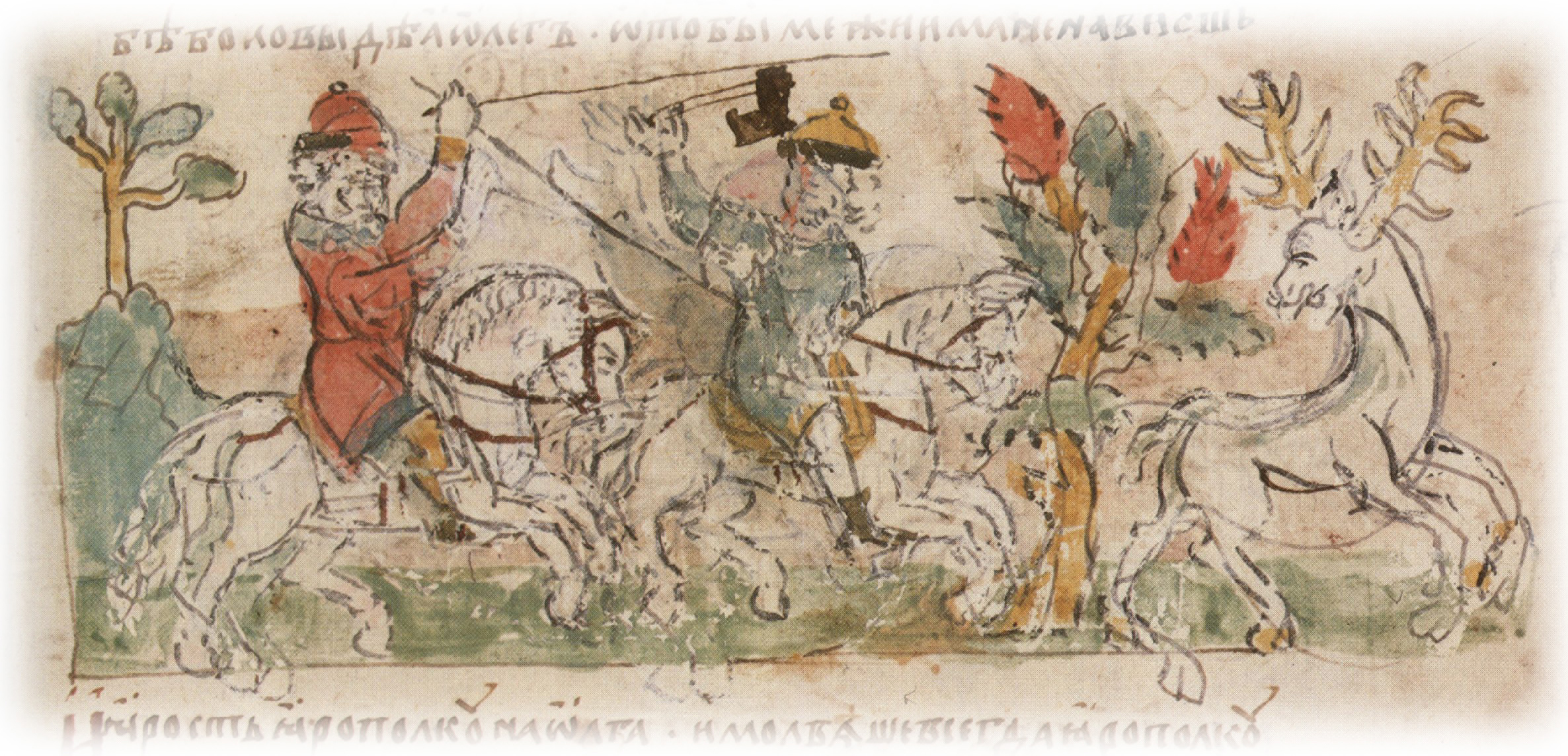
- The murder of Lyut Sveneldich, son of the Kiev voivode Sveneld, by Oleg. Miniature from the Radziwiłł Chronicle (15th century)
- Reign: 970–977
- Died: 977; Ovruch
- Burial: Church of the Tithes
- House: Rurik
- Father: Sviatoslav I of Kiev

Oleg Sviatoslavich (Олег Святославич; died 977) was the prince of the Drevlians from 970 until his death in 977. He was the second son of Sviatoslav I of Kiev of the Rurik dynasty.

== Biography ==
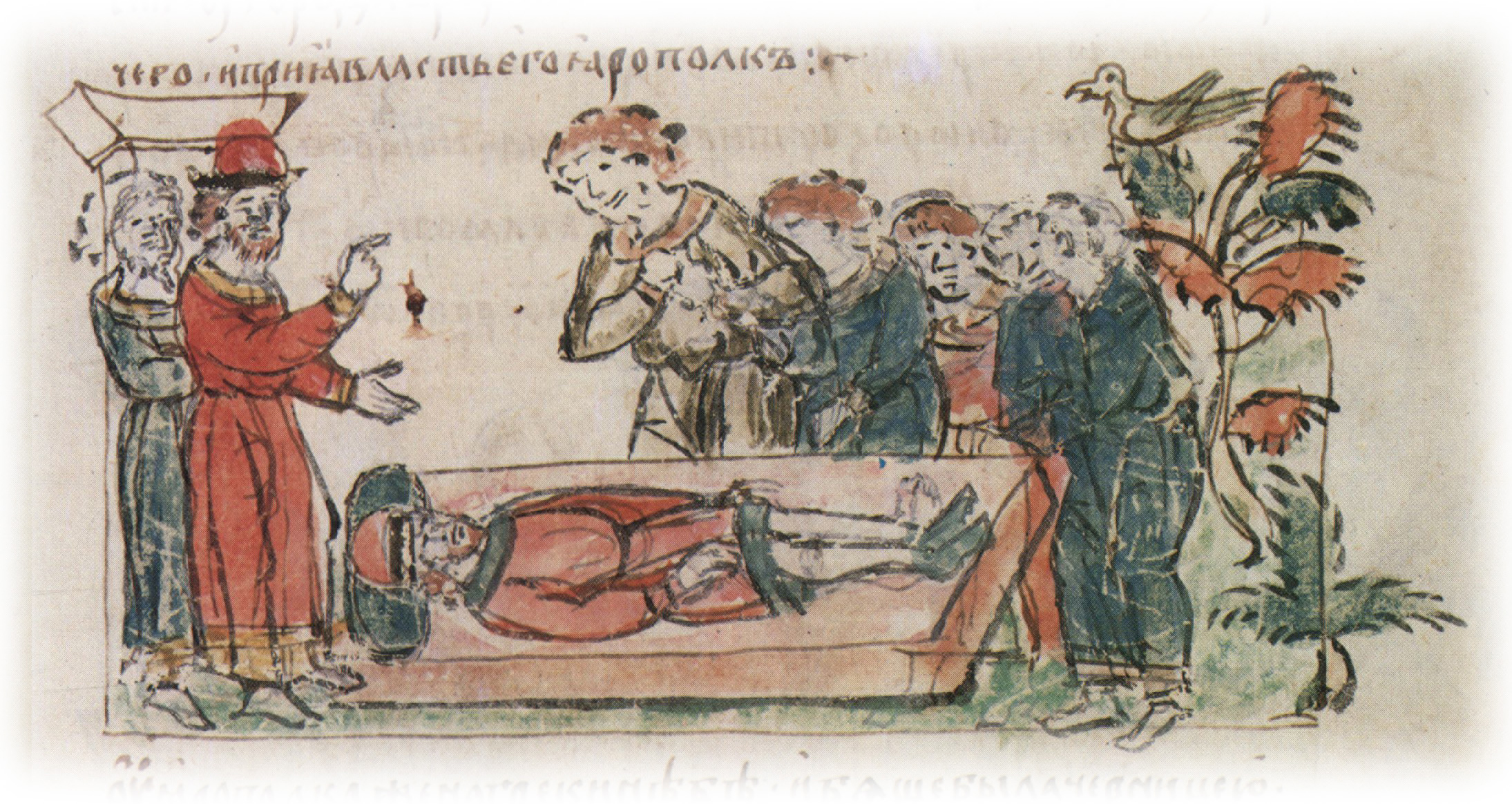
Death of Oleg in Ovruch

Oleg's date of birth is not known, but it is probably before 957. Sviatoslav split up his domains, and gave the Drevlian lands to Oleg in 970. Oleg and his brother Yaropolk went to war after their father's death. According to the Primary Chronicle, Oleg killed Lyut, the son of Yaropolk's chief adviser and military commander Sveneld, when he hunted in the Drevlian lands which Oleg regarded as his own. In an act of revenge and at the insistence of Sveneld, Yaropolk went to war against his brother Oleg and killed him in Ovruch. Oleg was killed incidentally on the run in a moat, and Yaropolk did regret this. Then, Yaropolk sent his men to Novgorod, from which his other brother Vladimir had fled on receiving the news about Oleg's death. Yaropolk became the sole ruler of Kievan Rus'.

In 1044, Yaroslav I the Wise had Oleg's bones exhumed, christened, and reburied in the Church of the Tithes.

== Possible descendants ==
There is a Czech legend (mentioned by Jan Amos Komenský (in Spis o rodu Žerotínů), Bartosz Paprocki and Bohuslav Balbín, among others), that the noble House of Zierotin descends from Oleg (see ru:Олег Моравский for details).

Oleg of Drelinia Rurikovich Born: ? Died: 977
Regnal titles
Preceded by ?	Prince of the Drevlians; 969–977	Succeeded by ?
Titles in pretence
Preceded by Yaropolk I	Prince of Kiev; 975–977	Succeeded by Vladimir the Great
