= Steve Ralphs =

British bowyer

Stephen Ralphs, or 'the bow and arrow man', is a traditional bowyer and film armorer. Born January 1955 in Plymouth, England and currently residing in Norfolk, England.

Steve is a full-time traditional bowyer and Grand Master of the Traditional Bowyers Guild: a closed society of Master craftsmen. He has manufactured archery equipment for such blockbusting cinematography as Gladiator, Kingdom of Heaven, The 13th Warrior, Eragon, King Arthur, Arn – The Knight Templar and many other productions. He trains actors, stuntmen and extras for their demanding roles in front of the camera and behind.

Also an actor, he can also be found playing two roles in Ridley Scotts' Gladiator. He is both the Fire Archer and the captain of the Felix Archers who calls the orders out before the archery volley.

His work has taken him all over the World to countries as far a field as Sweden, Morocco and Hungary. Steve is the last Ralphs Bowyer in a line that stretches back to medieval England and the 15th century when his ancestors lived in the village of Marton in Shropshire, England.
