= Yaropolk I of Kiev =

Prince of Kiev from 972 to 978

Yaropolk I
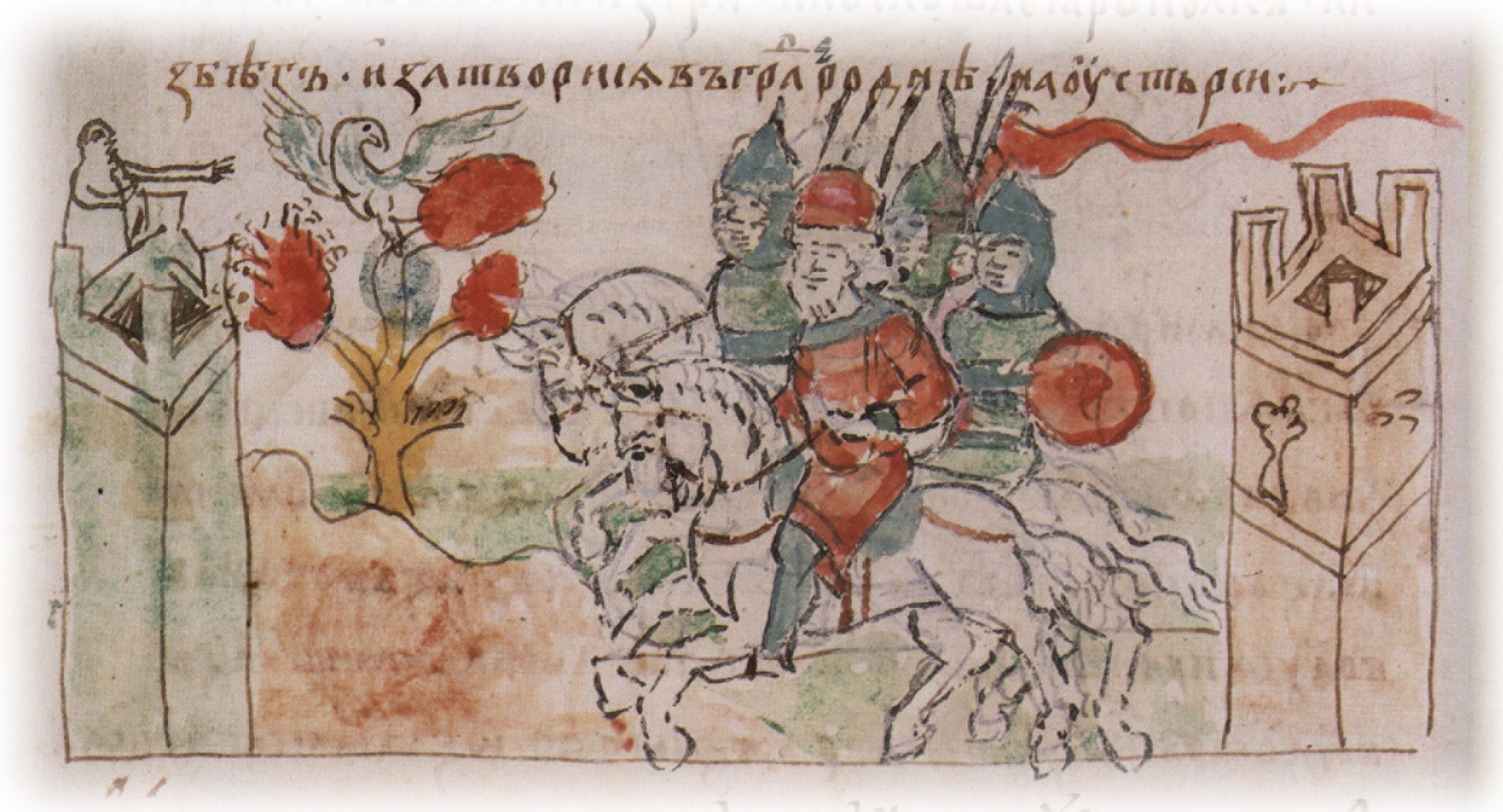
- Late 15th century depiction from the Radziwiłł Chronicle. Yaropolk is shown at the head of his cavalry

Prince of Kyiv
- Reign: 972–978
- Predecessor: Sviatoslav I
- Successor: Vladimir I
- Born: c. 958
- Died: 11 June 978; Kanev
- Burial: Church of the Tithes, Kyiv
- Spouse: Greek nun
- Issue: possibly Sviatopolk the Accursed
Names
- Yaropolk Sviatoslavovich
- Dynasty: Rurik
- Father: Sviatoslav I
- Mother: Malusha

Yaropolk I Sviatoslavich (also translitered as Iaropolk Svyatoslavich; Old East Slavic: Ꙗрополкъ Свѧтославичъ; (Note: Russian: Ярополк Святославич; Ukrainian: Ярополк Святославич, romanized: Yaropolk Sviatoslavych) 958 – 11 June 978) was Prince of Kyiv from 972 to 978. He was the oldest son of Sviatoslav I. Some modern sources suggest that his mother was Malusha, who was a steward in the household of his grandmother, Olga of Kyiv. However, primary chronicles such as the Primary Chronicle do not name his mother, and this identification remains unconfirmed by early sources.

== Life ==
Yaropolk was given Kiev by his father Sviatoslav I, who left on a military campaign against the Danube Bulgars. Soon after Sviatoslav's death, however, civil war began between Yaropolk and his brothers. According to one chronicle, Yaropolk's brother Oleg killed Lyut, the son of Yaropolk's chief adviser and military commander Sveneld. Alternatively, Sveneld is identical to Sviatoslav, as Sveinald/Sveneld is the Norse rendition of the Slavic name. In an act of revenge and at Sveneld's insistence, Yaropolk went to war against his brother and killed him. Yaropolk then sent his men to Novgorod, from which his other brother Vladimir had fled upon receiving news of Oleg's death. Yaropolk became the sole ruler of Rus'.

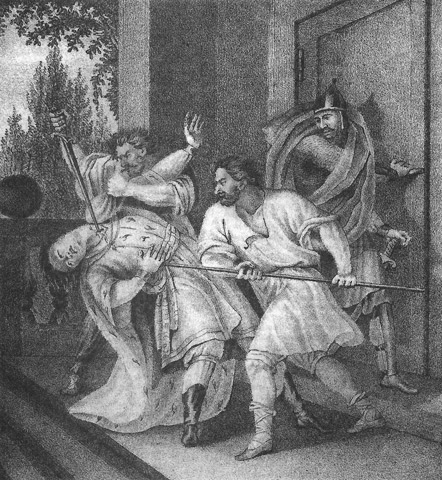
Murder of Yaropolk

In 978, Vladimir returned with the Varangian mercenaries and attacked Yaropolk. On his way to Kiev, Vladimir seized Polotsk because Rogneda, daughter of the Polotsk prince Rogvolod, had chosen Yaropolk over him. Vladimir forced Rogneda to marry him. Then, Vladimir seized Kiev with assistance from a boyar, Blud, who had become Yaropolk's chief adviser upon the death of Sveneld. Blud betrayed Yaropolk by advising him to flee from Kiev to the town of Rodnya at the mouth of the Ros' River. Vladimir besieged Rodnya and starved Yaropolk into negotiations. Yaropolk trusted Blud's and his brother's promises of peace and left for Vladimir's headquarters, where he was killed in an ambush by two Varangians.

== Purported baptism ==
As for contemporary foreign sources, Lambert of Hersfeld records that, on the Easter of 973, the Holy Roman Emperor was visited by envoys from Rus' (legati gentium Ruscorum). In later centuries it was said that Yaropolk also exchanged ambassadors with the Pope. The Chronicon of Adémar de Chabannes and the life of St. Romuald (by Pietro Damiani) document how St. Bruno of Querfurt was sent to Rus' (Latin: Russia) and succeeded in converting a local king (one of three brothers who ruled the land) to Christianity. As both texts are rife with anachronisms, Vladimir Parkhomenko reasons that Bruno's deeds were conflated with those of his predecessors, Adalbert of Prague and several anonymous missionaries active in Eastern Europe during Otto II's reign.

Following this line of thought, Alexander Nazarenko suggests that Yaropolk went through some preliminary rites of baptism, but was murdered by his pagan half-brother (whose own rights to the throne were questionable) before he could be formally received in the Christian faith. Any information on Yaropolk's baptism according to the Latin rite would be suppressed by later Orthodox chroniclers, zealous to keep Vladimir's image of the Russian Apostle untarnished for succeeding generations. It is known that Vladimir's son Yaroslav had Yaropolk's bones exhumed, christened and interred in the Church of the Tithes.

== Marriage and issue ==
It is known that Yaropolk was married to a Greek nun. She gave birth to one son of disputed paternity:

- Sviatopolk I of Kiev (c. 980 – 1019)

== Notes ==
Yaropolk I of Kiev Rurikovich Born: c. 958–960 Died: 11 June 980
Regnal titles
Preceded by Sviatoslav I Igorevich	Prince of Kiev; 972–980	Succeeded by Vladimir I Sviatoslavich
Titles in pretence
Preceded by Sviatoslav the Brave	Prince of Kiev; 970?–972	Succeeded by Oleg of the Drevlyans
