= Otto Ralfs =

Classical modern art collector

- Born: 1892; Gifhorn, Braunschweig
- Occupation: Art

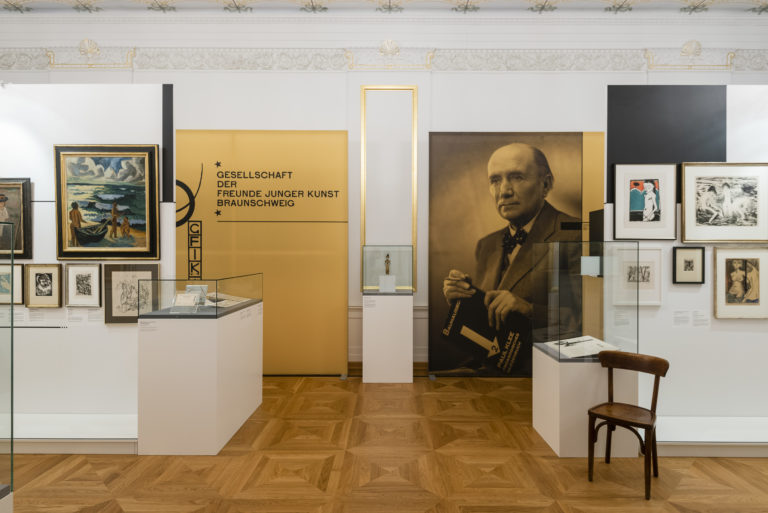
In the background on the right: Portrait of Otto Ralf by Heinrich Heidersberger, around 1950

Otto Ralfs (April 1, 1892, in Braunschweig – December 13, 1955, in Gifhorn) was a collector of classical modern art in Braunschweig.

== Early life ==
Otto Ralfs was the son of the Braunschweig ironmonger Adolf Ralfs (died January 1945 in Braunschweig). He attended the Real-Gymnasium in Braunschweig and the Wolterstorffsche Institut in Ballenstedt, after which he completed a commercial apprenticeship in Hanover. He initially worked in his father's business and later as branch manager of an iron wholesaler in Hamburg.

During the First World War, Ralf was a vice sergeant and reserve officer aspirant. After the end of the war, he married Käte Brachvogel, a friend of his sister, in 1919. On August 20, 1920, Ralfs founded the Braunschweig Canoe Club.

== Art Collecting ==
In 1923, he discovered his penchant for modern art while attending the Bauhaus in Weimar. In the same year, Ralfs held his first exhibition of "modern art" paintings at the then Landesmuseum (now the Herzog Anton Ulrich Museum). He became friends with artists such as Klee, Kandinsky, Feininger, Jawlensky and Maatsch and regularly invited them to Brunswick. These visits resulted in his "famous guest book with artistic entries by important painters", which is now part of the Städtisches Museum's collection.

In September 1924, Ralfs founded the Society of Friends of Young Art (Gesellschaft der Freunde junger Kunst - GFJK) and became its first chairman. The first exhibition took place in the Landesmuseum on November 16, 1924, and from March 1925 the society had a permanent exhibition space in Braunschweig Castle.

In 1925, Ralfs founded the Klee Society, which set itself the goal of supporting the painter Paul Klee financially by purchasing his works. It enabled the painter to make his second trip to the Orient in 1928-1929 to Egypt.

One of the Klees he owned, Feuer Clown I (Fire Clown), 1921, is now in the National Gallery of Art in Washington, D.C. while three (Mural from the Templ of Longing Hither, A Pride of Lions: Take Note and Boy in a Fancy Dress are in the Metropolitan Museum of Art in New York.

He also owned Klee's Zwillinge (Twins)

Ralfs exhibited pieces from his collection in public exhibitions in 1930.

== Nazi era difficulties ==
After Adolf Hitler came to power in 1933, the Society of Friends of Young Art (GFJK) was forced by Nazi pressure to dissolve. Exhibition activities had to be discontinued due to the accusation of "degenerate art".

== Postwar ==
After the Second World War, Ralfs founded the Otto Ralfs Gallery and continued to exhibit modern art from June 28, 1947, until his death.

The donation to the HAUM by the Braunschweig Society of Friends of Young Art, dissolved under the Nazis by the art collectors Otto Ralfs and Erich Scheyer (a brother of the art dealer Galka Scheyer), is undergoing research to resolve questions due to the unresolved ownership and provenance.

== Theft and recovery of the Ralfs' Kandinsky ==
A Kandinky that once belonged to Ralfs was stolen twice and the subject of an investigative report by the Financial Times. In December 1984, Sotheby's published a provenance riddled with errors. According to the Financial Times the catalogue from the auction:

misspells "Otto Ralff" as a previous owner. It locates him incorrectly in Munich. And it omits any mention of the National Museum of Warsaw or the presence of the museum's stamp, which was on the back of the artwork. Missing, too, is any mention of the seller, as though the artwork had come through some direct channel from Ralfs.

The German Lost Art Foundation lists 85 art objects that once belonged to Ralf, such as this Klee in the collection of the K20 - Kunstsammlung Nordrhein-Westfalen.

Archives in the Harvard library.

== Family ==
Otto Ralfs was married to Käte Ralfs, née Brachvogel (July 8, 1898, in Braunschweig – January 15, 1995, in Braunschweig). After Otto Ralfs died in an accident in 1955, his wife survived him by almost 40 years – in 1991, she was awarded the City of Braunschweig's Citizens' Medal for the couple's special services to the "promotion of fine art" and a play was written about the family's history.

== Literature ==
- Peter Lufft, Jutta Brüdern: Käte Ralfs In: Peter Lufft (ed.): Profile aus Braunschweig. Persönliches über Persönlichkeiten in Bild und Text, 1st edition. Appelhans Verlag, Salzgitter 1996, ISBN 3930292033, p. 72 [unpaginated].
- Luitgard Camerer, Manfred Garzmann, Wolf-Dieter Schuegraf (commissioned by the city of Braunschweig): Braunschweiger Stadtlexikon, 4th edition. Meyer, Braunschweig 1996, ISBN 3926701145, p. 187.
- Manfred Garzmann, Wolf-Dieter Schuegraf (commissioned by the city of Braunschweig): Braunschweiger Stadtlexikon – Ergänzungsband, 2nd edition. Meyer, Braunschweig 1997, ISBN 3926701307, p. 108.
- Richard Moderhack: Braunschweiger Stadtgeschichte. Braunschweig 1997, ISBN 3878840500, p. 198.

== See also ==
- Werner Otto (entrepreneur)
- International Foundation for Art Research
- Galerie Nierendorf
