= Alexey Karpov =

Russian historian, social scientist, and culturologist

Alexey Yuryevich Karpov
- Alexey Karpov
- Born: 5 May 1960 (age 66); Moscow, USSR
- Education: Moscow State Pedagogical University
- Known for: Historian, Culturologist
- Scientific career
- Fields: History
- Doctoral advisor: Apollo Kuzmin

Alexey Yuryevich Karpov (Russian: Алексе́й Юрьевич Кáрпов) is a Russian historian, obshestvoved and culturologist. The editor of the publishing house Molodaya Gvardiya. He is a specialist in the history of ancient Russia.

He was awarded many scientific prizes, including the National award "Imperial culture" named after Eduard Volodin and The Patriarchal literary award.

== Life ==
Karpov was born on May 5, 1960, in Moscow.

In 1982, he graduated from the history Department of the Moscow State Pedagogical University. For about 5 years, he worked as a high school history and obshestvovedeny teacher.

In 1987, he got a job as an editor at the Molodaya Gvardiya publishing house. It has been published since 1990.

During his life, Karpov wrote more than 100 historical works; biographies of the rulers of Kievan Rus' became very popular. He became famous for historical biographies of the rulers of ancient Ukraine, primarily the "Orthodox trilogy", which includes books about Princess Olga, Yaroslav the Wise and Vladimir the Great.

Currently lives and works in Moscow.

== Honours ==
- «Alexander Nevsky» (2005) — for the book «Grand Duke Alexander Nevsky»
- National award «Imperial culture» named after Eduard Volodin (2014) — for the book «Grand Duke Alexander Nevsky»
- Winner of the IX competition «Education through the book» (2014) — First degree diploma in the category «The best spiritual and Patriotic book» for the book «Andrey Bogolyubsky»
- The Patriarchal literary award (2016) — «for significant contribution to the development of Russian literature»

== Main works ==
- 2002 – Grand Duke Alexander Nevsky
- 2004 – Vladimir the Great
- 2005 – Yaroslav the Wise
- 2007 – Yuri Dolgoruky
- 2009 – Princess Olga
- 2011 – Baty
- 2013 – Orthodox saints and miracle workers
- 2014 – Andrey Bogolyubsky
- 2015 – Grand Duke Vladimir Monomakh
- 2019 – Vsevolod the big nest

In addition, Karpov is the author of historical books for children, articles on the study of ancient Ukraine and historical research.
