= Moral Knowledge =

- Author: Sarah McGrath
- Language: English
- Subject: moral epistemology
- Publisher: Oxford University Press
- Publication date: 2019
- Media type: hardcover, ebook
- Pages: 240
- ISBN: 9780198805410

Moral Knowledge is a 2019 book by Sarah McGrath in which the author discusses possibilities, sources, and vulnerabilities of moral knowledge.

== Synopsis ==
Sarah McGrath deals with different topics on the basis of the «working hypothesis» that she states in the opening chapter, according to which moral knowledge can be acquired and lost in any of the ways in which we acquire and lose ordinary empirical knowledge. The hypothesis consists of two parts: (1) any source of empirical knowledge is also a potential source of moral knowledge; (2) our efforts to acquire and preserve moral knowledge are subject to frustration in all of the same ways that our efforts to acquire and preserve ordinary empirical knowledge are. Chapters 2, 3, and 4 are devoted to defending the first part of the working hypothesis, whereas the second part is defended in Chapter 5; the concluding chapter contains a summary of the theses argued for by McGrath.

== Reception ==
The book was reviewed in the European Journal of Philosophy (by Hallvard Lillehammer), Notre Dame Philosophical Reviews (by David Phillips), Philosophy in Review (by Eric Wilkinson) and Philosophical Inquiries (by Luciana Ceri).
