= Social science =

Branch of science that studies society and its relationships

Social science (or the social sciences) is one of the branches of science, devoted to the study of societies and the relationships among members within those societies. The term was formerly used to refer to the field of sociology, the original "science of society", established in the 18th century. It now encompasses a wide array of additional academic disciplines, including anthropology, archaeology, economics, geography, history, linguistics, management, communication studies, psychology, sociology, culturology, and political science.

The majority of positivist social scientists use methods resembling those used in the natural sciences as tools for understanding societies, and so define science in its stricter modern sense. Speculative social scientists, otherwise known as interpretivist scientists, by contrast, may use social critique or symbolic interpretation rather than constructing empirically falsifiable theories, and thus treat science in its broader sense. In modern academic practice, researchers are often eclectic, using multiple methodologies (combining both quantitative and qualitative research). To gain a deeper understanding of complex human behavior in digital environments, social science disciplines have increasingly integrated interdisciplinary approaches, big data, and computational tools. The term social research has also acquired a degree of autonomy as practitioners from various disciplines share similar goals and methods.

== History ==
The history of the social sciences began in the Age of Enlightenment after 1651, which saw a revolution within natural philosophy, changing the basic framework by which individuals understood what was scientific. Social sciences came forth from the moral philosophy of the time and were influenced by the Age of Revolutions, such as the Industrial Revolution and the French Revolution. The social sciences developed from the sciences (experimental and applied), or the systematic knowledge-bases or prescriptive practices, relating to the social improvement of a group of interacting entities.

The beginnings of the social sciences in the 18th century are reflected in the grand encyclopedia of Diderot, with articles from Jean-Jacques Rousseau and other pioneers. The growth of the social sciences is also reflected in other specialized encyclopedias. The term "social science" was coined in French by Mirabeau in 1767, before becoming a distinct conceptual field in the nineteenth century. Social science was influenced by positivism, focusing on knowledge based on actual positive sense experience and avoiding the negative; metaphysical speculation was avoided. Auguste Comte used the term science sociale to describe the field, taken from the ideas of Charles Fourier; Comte also referred to the field as social physics. According to Comte, the social physics field was similar to that of natural sciences.

Following this period, five paths of development sprang forth in the social sciences, influenced by Comte in other fields. One route that was taken was the rise of social research. Large statistical surveys were undertaken in various parts of the United States and Europe. Another route undertaken was initiated by Émile Durkheim, studying "social facts", and Vilfredo Pareto, opening metatheoretical ideas and individual theories. A third means developed, arising from the methodological dichotomy present, in which social phenomena were identified with and understood; this was championed by figures such as Max Weber. The fourth route taken, based in economics, was developed and furthered economic knowledge as a hard science. The last path was the correlation of knowledge and social values; the antipositivism and verstehen sociology of Max Weber firmly demanded this distinction. In this route, theory (description) and prescription were non-overlapping formal discussions of a subject.

The foundation of social sciences in the West implies conditioned relationships between progressive and traditional spheres of knowledge. In some contexts, such as the Italian one, sociology slowly affirms itself and experiences the difficulty of affirming a strategic knowledge beyond philosophy and theology.

Around the start of the 20th century, Enlightenment philosophy was challenged in various quarters. After the use of classical theories since the end of the scientific revolution, various fields substituted mathematics studies for experimental studies and examining equations to build a theoretical structure. The development of social science subfields became very quantitative in methodology. The interdisciplinary and cross-disciplinary nature of scientific inquiry into human behaviour, social and environmental factors affecting it, made many of the natural sciences interested in some aspects of social science methodology. Examples of boundary blurring include emerging disciplines like social research of medicine, sociobiology, neuropsychology, bioeconomics and the history and sociology of science. Increasingly, quantitative research and qualitative methods are being integrated in the study of human action and its implications and consequences. In the first half of the 20th century, statistics became a free-standing discipline of applied mathematics. Statistical methods were used confidently.

In the contemporary period, Karl Popper and Talcott Parsons influenced the furtherance of the social sciences. Researchers continue to search for a unified consensus on what methodology might have the power and refinement to connect a proposed "grand theory" with the various midrange theories that, with considerable success, continue to provide usable frameworks for massive, growing data banks; for more, see consilience. The social sciences will for the foreseeable future be composed of different zones in the research of, and sometimes distinct in approach toward, the field.

The term "social science" may refer either to the specific sciences of society established by thinkers such as Comte, Durkheim, Marx, and Weber, or more generally to all disciplines outside of "noble science" and arts. By the late 19th century, the academic social sciences were constituted of five fields: jurisprudence and amendment of the law, education, health, economy and trade, and art.

Around the start of the 21st century, the expanding domain of economics in the social sciences has been described as economic imperialism.

A distinction is usually drawn between the social sciences and the humanities. Classicist Allan Bloom writes in The Closing of the American Mind (1987):

Social science and humanities have a mutual contempt for one another, the former looking down on the latter as unscientific, the latter regarding the former as philistine. [...] The difference comes down to the fact that social science really wants to be predictive, meaning that man is predictable, while the humanities say that he is not.

== Branches ==
The social science disciplines are branches of knowledge taught and researched at the college or university level. Social science disciplines are defined and recognized by the academic journals in which research is published, and the learned social science societies and academic departments or faculties to which their practitioners belong. Social science fields of study usually have several sub-disciplines or branches, and the distinguishing lines between these are often both arbitrary and ambiguous. The following are widely-considered to be social sciences:

- Accounting
- Anthropology
- Archaeology
- Archival science
- Area studies
- Behavioural science
- Business administration
- Business studies
- Cartography
- Cognitive science
- Commerce
- Communication studies
- Crime science
- Criminology
- Cultural studies
- Culturology
- Demography
- Development studies
- Discourse analysis
- Economics
- Education
- Education science
- Environmental science
- Environmental social science
- Environmental studies
- Ethnography
- Ethnology
- Finance
- Folklore studies
- Futures studies
- Gender studies
- Geography
- Global studies
- History
- Home economics
- Human resource management
- Industrial relations
- Information sciences
- International relations
- Journalism
- Landscape ecology
- Law
- Legal management
- Library science
- Linguistics
- Management
- Management science
- Marketing
- Media studies
- Military science
- Organizational behavior
- Organizational studies
- Paralegal studies
- Philology
- Philosophy
- Political science
- Public administration
- Public health
- Public policy
- Public relations
- Psychology
- Religious studies
- Social welfare
- Social work
- Sociology
- Strategic studies
- Strategic management
- Sustainable development
- Sustainability studies
- Theology

=== Anthropology ===
The anthropological social sciences often develop nuanced descriptions rather than the general laws derived in physics or chemistry, or they may explain individual cases through more general principles, as in many fields of psychology. Within the United States, anthropology is divided into four sub-fields: archaeology, physical or biological anthropology, anthropological linguistics, and cultural anthropology. It is an area that is offered at most undergraduate institutions. The word anthropos (ἄνθρωπος) in Ancient Greek means "human being" or "person". Eric Wolf described sociocultural anthropology as "the most scientific of the humanities, and the most humanistic of the sciences".

The goal of anthropology is to provide a holistic account of humans and human nature in that anthropologists aim to consider the biological, linguistic, historic and cultural aspects of any problem. Since anthropology arose as a science in Western societies that were complex and industrial, a major trend within anthropology has been a methodological drive to study peoples in societies with more simple social organization, sometimes called "primitive" in anthropological literature. Today, anthropologists use terms such as "less complex" societies or refer to specific modes of subsistence or production, such as "pastoralist" or "forager" or "horticulturalist" to refer to humans living in non-industrial, non-Western cultures, such people or folk (ethnos) remaining of great interest within anthropology.

The quest for holism leads most anthropologists to study a people using biogenetic, archaeological, and linguistic data alongside direct observation of contemporary customs. In the 1990s and 2000s, calls for clarification of what constitutes a culture, of how an observer knows where his or her own culture ends and another begins, and other crucial topics in writing anthropology were heard. It is possible to view all human cultures as part of one large, evolving global culture. These dynamic relationships, between what can be observed on the ground, as opposed to what can be observed by compiling many local observations remain fundamental in any kind of anthropology, whether cultural, biological, linguistic or archaeological.

=== Communication studies ===
Communication studies deals with processes of human communication, commonly defined as the sharing of symbols to create meaning. The discipline encompasses a range of topics, from face-to-face conversation to mass media outlets such as television broadcasting. Communication studies also examine how messages are interpreted through the political, cultural, economic, and social dimensions of their contexts. Communication is institutionalized under many different names at different universities, including communication, communication studies, speech communication, rhetorical studies, communication science, media studies, communication arts, mass communication, media ecology, and communication and media science.

=== Economics ===
Economics is a social science that seeks to analyze and describe the production, distribution, and consumption of wealth. The word "economics" is from the Ancient Greek οἶκος (oikos, "family, household, estate") and νόμος (nomos, "custom, law"), and hence means "household management" or "management of the state". An economist is a person using economic concepts and data in the course of employment, or someone who has earned a degree in the subject. The classic brief definition of economics, set out by Lionel Robbins in 1932, is "the science which studies human behavior as a relationship between ends and scarce means which have alternative uses". Without scarcity and alternative uses, there is no economic problem. Briefer yet is "the study of how people seek to satisfy needs and wants" and "the study of the financial aspects of human behavior".

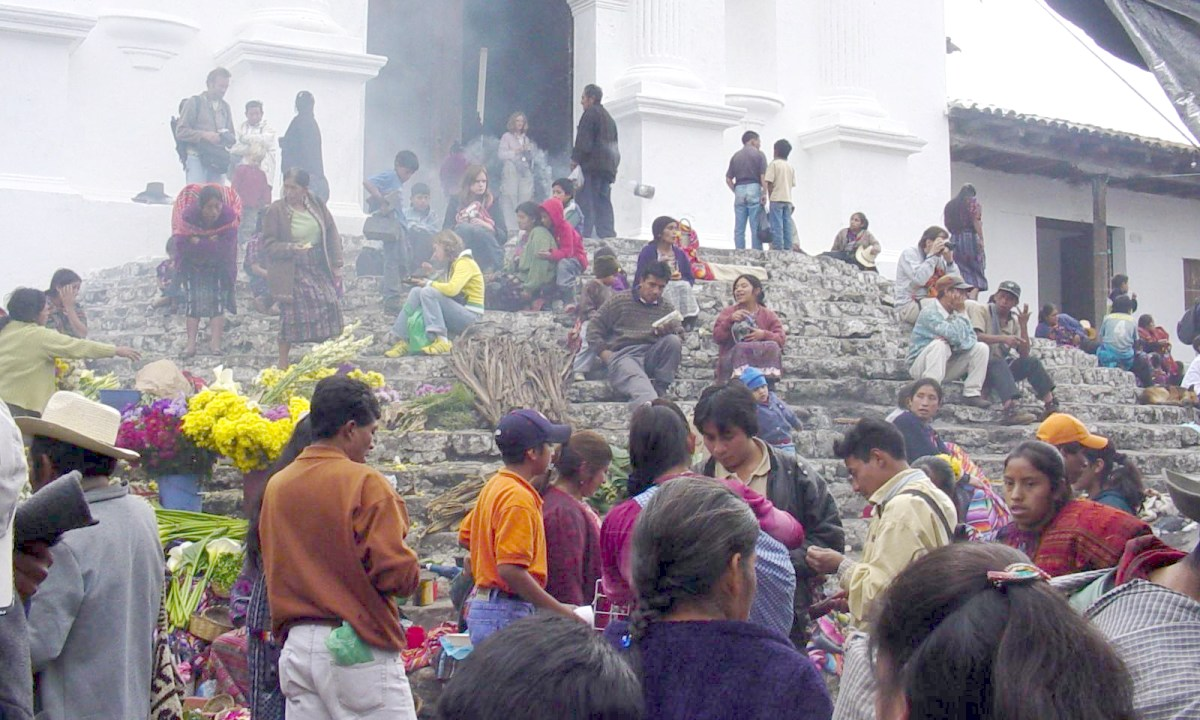
Buyers bargain for good prices while sellers put forth their best front in Chichicastenango Market, Guatemala.

Economics has two broad branches: microeconomics, where the unit of analysis is the individual agent, such as a household or firm, and macroeconomics, where the unit of analysis is an economy as a whole. Another division of the subject distinguishes positive economics, which seeks to predict and explain economic phenomena, from normative economics, which orders choices and actions by some criterion; such orderings necessarily involve subjective value judgments. Since the early part of the 20th century, economics has focused largely on measurable quantities, employing both theoretical models and empirical analysis. Quantitative models, however, can be traced as far back as the physiocratic school. Economic reasoning has been increasingly applied in recent decades to other social situations such as politics, law, psychology, history, religion, marriage and family life, and other social interactions.

The expanding domain of economics in the social sciences has been described as economic imperialism.

=== Education ===
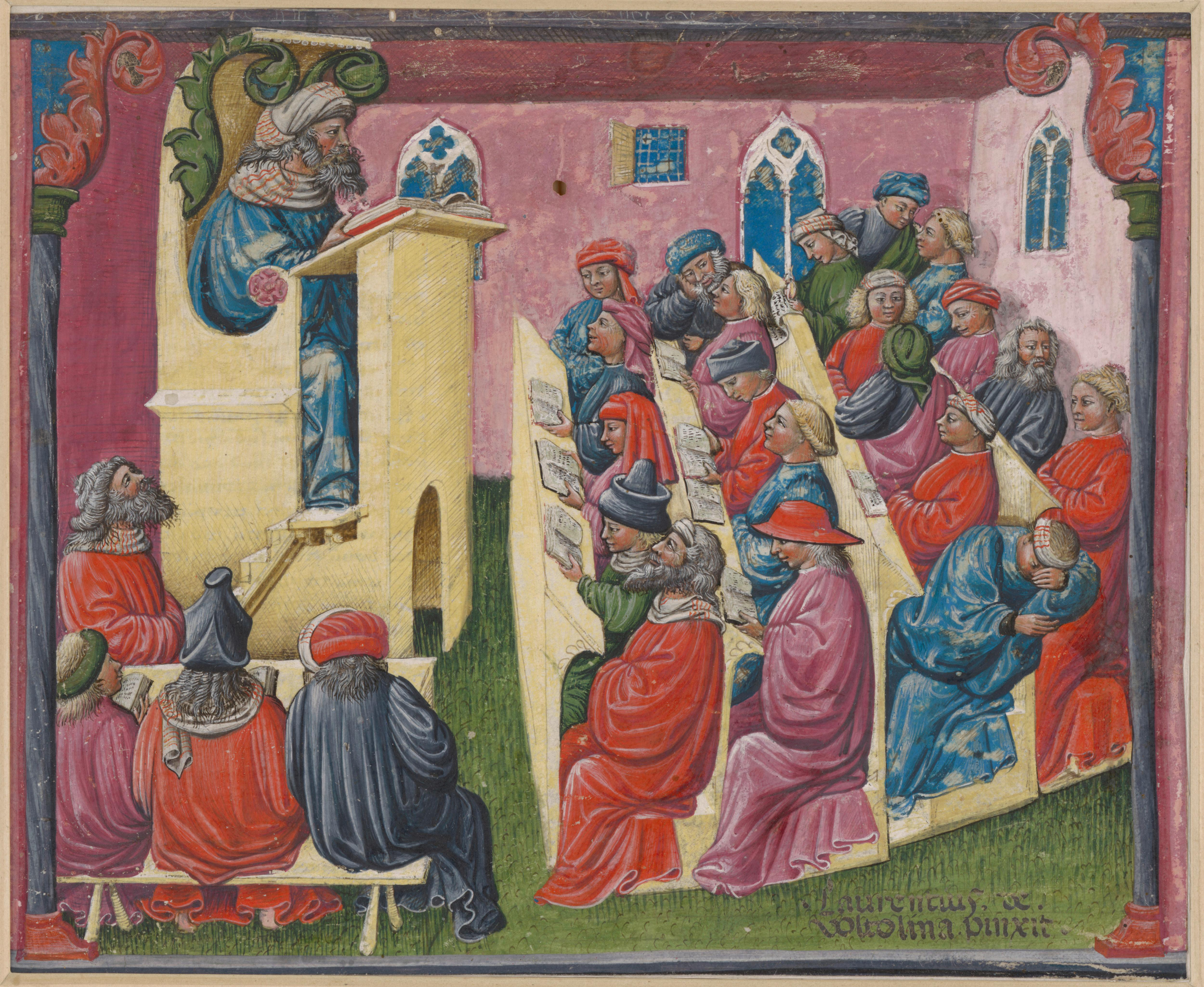
A depiction of world's oldest university, the University of Bologna, in Italy

Education encompasses teaching and learning specific skills, and also something less tangible but more profound: the imparting of knowledge, positive judgement and well-developed wisdom. Education has as one of its fundamental aspects the imparting of culture from generation to generation (see socialization). To educate means 'to draw out', from the Latineducare, or to facilitate the realization of an individual's potential and talents. It is an application of pedagogy, a body of theoretical and applied research relating to teaching and learning and draws on many disciplines such as psychology, philosophy, computer science, linguistics, neuroscience, sociology and anthropology.

=== Geography ===
Map of the Earth

Geography as a discipline can be split broadly into three main sub fields: human geography and physical geography and technical Geography .The former focuses largely on the built environment and how space is created, viewed and managed by humans as well as the influence humans have on the space they occupy. This may involve cultural geography, transportation, health, military operations, and cities. The latter examines the natural environment and how the climate, vegetation and life, soil, oceans, water and landforms are produced and interact (is also commonly regarded as an Earth Science). Physical geography examines phenomena related to the measurement of earth. As a result of the two subfields using different approaches a third field has emerged, which is environmental geography. Environmental geography combines physical and human geography and looks at the interactions between the environment and humans. Other branches of geography include social geography, regional geography, geomatics, and historical geography.

Geographers attempt to understand the Earth in terms of physical and spatial relationships. The first geographers focused on the science of mapmaking and finding ways to precisely project the surface of the earth. In this sense, geography bridges some gaps between the natural sciences and social sciences.

Modern geography is an all-encompassing discipline, closely related to Geographic Information Science, that seeks to understand humanity and its natural environment. The fields of urban planning, regional science, and planetology are closely related to geography. Practitioners of geography use many technologies and methods to collect data such as Geographic Information Systems, remote sensing, aerial photography, statistics, and global positioning systems.

=== History ===
History is the continuous, systematic narrative and research into past human events as interpreted through historiographical paradigms or theories. When used as the name of a field of study, history refers to the study and interpretation of the record of humans, societies, institutions, and any topic that has changed over time.

Traditionally, the study of history has been considered a part of the humanities. In modern academia, whether or not history remains a humanities-based subject is contested. In the United States the National Endowment for the Humanities includes history in its definition of humanities (as it does for applied linguistics). However, the National Research Council classifies history as a social science. The historical method comprises the techniques and guidelines by which historians use primary sources and other evidence to research and then to write history. The Social Science History Association, formed in 1976, brings together scholars from numerous disciplines interested in social history.

=== Law ===
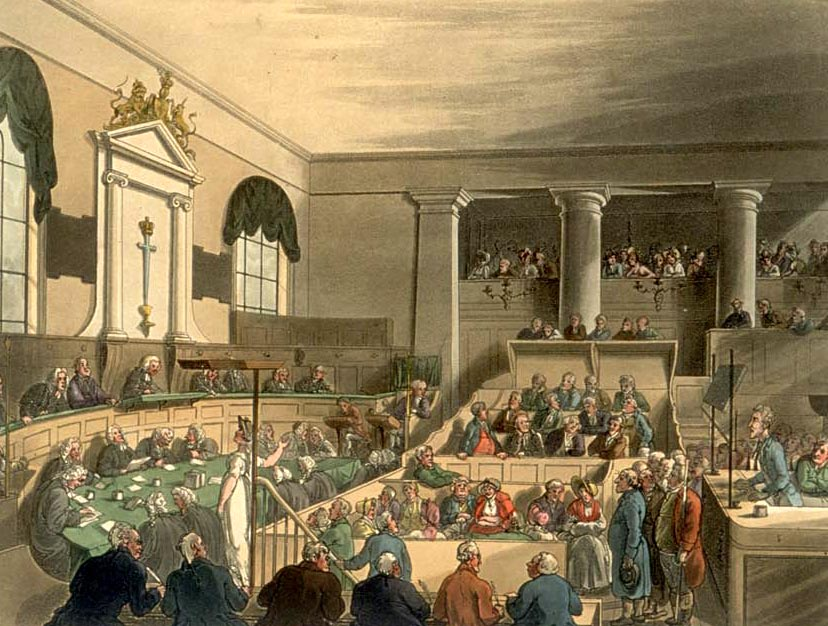
A trial at a criminal court, the Old Bailey in London

The study of law crosses the boundaries between the social sciences and humanities, depending on one's view of research into its objectives and effects. Law is not always enforceable, especially in the international relations context. It has been defined as a "system of rules", as an "interpretive concept" to achieve justice, as an "authority" to mediate people's interests, and even as "the command of a sovereign, backed by the threat of a sanction". The noun law derives from the Old English lagu, meaning something laid down or fixed and the adjective legal comes from the Latin word lex.

=== Linguistics ===
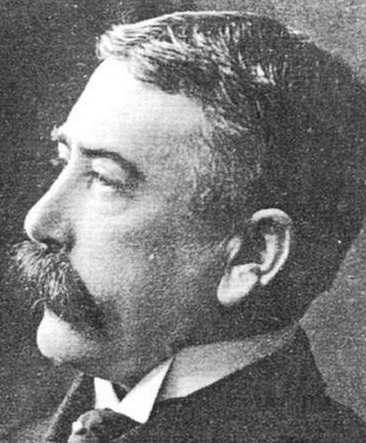
Ferdinand de Saussure, recognized as the father of modern linguistics

Linguistics investigates the cognitive and social aspects of human language. The field is divided into areas that focus on aspects of the linguistic signal, such as syntax (the study of the rules that govern the structure of sentences), semantics (the study of meaning), morphology (the study of the structure of words), phonetics (the study of speech sounds) and phonology (the study of the abstract sound system of a particular language); however, work in areas like evolutionary linguistics (the study of the origins and evolution of language) and psycholinguistics (the study of psychological factors in human language) cut across these divisions.

The overwhelming majority of modern research in linguistics takes a predominantly synchronic perspective (focusing on language at a particular point in time), and a great deal of it—partly owing to the influence of Noam Chomsky—aims at formulating theories of the cognitive processing of language. However, language does not exist in a vacuum, or only in the brain, and approaches like contact linguistics, creole studies, discourse analysis, social interactional linguistics, and sociolinguistics explore language in its social context. Sociolinguistics often makes use of traditional quantitative analysis and statistics in investigating the frequency of features, while some disciplines, like contact linguistics, focus on qualitative analysis. While certain areas of linguistics can thus be understood as clearly falling within the social sciences, other areas, like acoustic phonetics and neurolinguistics, draw on the natural sciences. Linguistics draws only secondarily on the humanities, which played a rather greater role in linguistic inquiry in the 19th and early 20th centuries. Ferdinand Saussure was one of the founders of 20th century linguistics.

=== Political science ===
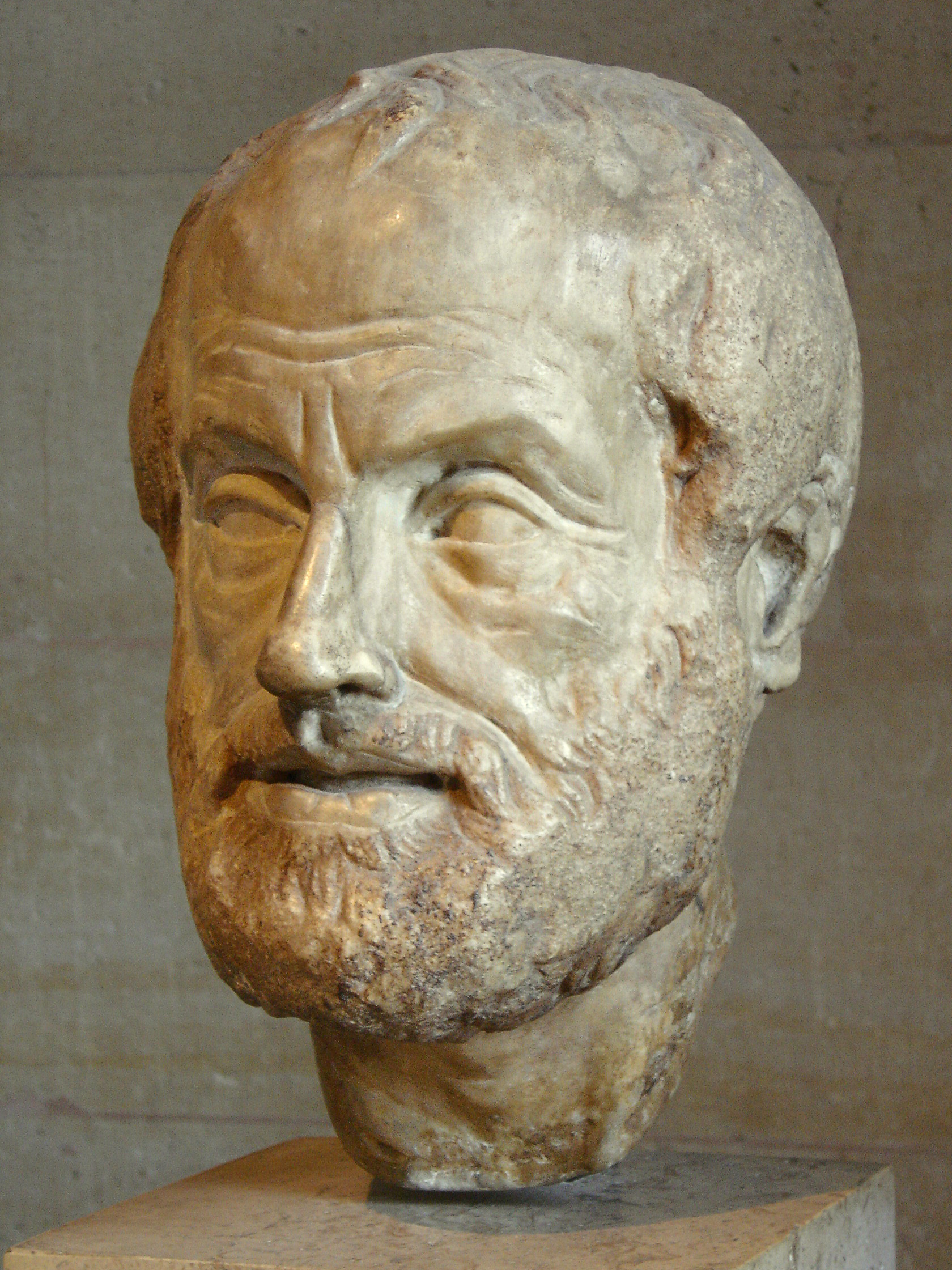
Aristotle asserted that man is a political animal in his Politics.

Political science is an academic and research discipline that deals with the theory and practice of politics and the description and analysis of political systems and political behaviour. Fields and subfields of political science include political economy, political theory and philosophy, civics and comparative politics, theory of direct democracy, apolitical governance, participatory direct democracy, national systems, cross-national political analysis, political development, international relations, foreign policy, international law, politics, public administration, administrative behaviour, public law, judicial behaviour, and public policy. Political science also studies power in international relations and the theory of great powers and superpowers.

Political science is methodologically diverse, although recent years have witnessed an upsurge in the use of the scientific method, that is, the proliferation of formal-deductive model building and quantitative hypothesis testing. Approaches to the discipline include rational choice, classical political philosophy, interpretivism, structuralism, and behaviouralism, realism, pluralism, and institutionalism. Political science, as one of the social sciences, uses methods and techniques that relate to the kinds of inquiries sought: primary sources such as historical documents, interviews, and official records, as well as secondary sources such as scholarly articles, are used in building and testing theories. Empirical methods include survey research, statistical analysis or econometrics, case studies, experiments, and model building.

=== Psychology ===
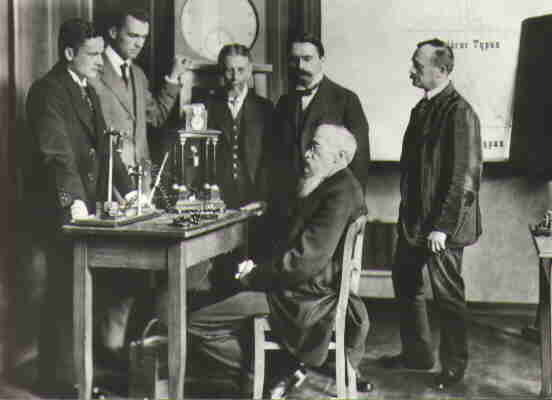
Wilhelm Maximilian Wundt was the founder of experimental psychology.

Psychology is an academic and applied field involving the study of behaviour and mental processes. Psychology also refers to the application of such knowledge to various spheres of human activity, including problems of individuals' daily lives and the treatment of mental illness. The word psychology comes from the Ancient Greek ψυχή (psyche, "soul" or "mind") and the suffix logy ("study").

Psychology differs from anthropology, economics, political science, and sociology in seeking to capture explanatory generalizations about the mental function and overt behaviour of individuals, while the other disciplines focus on creating descriptive generalizations about the functioning of social groups or situation-specific human behaviour. In practice, however, there is quite a lot of cross-fertilization that takes place among the various fields. Psychology differs from biology and neuroscience in that it is primarily concerned with the interaction of mental processes and behaviour, and of the overall processes of a system, and not simply the biological or neural processes themselves, though the subfield of neuropsychology combines the study of the actual neural processes with the study of the mental effects they have subjectively produced.

Many people associate psychology with clinical psychology, which focuses on assessment and treatment of problems in living and psychopathology. In reality, psychology has myriad specialties including social psychology, developmental psychology, cognitive psychology, educational psychology, industrial-organizational psychology, mathematical psychology, neuropsychology, and quantitative analysis of behaviour.

Psychology is a very broad science that is rarely tackled as a whole, major block. Although some subfields encompass a natural science base and a social science application, others can be clearly distinguished as having little to do with the social sciences or having a lot to do with the social sciences. For example, biological psychology is considered a natural science with a social scientific application (as is clinical medicine), social and occupational psychology are, generally speaking, purely social sciences, whereas neuropsychology is a natural science that lacks application out of the scientific tradition entirely.

=== Sociology ===
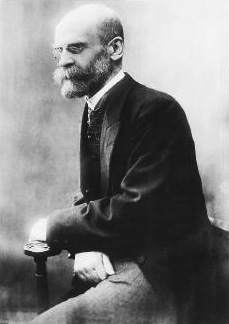
Émile Durkheim is considered one of the founding fathers of sociology.

Sociology is the systematic study of society, individuals' relationship to their societies, the consequences of difference, and other aspects of human social action. The meaning of the word comes from the suffix -logy, which means "study of", derived from Ancient Greek, and the stem soci-, which is from the Latin word socius, meaning "companion", or society in general.

Auguste Comte (1798–1857) coined the term sociology to describe a way to apply natural science principles and techniques to the social world in 1838. Comte endeavoured to unify history, psychology and economics through the descriptive understanding of the social realm. He proposed that social ills could be remedied through sociological positivism, an epistemological approach outlined in The Course in Positive Philosophy [1830–1842] and A General View of Positivism (1844). Though Comte is generally regarded as the "Father of Sociology", the discipline was formally established by another French thinker, Émile Durkheim (1858–1917), who developed positivism as a foundation to practical social research. Durkheim set up the first European department of sociology at the University of Bordeaux in 1895, publishing his Rules of the Sociological Method. In 1896, he established the journal L'Année sociologique. Durkheim's seminal monograph, Suicide (1897), a case study of suicide rates among Catholic and Protestant populations, distinguished sociological analysis from psychology or philosophy.

Karl Marx rejected Comte's positivism but nevertheless aimed to establish a science of society based on historical materialism, becoming recognized as a founding figure of sociology posthumously as the term gained broader meaning. Around the start of the 20th century, the first wave of German sociologists, including Max Weber and Georg Simmel, developed sociological antipositivism. The field may be broadly recognized as an amalgam of three modes of social thought in particular: Durkheimian positivism and structural functionalism; Marxist historical materialism and conflict theory; and Weberian antipositivism and verstehen analysis. American sociology broadly arose on a separate trajectory, with little Marxist influence, an emphasis on rigorous experimental methodology, and a closer association with pragmatism and social psychology. In the 1920s, the Chicago school developed symbolic interactionism. Meanwhile, in the 1930s, the Frankfurt School pioneered the idea of critical theory, an interdisciplinary form of Marxist sociology drawing upon thinkers as diverse as Sigmund Freud and Friedrich Nietzsche. Critical theory, after World War II, became highly influential literary criticism and the Birmingham School establishment of cultural studies.

Sociology evolved as an academic response to the challenges of modernity, such as industrialization, urbanization, secularization, and a perceived process of enveloping rationalization. The field generally concerns the social rules and processes that bind and separate people not only as individuals, but as members of associations, groups, communities and institutions, and includes the examination of the organization and development of human social life. The sociological field of interest ranges from the analysis of short contacts between anonymous individuals on the street to the study of global social processes. In the terms of sociologists Peter L. Berger and Thomas Luckmann, social scientists seek an understanding of the Social Construction of Reality. Most sociologists work in one or more subfields. One useful way to describe the discipline is as a cluster of sub-fields that examine different dimensions of society. For example, social stratification studies inequality and class structure; demography studies changes in population size or type; criminology examines criminal behaviour and deviance; and political sociology studies the interaction between society and state.

Since its inception, sociological epistemologies, methods, and frames of enquiry, have significantly expanded and diverged. Sociologists use a diversity of research methods, collecting both quantitative and qualitative data, draw upon empirical techniques, and engage critical theory. Common modern methods include case studies, historical research, interviewing, participant observation, social network analysis, survey research, statistical analysis, and model building, among other approaches. Since the late 1970s, many sociologists have tried to make the discipline useful for purposes beyond the academy. The results of sociological research aid educators, lawmakers, administrators, developers, and others interested in resolving social problems and formulating public policy, through subdisciplinary areas such as evaluation research, methodological assessment, and public sociology.

In the early 1970s, women sociologists began to question sociological paradigms and the invisibility of women in sociological studies, analysis, and courses. In 1969, feminist sociologists challenged the discipline's androcentrism at the American Sociological Association's annual conference. This led to the founding of the organization Sociologists for Women in Society, and, eventually, a new sociology journal, Gender & Society. Today, the sociology of gender is considered to be one of the most prominent sub-fields in the discipline.

New sociological sub-fields continue to appear — such as community studies, computational sociology, environmental sociology, network analysis, actor-network theory, gender studies, and a growing list, many of which are cross-disciplinary in nature.

== Additional fields of study ==
Additional applied or interdisciplinary fields related to the social sciences or are applied social sciences include:

- Archaeology, a science that is focused on the study of human cultures by means of the recovery, documentation, analysis, and interpretation of material remains and environmental data, including architecture, artifacts, features, and landscapes.
- Area studies, interdisciplinary fields of research and scholarship pertaining to particular geographical, national/federal, or cultural regions.
- Behavioural science, which encompasses disciplines that explore the activities of and interactions among organisms in the natural world.
- Computational social science, an umbrella field encompassing computational approaches within the social sciences.
- Demography, the statistical study of human populations.
- Development studies, a branch of social science that addresses issues of concern to developing countries.
- Environmental social science, the broad study of interrelations between humans and the natural environment.
- Environmental studies, which integrates social, humanistic, and natural science perspectives on the relation between humans and the natural environment.
- Gender studies, which is focused on the study of gender identity, masculinity, femininity, transgender issues, and sexuality.
- Information science, an interdisciplinary science primarily concerned with the collection, classification, manipulation, storage, retrieval and dissemination of information.
- International studies, which covers both international relations (the study of foreign affairs and global issues among states within the international system) and international education.
- Legal management, a social sciences discipline that is designed for students interested in the study of state and legal elements.
- Library science, a field that applies the practices, perspectives, and tools of management, information technology, education, and other areas to libraries; and the collection, organization, preservation and dissemination of information resources.
- Management, which consists of various levels of leadership and administration of an organization in all business and human organizations. It is the effective execution of getting people together to accomplish desired goals and objectives through adequate planning, executing and controlling activities.
- Marketing, the identification of human needs and wants, defines and measures their magnitude for demand and understanding the process of consumer buying behaviour to formulate products and services, pricing, promotion and distribution to satisfy these needs and wants through exchange processes and building long-term relationships.
- Political economy, the study of production, buying and selling, and their relations with law, custom, and government.
- Public administration, the development, implementation and study of branches of government policy. Though public administration has been historically referred to as government management, it increasingly encompasses non-governmental organizations (NGOs) that also operate with a similar, primary dedication to the betterment of humanity.
- Religious studies and Western esoteric studies, which incorporate social-scientific research on phenomena deemed religious.

== Methodology ==
=== Social research ===
The origin of the survey can be traced back at least as early as the Domesday Book in 1086, while some scholars pinpoint the origin of demography to 1663 with the publication of John Graunt's Natural and Political Observations upon the Bills of Mortality. Social research began most intentionally, however, with the positivist philosophy of science in the 19th century.

In contemporary usage, "social research" is a relatively autonomous term, encompassing the work of practitioners from various disciplines that share in its aims and methods. Social scientists employ a range of methods in order to analyse a vast breadth of social phenomena; from census survey data derived from millions of individuals, to the in-depth analysis of a single agent's social experiences; from monitoring what is happening on contemporary streets, to the investigation of ancient historical documents. The methods originally rooted in classical sociology and statistical mathematics have formed the basis for research in other disciplines, such as political science, media studies, and marketing and market research.

Social research methods may be divided into two broad schools:

- Quantitative designs approach social phenomena through quantifiable evidence, and often rely on statistical analysis of many cases (or across intentionally designed treatments in an experiment) to create valid and reliable general claims.
- Qualitative designs emphasize understanding of social phenomena through direct observation, communication with participants, or analysis of texts, and may stress contextual and subjective accuracy over generality.

Social scientists will commonly combine quantitative and qualitative approaches as part of a multi-strategy design. Questionnaires, field-based data collection, archival database information and laboratory-based data collections are some of the measurement techniques used. It is noted the importance of measurement and analysis, focusing on the (difficult to achieve) goal of objective research or statistical hypothesis testing. A mathematical model uses mathematical language to describe a system. The process of developing a mathematical model is termed 'mathematical modelling' (also modeling). A mathematical model is "a representation of the essential aspects of an existing system (or a system to be constructed) that presents knowledge of that system in usable form". Mathematical models can take many forms, including but not limited to dynamical systems, statistical models, differential equations, or game theoretic models.

Social scientists often conduct program evaluation, which is a systematic method for collecting, analyzing, and using information to answer questions about projects, policies and programs, particularly about their effectiveness and efficiency. In both the public and private sectors, stakeholders often want to know whether the programs they are funding, implementing, voting for, receiving or objecting to are producing the intended effect. While program evaluation first focuses around this definition, important considerations often include how much the program costs per participant, how the program could be improved, whether the program is worthwhile, whether there are better alternatives, if there are unintended outcomes, and whether the program goals are appropriate and useful.

Some social science research areas were found to have political academic bias. Social science as a whole has also been charged by some critics with systemically ignoring and denying certain findings and perspectives on human behaviour due to political reasons, such as rejecting biological approaches in social science research due to ideologically motivated resistance to genetic and evolutionary explanations for social phenomena such as war and violence.

=== Theory ===
Some social theorists emphasize the subjective nature of research. These writers espouse social theory perspectives that include various types of the following:

- Critical theory is the examination and critique of society and culture, drawing from knowledge across social sciences and humanities disciplines.
- Dialectical materialism is the philosophy of Karl Marx, which he formulated by taking the dialectic of Hegel and joining it to the materialism of Feuerbach.
- Feminist theory is the extension of feminism into theoretical, or philosophical discourse; it aims to understand the nature of gender inequality.
- Marxist theories, such as revolutionary theory, scientific socialism, and class theory, cover work in philosophy that is strongly influenced by Karl Marx's materialist approach to theory or is written by Marxists.
- Phronetic social science is a theory and methodology for doing social science focusing on ethics and political power, based on a contemporary interpretation of Aristotelian phronesis.
- Post-colonial theory is a reaction to the cultural legacy of colonialism.
- Postmodernism refers to a point of departure for works of literature, drama, architecture, cinema, and design, as well as in marketing and business and in the interpretation of history, law, culture and religion in the late 20th century.
- Rational choice theory is a framework for understanding and often formally modeling social and economic behaviour.
- Social constructionism considers how social phenomena develop in social contexts.
- Structuralism is an approach to the human sciences that attempts to analyze a specific field (for instance, mythology) as a complex system of interrelated parts.
- Structural functionalism is a sociological paradigm that addresses what social functions various elements of the social system perform in regard to the entire system.

Other fringe social theorists delve into the alternative nature of research. These writers share social theory perspectives that include various types of the following:

- Anti-intellectualism describes a sentiment of critique towards, or evaluation of, intellectuals and intellectual pursuits.
- Antiscience is a position critical of science and the scientific method.

== Education ==
Most universities offer degrees in social science fields.

== People associated with the social sciences ==
- Al-Kindi
- Augustine
- Franz Boas
- Manuel Castells
- Confucius
- Wade Davis
- W. E. B. Du Bois
- Louis Dumont
- Norbert Elias
- Friedrich Engels
- Frantz Fanon
- Milton Friedman
- Anthony Giddens
- Erving Goffman
- Thomas Hobbes
- Arlie Hochschild
- David Hume
- Marie Jahoda
- John Maynard Keynes
- Ibn Khaldun
- Paul F. Lazarsfeld
- John Locke
- John Lubbock, 1st Baron Avebury
- Niklas Luhmann
- Niccolò Machiavelli
- Karl Marx
- Marcel Mauss
- Margaret Mead
- John Stuart Mill
- Montesquieu
- Jean Piaget
- Steven Pinker
- Plato
- John Rawls
- David Ricardo
- Edward Said
- Jean-Baptiste Say
- Alfred Schutz
- B.F. Skinner
- Adam Smith
- Herbert Spencer
- Deborah Tannen
- Victor Turner
- Friedrich Hayek

== See also ==
=== General ===
- Outline of social science
- Humanities
- Structure and agency

=== Methods ===
- Ethnography
- Participatory action research
- Representation theory

=== Other ===
- Ethnology
- Gulbenkian commission
- Labelling
- Obshestvovedeny
- Philosophy of social sciences

== Bibliography ==
- Michie, Jonathan, ed. Reader's Guide to the Social Sciences (2 vol. 2001) 1970 pages annotating the major topics in the late 20th century in all the social sciences.

=== 20th and 21st centuries sources ===
- Neil J. Smelser and Paul B. Baltes (2001). International Encyclopedia of the Social & Behavioral Sciences, Amsterdam: Elsevier.
- Byrne, D.S. (1998). Complexity theory and the social sciences: an introduction. Routledge. ISBN 978-0-415-16296-8
- Kuper, A., and Kuper, J. (1985). The Social Science Encyclopedia. London: Routledge & Kegan Paul. (ed., a limited preview of the 1996 version is available)
- Lave, C.A., and March, J.G. (1993). An introduction to models in the social sciences. Lanham, MD: University Press of America.
- Perry, John and Erna Perry. Contemporary Society: An Introduction to Social Science (12th Edition, 2008), college textbook
- Potter, D. (1988). Society and the social sciences: An introduction. London: Routledge [u.a.].
- David L. Sills and Robert K. Merton (1968). International Encyclopedia of the Social Sciences.
- Seligman, Edwin R.A. and Alvin Johnson (1934). Encyclopedia of the Social Sciences. (13 vol.)
- Ward, L.F. (1924). Dynamic sociology, or applied social science: As based upon statical sociology and the less complex sciences. New York: D. Appleton.
- Leavitt, F.M., and Brown, E. (1920). Elementary social science. New York: Macmillan.
- Bogardus, E.S. (1913). Introduction to the social sciences: A textbook outline. Los Angeles: Ralston Press.
- Small, A.W. (1910). The meaning of social science. Chicago: The University of Chicago Press.

=== 19th century sources ===
- Andrews, S.P. (1888). The science of society. Boston, Mass: Sarah E. Holmes.
- Denslow, V.B. (1882). Modern thinkers principally upon social science: What they think, and why. Chicago: Belford, Clarke & Co.
- Harris, William Torrey (1879). Method of Study in Social Science: A Lecture Delivered Before the St. Louis Social Science Association, March 4, 1879. St. Louis: G.I. Jones and Co., 1879.
- Hamilton, R.S. (1873). Present status of social science. A review, historical and critical, of the progress of thought in social philosophy. New York: H.L. Hinton.
- Carey, H.C. (1867). Principles of social science. Philadelphia: J.B. Lippincott & Co. [etc.]. Volume I, Volume II, Volume III.
- Calvert, G.H. (1856). Introduction to social science: A discourse in three parts. New York: Redfield.

=== General sources ===
- Backhouse, Roger E., and Philippe Fontaine, eds. A historiography of the modern social sciences (Cambridge University Press, 2014).
- Backhouse, Roger E.; Fontaine, Philippe, eds. (2010). The History of the Social Sciences Since 1945. Cambridge University Press.; covers the conceptual, institutional, and wider histories of economics, political science, sociology, social anthropology, psychology, and human geography.
- Delanty, G. (1997). Social science: Beyond constructivism and realism. Minneapolis: Univ. of Minnesota Press.
- Hargittai, E. (2009). Research Confidential: Solutions to Problems Most Social Scientists Pretend They Never Have. Ann Arbor: University of Michigan Press. ISBN 978-0472026531. Archived from the original on September 14, 2012.
- Heim, K. M. (1987). Social Scientific Information Needs for Numeric Data: The Evolution of the International Data Archive Infrastructure. Collection Management, 9(1), 1–53.
- Hunt, E.F.; Colander, D.C. (2008). Social science: An introduction to the study of society. Boston: Peason/Allyn and Bacon. ISBN 978-0-205-52406-8.
- Carey, H.C.; McKean, K. (1883). Manual of social science; Being a condensation of the Principles of social science. Philadelphia: Baird.
- Galavotti, M.C. (2003). Observation and experiment in the natural and social sciences. Boston studies in the philosophy of science. Vol. 232. Dordrecht: Kluwer Academic. ISBN 978-1-4020-1251-8.
- Gorton, W.A. (2006). Karl Popper and the social sciences. SUNY series in the philosophy of the social sciences. Albany: State University of New York Press.
- Harris, F.R. (1973). Social science and national policy. New Brunswick, N.J.: Transaction Books. ISBN 978-1-4128-3445-2. distributed by Dutton
- Krimerman, L.I. (1969). The nature and scope of social science: A critical anthology. New York: Appleton-Century-Crofts. ISBN 978-0-390-52678-6.
- Rule, J.B. (1997). Theory and progress in social science. Cambridge: Cambridge University Press. ISBN 978-0-521-57365-8.
- Shionoya, Y. (1997). Schumpeter and the idea of social science: A metatheoretical study. Historical perspectives on modern economics. Cambridge: Cambridge University Press.
- Singleton, Royce A.; Straits, Bruce C. (1988). Approaches to Social Research. Oxford University Press. ISBN 978-0-19-514794-0. Archived from the original on March 3, 2007.
- Thomas, D. (1979). Naturalism and Social Science: A Post-Empiricist Philosophy of Social Science. CUP Archive. ISBN 978-0-521-29660-1.
- Trigg, R. (2001). Understanding social science: A philosophical introduction to the social sciences. Malden, Mass: Blackwell Publishers.
- Weber, M. (1906) [1904]. The Relations of the Rural Community to Other Branches of Social Science, Congress of Arts and Science: Universal Exposition. St. Louis: Houghton, Mifflin and Company.
- Creswell, John W. Educational research: planning, conducting, and evaluating quantitative and qualitative research. ISBN 978-1-299-95719-0. OCLC 859836343.

=== Academic resources ===
- The Annals of the American Academy of Political and Social Science, ISSN 1552-3349 (electronic) ISSN 0002-7162 (paper), Sage Publications
- Efferson, Charles; Richerson, Peter J. (March 16, 2007). "A prolegomenon to nonlinear empiricism in the human behavioral sciences". Biology & Philosophy. 22 (1): 1–33. doi:10.1007/s10539-005-9013-7.

=== Opponents and critics ===
- George H. Smith (2014). Intellectuals and Libertarianism: Thomas Sowell and Robert Nisbet
- Phil Hutchinson, Rupert Read and Wes Sharrock (2008). There's No Such Thing as a Social Science. ISBN 978-0-7546-4776-8
- Sabia, D.R., and Wallulis, J. (1983). Changing social science: Critical theory and other critical perspectives. Albany: State University of New York Press.
