= Paolo Rossi Monti =

Italian philosopher (1923–2012)

- Born: 30 December 1923; Urbino, Italy
- Died: 14 January 2012 (aged 88); Florence, Italy

Education
- Education: University of Florence (PhD)
- Doctoral advisor: Eugenio Garin

Philosophical work
- Era: 21st-century philosophy
- Region: Western philosophy
- Institutions: University of Florence
- Doctoral students: Alessandro Pagnini

Paolo Rossi Monti (30 December 1923 – 14 January 2012) was an Italian philosopher and professor of philosophy at the University of Florence.

== Career ==
Paolo Rossi studied first in Ancona and then in Bologna, where in 1942 he enrolled in philosophy. He graduated in 1946 in Florence, with the philosopher of humanism Eugenio Garin, with whom he also obtained a specialization diploma in 1947. Between 1947 and 1949 he taught history and philosophy at the Liceo Classico "Plinio il Giovane" in Città di Castello (PG). From 1950 to 1959 he was assistant to Antonio Banfi at the University of Milan. Between 1950 and 1955 he worked on the Children's Encyclopedia at the Mondadori publishing house. From 1955 he taught the history of philosophy, first at the University of Milan (until 1961), then in Cagliari (1961-1962) and Bologna. In 1962 he was adopted by his maternal aunt Elena Monti. Consequently, his surname and that of his children became Rossi Monti in the official documents. However, since at the time the philosopher had already published three books and several essays with the surname Rossi, he decided for the sake of clarity to continue using only the surname Rossi in his cultural activity. From 1966 he settled permanently in Florence, where he held the chair of the history of philosophy at the university's faculty of literature until 1999. In the same 1999 he was appointed professor emeritus by the University of Florence. Among his sons, Mario Rossi Monti (1953), psychiatrist, is professor of clinical psychology at the University of Urbino.

== Works ==
- Giacomo Aconcio. 1952.
- Francesco Bacone. Dalla magia alla scienza. Bari 1957 (= Biblioteca di cultura moderna. Band 517).
- Clavis Universalis: arti della memoria e logica combinatoria da Lullo a Leibniz. 1960,
- I filosofi e le macchine 1400–1700. Feltrinelli, 1962.
- I segni del tempo. Storia della Terra e storia delle nazioni da Hooke a Vico,
- Le sterminate antichità : studi vichiani. 1969.
- Aspetti della rivoluzione scientifica. 1971.
- La rivoluzione scientifica. Loescher, 1973.
- I segni del tempo : storia della Terra e storia delle nazioni da Hooke a Vico. 1979.
- La nuova ragione. Scienza e cultura nella società contemporanea. il Mulino, 1981.
- Clavis universalis. Arti della memoria e logica combinatoria da Lullo a Leibniz. 1983.
- I ragni e le formiche : un'apologia della storia della scienza. 1986.
- Storia della scienza moderna e contemporanea. Tea, 1988.
- La scienza e la filosofia dei moderni. Bollati Boringhieri, 1989.
- Il passato, la memoria, l'oblio. 1991.
- Herausgeber: La filosofia. UTET, Turin, 1995, 4 Bände.
- La nascita della scienza moderna in Europa. 1997; deutsch gleichfalls 1997: Die Geburt der modernen Wissenschaft in Europa.
- Introduzione. in Forse Queneau - Enciclopedia delle scienze anomale. Zanichelli, Bologna 1999.
- Le sterminate antichità e nuovi saggi vichiani. La Nuova Italia, Florenz 1999.
- Un altro presente. il Mulino, 1999.
- Bambini, sogni, furori : tre lezioni di storia delle idee. Feltrinelli, Mailand 2001.
- Hermeticism, Rationality and the Scientific Revolution. In: Maria Luisa Righini-Bonelli, William R. Shea (ed.): Reason, Experiment, and Mysticism in the Scientific Revolution. New York 1975, S. 247–273.
