= Sarcophagus of Princess Olga =

Carved slate sarcophagus from the 11th century

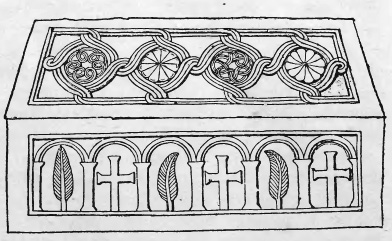
Sketch of carved patterns on the front side of the sarcophagus from the “Illustrated History of Ukraine” by Mikhail Grushevsky (1921).

The sarcophagus of Princess Olga from the Tithe Church is a carved slate sarcophagus from the 11th century, found during excavations of the Tithe Church in Kyiv in 1826. Kept in the St. Sophia Cathedral. Some researchers believe that Princess Olga, who is known to have been reburied in the Church of the Tithes by her grandson Prince Vladimir around 1007, was buried there. The sarcophagus is exhibited in Sofia of Kyiv as the “Sarcophagus of Princess Olga”. However, this attribution is questioned by most researchers, although the possibility that Princess Olga could have been buried in the sarcophagus is not completely ruled out.

The sarcophagus is covered with detailed carvings in the Byzantine style, similar to those found on the marble sarcophagus of Yaroslav the Wise and on the slate slabs of the choir of St. Sophia Cathedral.

== Description ==
The sarcophagus is made of seven slabs of red slate (pyrophyllite slate), 4 cm thick, probably mined near Ovruch. The plates are connected internally by two iron brackets. The shape of the lower part is a rectangular parallelepiped, and the upper part (lid) is gable. The length of the sarcophagus is 198 cm, width 60 cm, height 96 cm.

The composition of the sarcophagus is like a house, made of seven individual slabs fastened together, covered with a gable roof. The relief treatment of its sides is different: one longitudinal side, apparently intended to be moved towards the wall, is decorated with only six identical simple crosses with trapezoidally expanded ends of the branches. Three of them are on the half of the lid and three, respectively, on the side wall. The front side of the sarcophagus is richly decorated with relief, as is the half of the lid covering it. Three crosses and three cypress trees alternate on the wall, placed in six identical spans of the arcature belt. There are four rosettes on the lid, connected by wires to each other and to the frame. The weaving tape has a wide central roll and is profiled along the edges with deep grooves. The end walls of the sarcophagus are decorated with a flourished cross and a cross “on a sphere” of the same shape. Thus, the sarcophagus is an excellent example of wickerwork from the Middle Byzantine period.

== Discovery and exploration ==
The sarcophagus was first found in 1826 during excavations conducted by architect Nikolai Efimov. It was located outside the main foundation of the Church of the Tithes at the northern wall between the lysens, walled up on the right side of the entrance to the 12th-century plinthic tomb. The sarcophagus was studied in more detail during repeated excavations by Dmitry Mileev in 1908 (in the interim, the sarcophagus remained buried at the discovery site).

The sarcophagus contained a preserved complete skeleton, on which, according to Efimov's initial report, there were the remains of women's clothing: a brocade bedspread and women's shoes. A 1908 study revealed that the skeleton was in poor condition, it was reported that the remains of clothing and leather from boots were then stored on it, and the presence of traces of purple oxides on the bones indicate that metal objects were not preserved. The sex of the buried person was not clearly established for the skeleton, although the relatively small size indicated a woman or teenager.

After Mileev's excavations, the sarcophagus was filled up again. In 1918, it was excavated for the third time and moved to the Historical Museum. Later, the sarcophagus was moved to St. Sophia Cathedral.

== Dating ==
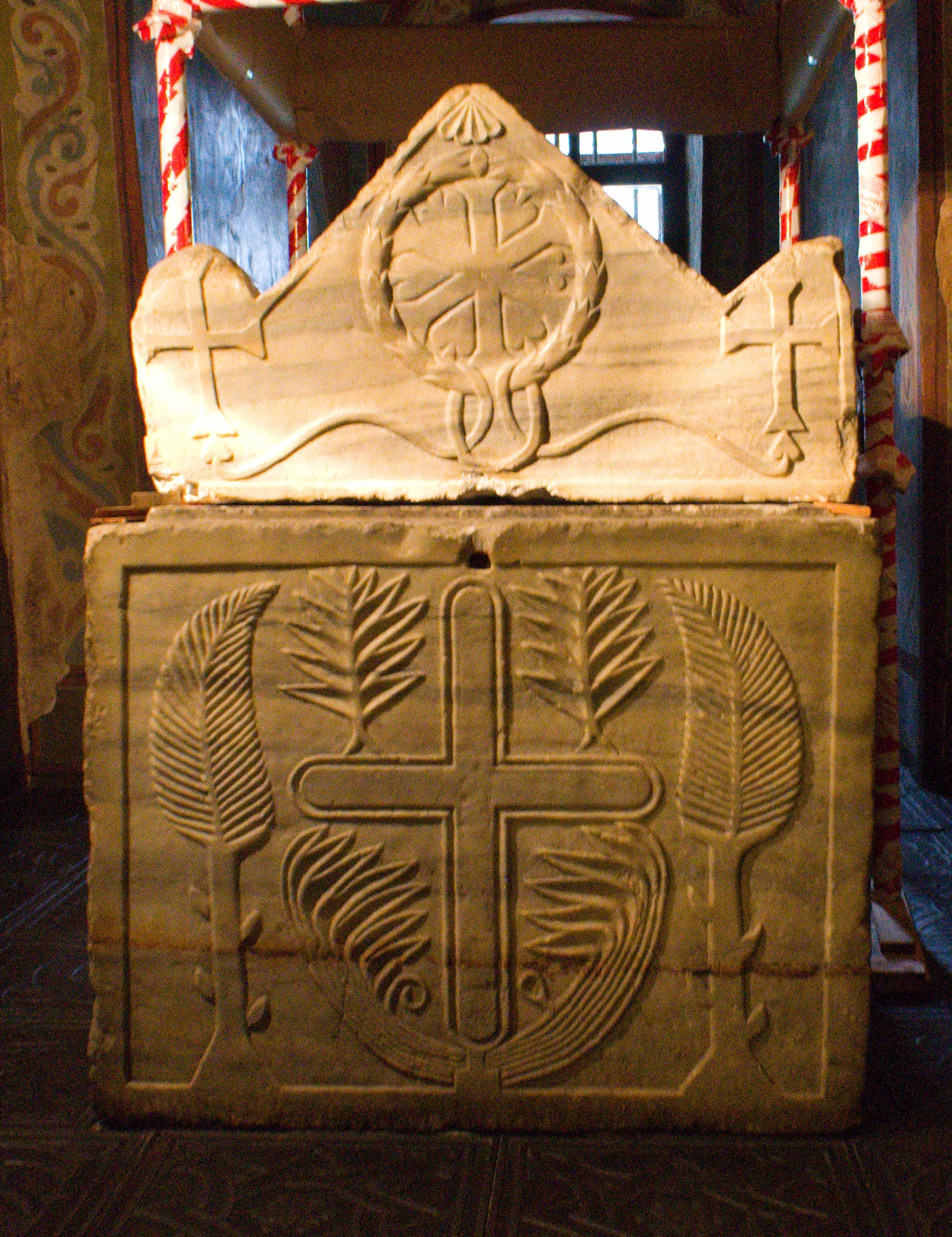
The end wall of the sarcophagus of Yaroslav the Wise. The same elements are noticeable.

Researchers date the sarcophagus mainly to the beginning of the first half of the 11th century, but there are also hypotheses regarding the 10th or 12th century.

The carving is made in the same Byzantine style as on the marble sarcophagus of Yaroslav the Wise; in particular, similar images of cypress trees and crosses are used. This type of decoration is common in Byzantine reliefs from the 11th century. A. N. Grabar noted that similar decoration (in particular, rows of arches) is found on some sarcophagi depicted in the Minology of Basil II miniatures. It associated the slate sarcophagus, like the sarcophagus of Yaroslav the Wise, as an example of Constantinople sculpture of the first third of the 11th century.

According to N. E. Makarenko, the difference in the design of the walls indicates that the two masters made the sarcophagus at the end of the 10th-11th centuries in different manners and is the result of Byzantine influence coming through the Balkans. V. G. Putsko agrees with him, believing that at least two craftsmen worked on the sarcophagus. However, he explains the difference in decor by the fact that the masters did not copy entire compositional schemes, only individual elements. M. K. Karger believes that by the 11th century, local stone-cutters in Kyiv made sarcophagi for the Kyiv nobility. “Among them, along with smooth-walled ones, sarcophagi are also known, completely covered with bas-relief carvings.”

Although the carving motifs on the sarcophagus are traditional for Byzantine sculpture of the 11th century, they are also found on monuments of the 12th-13th centuries, for example, on reliefs from Smyrna from the late 11th-12th centuries or Thessaloniki from the 12th-13th centuries. This extends the dating of the slate sarcophagus to the 11th-12th centuries.

== Attribution ==
The Church of the Tithes was built as a cathedral at the princely court and from the very beginning became the grand ducal tomb. Vladimir moved the tomb of Princess Olga to the church, then in 1011 one of his wives, the Byzantine Anna, was buried there, and in 1015 Vladimir himself was buried next to her. In 1078, the coffin of Prince Izyaslav Yaroslavich was placed in the Tithe Church. In addition, in 1044, Yaroslav the Wise posthumously baptized his uncles, princes Yaropolk and Oleg Svyatoslavich, and moved their burials to the Tithe Church.

The chronicles mention only two women buried in the Church of the Tithes—Princesses Olga (1007) and Anna (1011). Anna, like Vladimir, was buried in a marble sarcophagus, but there was no mention of Olga's sarcophagus. Therefore, immediately after its discovery, the slate sarcophagus began to be attributed to Princess Olga. Archaeological studies of the Church of the Tithes revealed a large number of fragments of at least one, completely destroyed, marble monolithic sarcophagus, which in shape, size and carving was very similar to the sarcophagus of Yaroslav the Wise in the St. Sophia Cathedral. This confirms that there were marble sarcophagi in the Church of the Tithes, as the chronicles report, and at least Prince Vladimir was buried in such a sarcophagus, which means that the reports of the burial of Princess Anna in a marble sarcophagus are plausible. That is, it is unlikely that the slate sarcophagus from the Church of the Tithes could have belonged to Princess Anna.

However, most researchers believe that the slate sarcophagus was discovered in its original location. Therefore, it is unlikely that Princess Olga could have been buried outside the Tithe Church near its wall, instead of being buried inside the temple. The appearance of this sarcophagus does not coincide with the chronicle description of the sarcophagus of Princess Olga, according to which there was a window in the upper part of the sarcophagus through which the body of the princess could be seen. However, even if we accept the chronicle description of the sarcophagus as accurate, this does not exclude the possibility of reburying the princess in another sarcophagus or changing the lid slab.

In 1824, Kondrat Lokhvitsky, a rival of Efimov, was the first to attempt to excavate the Church of the Tithes. Among other things, he found three slate sarcophagi, but their further fate is unknown. Also on the territory of the church, in addition to fragments of a marble sarcophagus, fragments of at least five slate ones were found. Not all burials of the Church of the Tithes were mentioned in the chronicles, and perhaps this was one of such burials. It is also not completely ruled out that the skeleton could have been male, and the remains of clothing and shoes were mistakenly interpreted as female. In general, the question of the attribution of the sarcophagus remains unresolved, but it is accepted that a member of the family of Kyiv princes was buried in it.
