= Alessandro Pagnini =

Italian philosopher (born 1949)

- Born: 1949 (age 76–77)

Education
- Education: University of Florence (PhD)
- Doctoral advisor: Paolo Rossi Monti

Philosophical work
- Era: 21st-century philosophy
- Region: Western philosophy
- Institutions: University of Florence

Alessandro Pagnini (born 1949) is an Italian philosopher and Professor of History of Contemporary Philosophy at the University of Florence. He is known for his works on history of philosophy. Pagnini is the editor of Philosophical Inquiries.

== Career ==
He received his PhD in History of Philosophy from the University of Florence, Faculty of Letters and Philosophy, with a thesis on the impact of French post-structuralism on the aesthetics, poetics and theory of literature in Italy under the supervision of Paolo Rossi Monti. In March 1976 he benefited from a C.N.R. scholarship, and since September 1981 he carried out teaching and research activities as a confirmed researcher at the Department of Philosophy of the University of Florence. In the academic year 1979-80 he won the competition for a substitute position on the chair of Philosophy and Pedagogy which he taught at the Faculty of Languages of the University of Pisa. From the Academic Year 1993–94 to the A.Y. 1999–2000, he was assistant professor of History of Contemporary Philosophy at the Department of Philosophy of the University of Florence, and from the A.A. 2000-2001 he was associate professor of History of Contemporary Philosophy at the same department.

== Books ==
- Experience, Reality, and Scientific Explanation: Essays in Honour of Merrilee and Wesley Salmon, Maria Carla Galavotti, Alessandro Pagnini
- Realismo/antirealismo (Firenze 1995)
- Teoria della conoscenza (Milano 1997)
- Filosofia della medicina (Roma, 2010)
