= Sarah McGrath =

American philosopher (born 1972)

- Born: 1972 (age 53–54)
- Awards: John Templeton Foundation grant (2014-15)

Education
- Education: MIT (PhD), Tufts University (MA), University of Arizona (BA)
- Thesis: Causation in Metaphysics and Moral Theory (2002)
- Doctoral advisor: Ned Hall
- Other advisors: Elizabeth Harman, Carolina Sartorio, Robert Stalnaker, Judith Thomson

Philosophical work
- Era: 21st-century philosophy
- Region: Western philosophy
- Institutions: Princeton University
- Main interests: metaethics, moral epistemology
- Notable ideas: moral peer disagreement
- Website: https://sites.google.com/view/smcgrath/home

Sarah McGrath (born 1972) is an American philosopher and professor of philosophy at Princeton University. She is known for her works on meta-ethics and moral epistemology.

== Books ==
- Moral Knowledge, Oxford University Press 2019
