= Lyakhchytsy =

Village in Brest Region, Belarus

Lyakhchytsy Ляхчыцы (Belarusian)
- Village
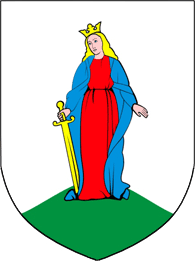
- Flag Seal

- Location in Belarus
- Coordinates: 52°5′13″N 24°23′45″E
- Country: Belarus
- Region: Brest Region
- District: Kobryn District
- Founded: 1563
- Time zone: UTC+3 (MSK)
- Postal code: 225866

Lyakhchytsy (Belarusian: Ляхчыцы, romanized: Liachčycy; Russian: Ляхчицы, romanized: Lyakhchitsy; Polish: Lachczyce) is a village in Kobryn District, Brest Region, Belarus. It is located 15 kilometres (9.3 mi) from Kobryn and 65 kilometres (40 mi) from Brest. It is part of Khidry selsoviet.

== History ==
According to legend, a certain princess Olga was buried on a hill near the settlement of Vladimir-in-Volhynia.

It was first mentioned in historical records from 1563. In 1795, the village, along with the rest of eastern Poland, was annexed by the Russian Empire with the effect of the Partitions of Poland. Between 1921 and 1939 it was part of Poland. In 1939, the Soviet Union retook the town and attached it to the Byelorussian SSR. Between 1941 and 1944, it was occupied by Nazi Germany until its liberation by the Red Army in 1944. Since 1991, it has been a part of the independent Belarus.

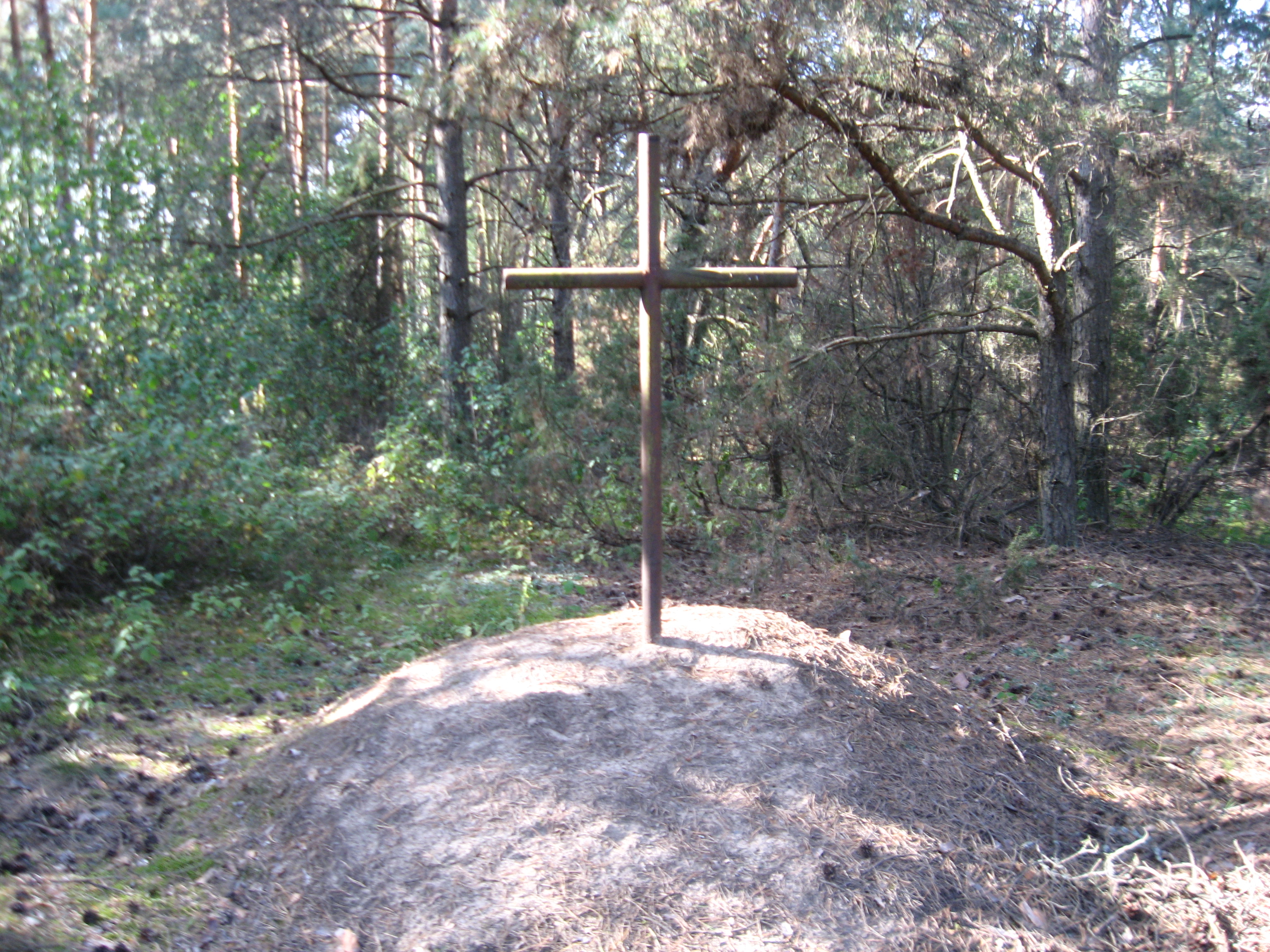
Cross on Prince's Hill
