= Olga of Kiev =

Princess of Kiev, Orthodox saint (c. 890–925)

Saint Olga of Kiev
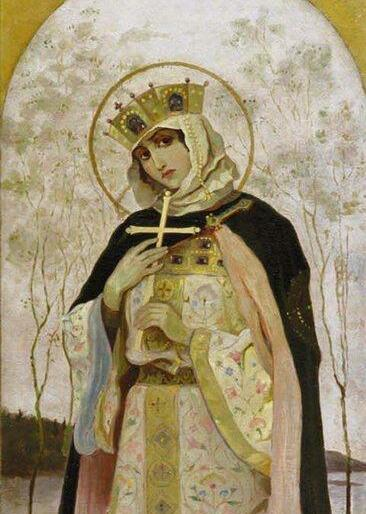
- Saint Olga by Mikhail Nesterov (1892)

Equal to the Apostles, Blessed Princess
- Born: c. 890–925; Pleskov or Vybuty, Kievan Rus'
- Residence: Kiev, Kievan Rus'
- Died: 11 July 969; Kiev, Kievan Rus'
- Venerated in: Eastern Orthodoxy; Catholicism
- Canonized: Unknown, possibly 1284.
- Major shrine: Church of the Tithes
- Feast: 11 July
- Attributes: Cross and church
- Patronage: Widows, converts

Princess of Kiev
- Reign: 945–957
- Predecessor: Igor of Kiev
- Successor: Sviatoslav the Brave
- Spouse: Igor of Kiev
- Issue: Sviatoslav the Brave
- Dynasty: Rurik
- Religion: Chalcedonian Christianity prev. Slavic paganism

Olga (Church Slavonic: Ольга; (Note: Belarusian: Вольга, romanized: Volha; Russian: Ольга, romanized: Olga; Ukrainian: Ольга, romanized: Olha.) Old Norse: Helga; c. 890–925 – 11 July 969) was a regent of Kievan Rus' for her son Sviatoslav from 945 until 957. Following her baptism, Olga took the name Elenа. (Note: Old East Slavic: Ѡлена, romanized: Olena.) She is known for her subjugation of the Drevlians, a tribe that had killed her husband Igor. Even though it was her grandson Vladimir who adopted Christianity and made it the state religion, she was the first Rurikid ruler to be baptized.

Olga is venerated as a saint in the Eastern Orthodox Church with the epithet "Equal to the Apostles". Her feast day is 11 July.

== Early life ==
While Olga's birthdate is unknown, it could be as early as 890 AD and as late as 925 AD. According to the Primary Chronicle, Olga was of Varangian (Viking) origin and was born in Pleskov. Little is known about her life before her marriage to Prince Igor I of Kiev and the birth of their son, Sviatoslav. According to historian Alexey Karpov, Olga was no more than 15 years old at the time of her marriage. Igor was the son and heir of Rurik, founder of the Rurik dynasty. After his father's death, Igor was under the guardianship of Oleg, who had consolidated power in the region, conquering neighboring tribes and establishing a capital in Kiev. This realm became known as Kievan Rus', a territory covering what are now parts of Russia, Ukraine, and Belarus.

The Drevlians were a neighboring tribe with which the growing Kievan Rus' empire had a complex relationship. The Drevlians had joined Kievan Rus' in military campaigns against the Byzantine Empire and paid tribute to Igor's predecessors. They stopped paying tribute upon Oleg's death and instead gave money to a local warlord. In 945, Igor set out for the Drevlian capital, Iskorosten, to force the tribe to pay tribute to Kievan Rus'. Confronted by Igor's larger army, the Drevlians backed down and paid him. As Igor and his army rode home, however, he decided the payment was not enough and returned, with only a small escort, seeking more tribute.

Upon his arrival in their territory, the Drevlians murdered Igor. According to the Byzantine chronicler Leo the Deacon, Igor's death was caused by a gruesome act of torture in which he was "captured by them, tied to tree trunks, and torn in two." Historian D. Sullivan has suggested that Leo may have invented this sensationalist version of Igor's death, taking inspiration from Diodorus Siculus' account of a similar killing method used by the robber Sinis, who lived near the Isthmus of Corinth and was killed by Theseus.

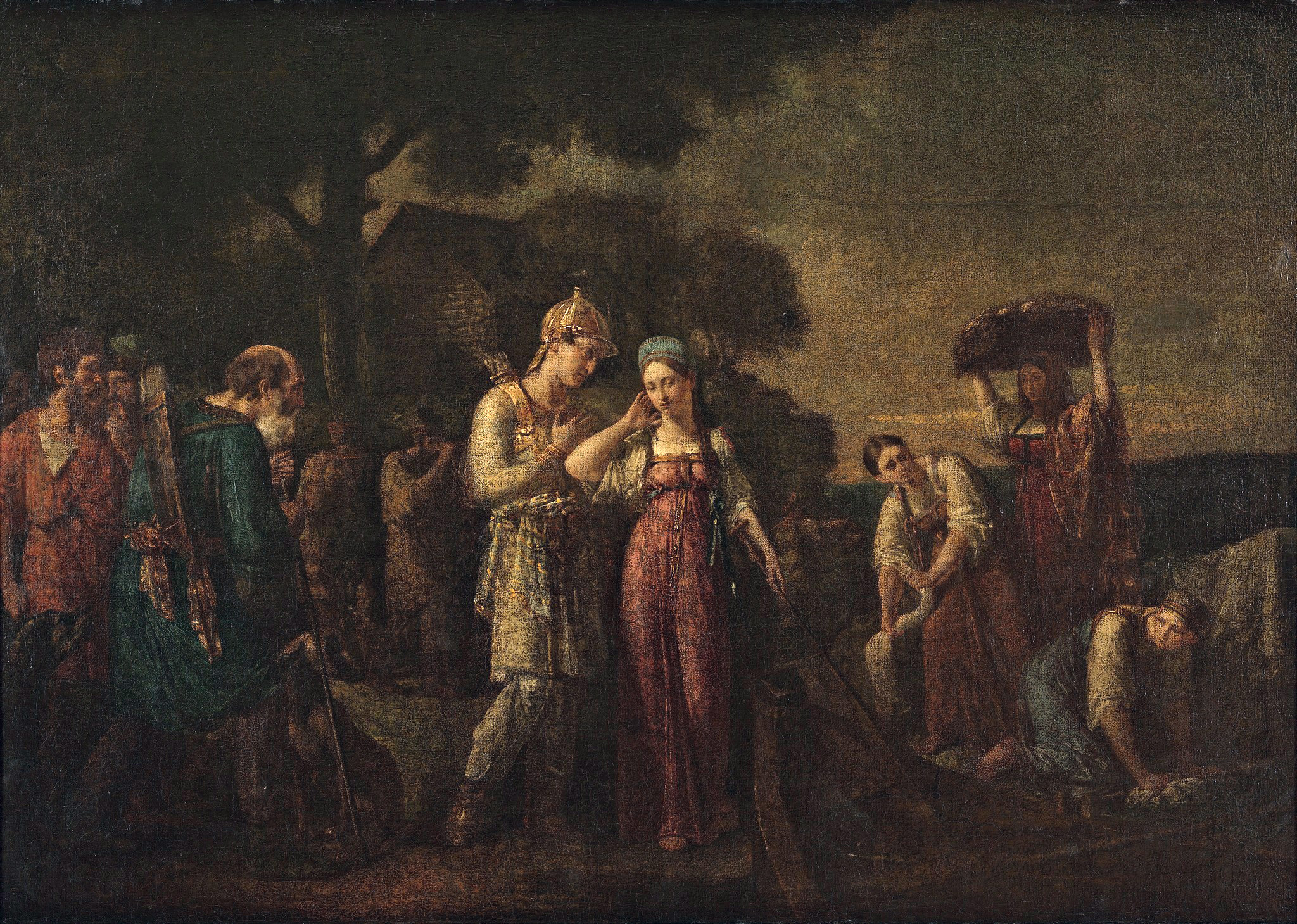
The first meeting of Prince Igor with Olga, painting by Vasily Sazonov (1824)

== Regency ==
The personal symbols of Rurik, Igor, Olga and Svyatoslav.

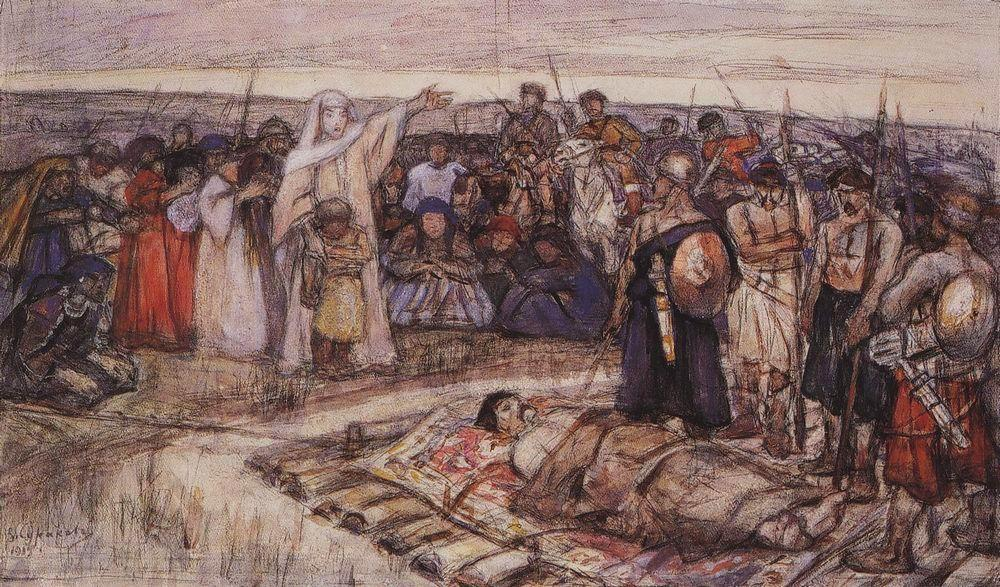
Princess Olga meets the body of her husband. A sketch by Vasily Surikov.

After Igor's death in 945, Olga ruled Kievan Rus' as regent on behalf of their son Sviatoslav. She was the first woman to rule Kievan Rus'. Little is known about Olga's tenure as ruler of Kiev, but the Primary Chronicle does give an account of her accession to the throne and her bloody revenge on the Drevlians for the murder of her husband. It also gives some insight into her role as civil leader of the Kievan people.

According to archeologist Sergei Beletsky, Knyaginya Olga, like all the other rulers before Vladimir the Great, was also using the bident as her personal symbol.

=== Drevlian Uprising ===
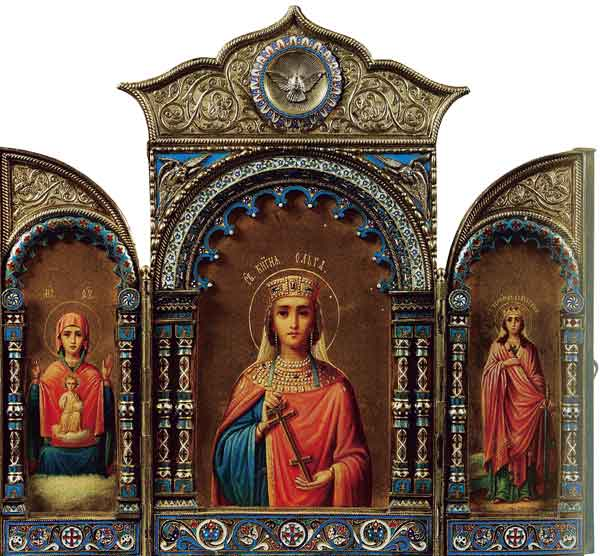
Romanov Imperial icon created in 1895 of Saint Olga. Silver, gold, color enamel, tempera. Collection V.Logvinenko

After Igor's death at the hands of the Drevlians, Olga assumed the throne because her three-year-old son Sviatoslav was too young to rule. The Drevlians, emboldened by their success in ambushing and killing the king, sent a messenger to Olga proposing that she marry his murderer, Prince Mal. Twenty Drevlian negotiators boated to Kiev to pass along their king's message and to ensure Olga's compliance. They arrived in her court and told the queen why they were in Kiev: "to report that they had slain her husband ... and that Olga should come and marry their Prince Mal." (line 6453). Olga responded:

Your proposal is pleasing to me, indeed, my husband cannot rise again from the dead. But I desire to honor you tomorrow in the presence of my people. Return now to your boat, and remain there with an aspect of arrogance. I shall send for you on the morrow, and you shall say, "We will not ride on horses nor go on foot, carry us in our boat." And you shall be carried in your boat.

When the Drevlians returned the next day, they waited outside Olga's court to receive the honor she had promised. When they repeated the words she had told them to say, the people of Kiev rose up, carrying the Drevlians in their boat. The ambassadors believed this was a great honor as if they were being carried by palanquin. The people brought them into the court, where they were dropped into a trench that had been dug the day before under Olga's orders, where the ambassadors were buried alive. It is written that Olga bent down to watch them as they were buried and "inquired whether they found the honor to their taste."

Olga then sent a message to the Drevlians that they should send "their distinguished men to her in Kiev, so that she might go to their Prince with due honor." The Drevlians, unaware of the fate of the first diplomatic party, gathered another party of men to send "the best men who governed the land of Dereva." When they arrived, Olga commanded her people to draw them a bath and invited the men to appear before her after they had bathed. When the Drevlians entered the bathhouse, Olga had it set on fire from the doors, so that all the Drevlians within burned to death.

Olga sent another message to the Drevlians, this time ordering them to "prepare great quantities of mead in the city where you killed my husband, that I may weep over his grave and hold a funeral feast for him." When Olga and a small group of attendants arrived at Igor's tomb, she did indeed weep and hold a funeral feast. The Drevlians sat down to join them and began to drink heavily. When the Drevlians were drunk, she ordered her followers to kill them, "and went about herself egging on her retinue to the massacre of the Drevlians." According to the Primary Chronicle, five thousand Drevlians were killed on this night, but Olga returned to Kiev to prepare an army to finish off the survivors.

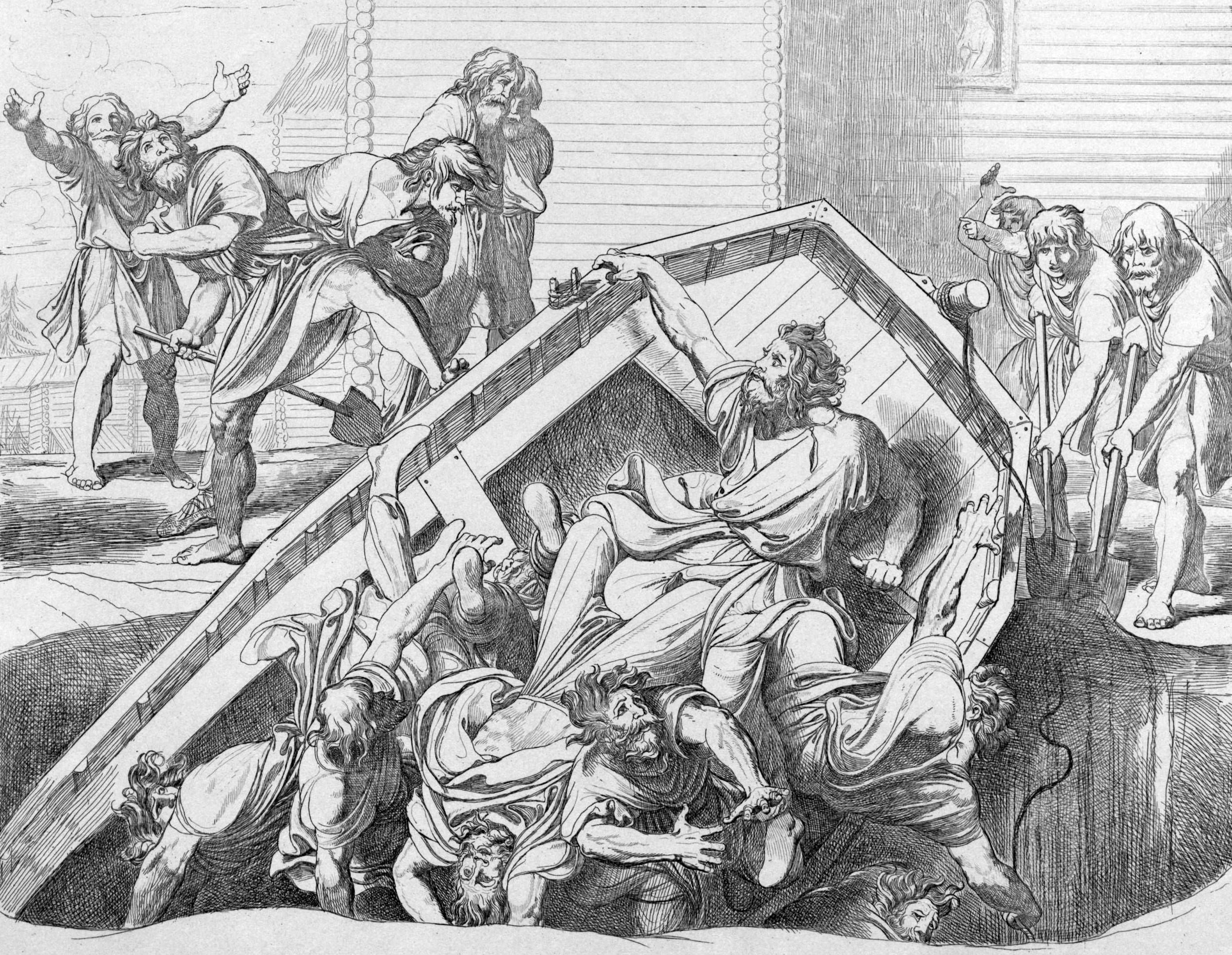
Olga's revenge on the Drevlians by Fyodor Bruni

The initial conflict between the armies of the two nations went very well for the forces of Kievan Rus', who won the battle handily and drove the survivors back into their cities. Olga then led her army to Iskorosten (what is today Korosten), the city where her husband had been slain, and laid siege to the city. The siege lasted for a year without success, when Olga thought of a plan to trick the Drevlians. She sent them a message: "Why do you persist in holding out? All your cities have surrendered to me and submitted to tribute, so that the inhabitants now cultivate their fields and their lands in peace. But you had rather die of hunger, without submitting to tribute." (line 6454).

The Drevlians responded that they would submit to tribute, but that they were afraid she was still intent on avenging her husband. Olga answered that the murder of the messengers sent to Kiev, as well as the events of the feast night, had been enough for her. She then asked them for a small request: "Give me three pigeons ... and three sparrows from each house." The Drevlians rejoiced at the prospect of the siege ending for so small a price, and did as she asked.

Olga then instructed her army to attach a piece of sulphur bound with small pieces of cloth to each bird. At nightfall, Olga told her soldiers to set the pieces aflame and release the birds. They returned to their nests within the city, which subsequently set the city ablaze. As the Primary Chronicle tells it: "There was not a house that was not consumed, and it was impossible to extinguish the flames, because all the houses caught fire at once." As the people fled the burning city, Olga ordered her soldiers to catch them, killing some of them and giving the others as slaves to her followers. She left the remnant to pay tribute.

=== Governance ===
Olga remained regent ruler of Kievan Rus' with the support of the army and her people. She changed the system of tribute gathering (poliudie) in the first legal reform recorded in Eastern Europe. Tributes were regularised under her rule. She continued to evade proposals of marriage, defended the city during the Siege of Kiev in 968, and saved the power of the throne for her son.

After her dramatic subjugation of the Drevlians, the Primary Chronicle recounts how Olga "passed through the land of Dereva, accompanied by her son and her retinue, establishing laws and tribute. Her trading posts and hunting reserves are still there." As queen, Olga established trading-posts and collected tribute along the Msta and the Luga rivers. She established hunting grounds, boundary posts, towns, and trading posts across the empire. Olga's work helped to centralize state rule with these trade centers, called pogosti, which served as administrative centers in addition to their mercantile roles. Olga's network of pogosti would prove important in the ethnic and cultural unification of the Rus' people, and her border posts began the establishment of national boundaries for the kingdom.

During her son's prolonged military campaigns, she remained in charge of Kiev, residing in the castle of Vyshgorod with her grandsons.

She set up hunting lodges where birds (probably birds of prey) were caught to be shipped to Byzantium.

== Conversion ==
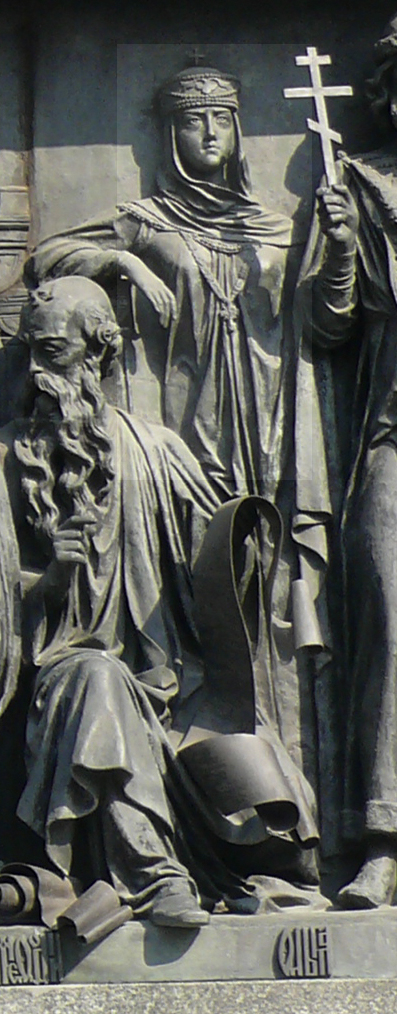
Statue of St Olga from the Millennium of Russia monument

In the 950s, Olga traveled to Constantinople, the capital of the Byzantine Empire, to visit Emperor Constantine VII. There are three primary sources about this event: a prescriptive account of formalities and etiquette in De Ceremoniis or Book of Ceremonies (c. 950s, written or commissioned by Byzantine emperor Constantine VII Porphyrogennetos in Greek), a brief passage in the Synopsis of Histories (written c. 1070s by Byzantine historian John Skylitzes in Greek), and a long adventurous story in the Primary Chronicle (compiled in Kiev c. 1110s in Old Church Slavonic by an unknown Rus' monk). All three sources disagree on why Olga went to Constantinople, when, what happened there, and how it happened.

According to the Book of Ceremonies

The Book of Ceremonies is concerned with etiquette at the Byzantine imperial court, describing all the formalities during ceremonies such as embassies, receptions and dinners, and uses various practical examples to illustrate established protocol. Olga's visit is used as an example of how to receive a Rus' prince(ss), portraying her in a positive manner. Olga's entourage consisted of various representatives of other Rus' princes, as well as 43 merchants, and one priest named Gregory. Olga's ladies-in-waiting and princesses who were her relatives were also present. There is no mention of baptism, nor of her taking on the Christian name 'Helena', in the Book of Ceremonies.

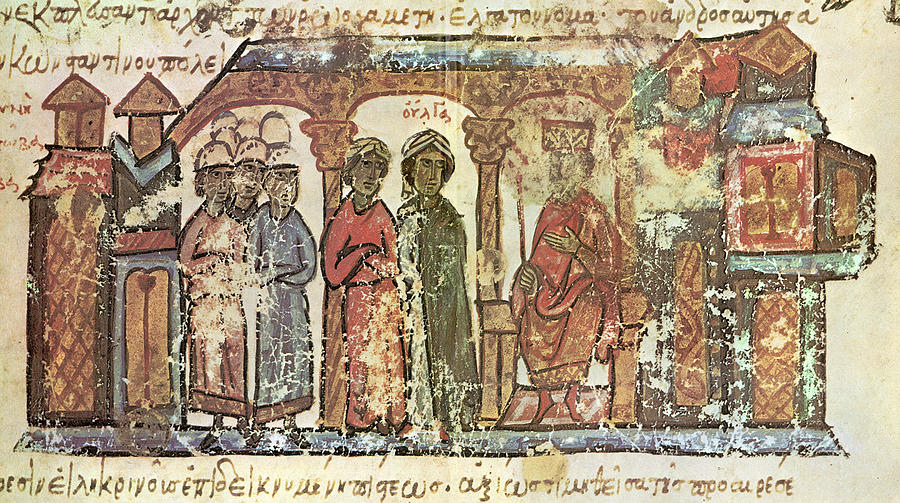
Reception by Emperor Konstantinos Porphyrogennetos of Princess Olga and her entourage - Madrid Skylitzes (12th Century)

According to John Skylitzes' Synopsis of Histories

John Skylitzes recorded only a very brief passage in chapter 11, section 6 of his Synopsis of Histories: Olga 'came to Constantinople after her husband died. She was baptized and she demonstrated fervent devotion, then she went back home.' Unlike the Book of Ceremonies, Olga is said to have been baptised in Constantinople and being devout, but not doing anything else.

According to the Primary Chronicle

Once in Constantinople, Olga converted to Christianity with the assistance of the Emperor and the Patriarch Polyeuctus. While the Primary Chronicle does not divulge Olga's motivation for her visit or conversion, it does go into great detail on the conversion process, in which she was baptized and instructed in the ways of Christianity. (Note: "The reigning Emperor was named Constantine, son of Leo. Olga came before him, and when he saw that she was very fair of countenance and wise as well, the Emperor wondered at her intellect. He conversed with her and remarked that she was worthy to reign with him in his city. When Olga heard his words, she replied that she was still a pagan, and that if he desired to baptize her, he should perform this function himself; otherwise, she was unwilling to accept baptism. The Emperor, with the assistance of the Patriarch, accordingly baptized her. When Olga was enlightened, she rejoiced in soul and body. The Patriarch, who instructed her in the faith, said to her, "Blessed art thou among the women of Rus', for thou hast loved the light, and quit the darkness. The sons of Rus' shall bless thee to the last generation of thy descendants." He taught her the doctrine of the church, and instructed her in prayer and fasting, in almsgiving, and in the maintenance of chastity. She bowed her head, and like a sponge absorbing water, she eagerly drank in his teachings. The Princess bowed before the Patriarch, saying, "Through thy prayers, Holy Father, may I be preserved from the crafts and assaults of the devil!" At her baptism she was christened Helena, after the ancient Empress, mother of Constantine the Great. The Patriarch then blessed her and dismissed her.)

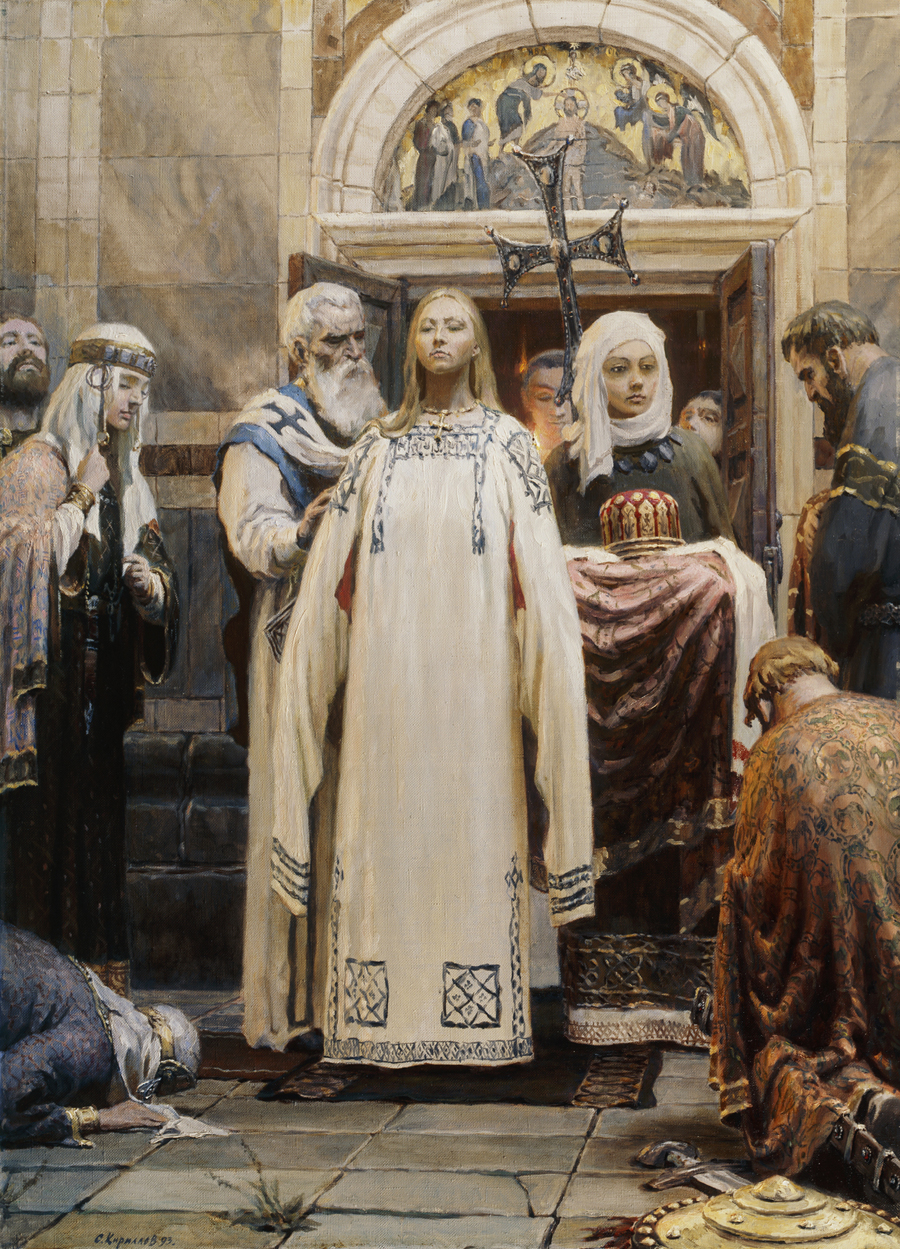
Baptism of Princess Olga - Sergei Kirillov (1993)

While the Primary Chronicle notes that Olga was christened with the name "Helena" after the ancient Saint Helena (the mother of Constantine the Great), Jonathan Shepard argues that Olga's baptismal name comes from the contemporary emperor's wife, Helena. The observation that Olga was "worthy to reign with him in his city" suggests that the emperor was interested in marrying her. While the Chronicle explains Constantine's desire to take Olga as his wife as stemming from the fact that she was "fair of countenance and wise as well," marrying Olga could certainly have helped him gain power over Rus'.

The Chronicle recounts that Olga asked the emperor to baptize her knowing that his baptismal sponsorship, by the rules of spiritual kinship, would make marriage between them a kind of spiritual incest. Though her desire to become Christian may have been genuine, this request was also a way for her to maintain political independence. After the baptism, when Constantine repeated his marriage proposal, Olga answered that she could not marry him since church law forbade a goddaughter to marry her godfather. (Note: "After her baptism, the Emperor summoned Olga and made known to her that he wished her to become his wife. But she replied, "How can you marry me, after yourself baptizing me and calling me your daughter? For among Christians that is unlawful, as you yourself must know." Then the Emperor said, "Olga, you have outwitted me." He gave her many gifts of gold, silver, silks, and various vases, and dismissed her, still calling her his daughter.")

Interpretation of the sources

Francis Butler argues that the story of the proposal was a literary embellishment, describing an event that is highly unlikely to have ever actually occurred. In fact, at the time of her baptism, Constantine already had an empress. In addition to uncertainty over the truth of the Chronicle's telling of events in Constantinople, there is controversy over the details of her conversion to Christianity. According to Church Slavonic sources, she was baptized in Constantinople in 957. Byzantine sources, however, indicate that she was a Christian prior to her 957 visit.

It seems likely that she was baptized in Kiev around 955 and, following a second christening in Constantinople, took the Christian name Helen. Olga was not the first person from Rus' to convert from her pagan ways—there were Christians in Igor's court who had taken oaths at the St. Elias Church in Kiev for the Rus'–Byzantine Treaty in 945—but she was the most powerful Rus' individual to undergo baptism during her life.

=== Efforts to Christianize Kievan Rus' ===
The Primary Chronicle reports that Olga received the Patriarch's blessing for her journey home, and that once she arrived, she unsuccessfully attempted to convert her son to Christianity:

Now Olga dwelt with her son Sviatoslav, and she urged him to be baptized, but he would not listen to her suggestion, though when any man wished to be baptized, he was not hindered, but only mocked. For to the infidels, the Christian faith is foolishness. They do not comprehend it, because they walk in darkness and do not see the glory of God. Their hearts are hardened, and they can neither hear with their ears nor see with their eyes. For Solomon has said, "The deeds of the unrighteous are far from wisdom. Inasmuch as I have called you, and ye heard me not, I sharpened my words, and ye understood not. But ye have set at nought all my counsel, and would have none of my reproach. For they have hated knowledge, and the fear of Jehovah they have not chosen. They would none of my counsel, but despised all my reproof."

This passage highlights the hostility towards Christianity in Kievan Rus' in the tenth century. In the Chronicle, Sviatoslav declares that his followers would "laugh" if he were to accept Christianity. While Olga tried to convince her son that his followers would follow his example if he converted, her efforts were in vain. However, her son agreed not to persecute those in his kingdom who did convert, which marked a crucial turning point for Christianity in the area. Despite the resistance of her people to Christianity, Olga built churches in Kiev, Pskov, and elsewhere.

=== Relations with the Holy Roman Emperor ===
Seven Latin sources document Olga's embassy to Holy Roman Emperor Otto I in 959. The continuation of Regino of Prüm mentions that the envoys requested the emperor to appoint a bishop and priests for their nation. The chronicler accuses the envoys of lies, commenting that their trick was not exposed until later. Thietmar of Merseburg says that the first archbishop of Magdeburg, Adalbert of Magdeburg, before being promoted to this high rank, was sent by Emperor Otto to the country of the Rus' (Rusciae) as a simple bishop but was expelled by pagan allies of Sviatoslav I. The same data is repeated in the annals of Quedlinburg and Hildesheim.

In 2018, Russian historian and writer Boris Akunin pointed out the importance of a 2-year gap between invitation and arrival of bishops: "The failure of Olga's Byzantine trip has inflicted a severe blow to her party. The Grand Knyaginya made a second attempt to find a Christian patron, now in the West. However, it appears that, between the embassy's dispatch to Emperor Otto in 959 and Adalbert's arrival in Kiev in 961, a bloodless coup occurred. Pagan party prevailed, the young Sviatoslav pushed his mother into the background, and that's why the German bishops had to return empty-handed."

According to Russian historian Vladimir Petrukhin, Olga invited the Roman rite bishops because she wanted to motivate Byzantine priests to catechize the Rus' people more enthusiastically, by introducing competition.

== Death ==
According to the Primary Chronicle, Olga died from illness in 969, soon after the Pechenegs' siege of the city. When Sviatoslav announced plans to move his throne to the Danube region, the ailing Olga convinced him to stay with her during her final days. Only three days later, she died and her family and larger parts of Kievan Rus' mourned:

Sviatoslav announced to his mother and his boyars, "I do not care to remain in Kiev, but should prefer to live in Peryaslavets on the Danube, since that is the centre of my realm, where all riches are concentrated; gold, silks, wine, and various fruits from Greece, silver and horses from Hungary and Bohemia, and from Rus' furs, wax, honey, and slaves." But Olga made reply, "You behold me in my weakness. Why do you desire to depart from me?" For she was already in precarious health. She thus remonstrated with him and begged him first to bury her and then to go wheresoever he would. Three days later Olga died. Her son wept for her with great mourning, as did likewise her grandsons and all the people. They thus carried her out, and buried her in her tomb. Olga had given command not to hold a funeral feast for her, for she had a priest who performed the last rites over the sainted Princess.

Although he disapproved of his mother's Christian tradition, Sviatoslav heeded Olga's request that her priest, Gregory, conduct a Christian funeral without the ritual pagan burial feast. Her tomb remained in Kiev for over two centuries, but was destroyed by the Mongolian-Tatar armies of Batu Khan in 1240. The sarcophagus found in 1826 during excavations of Church of the Tithes conducted by architect Nikolai Efimov was attributed as being Olga's and moved first to the Historical Museum and then to St. Sophia Cathedral.

== Legacy ==
=== Sainthood ===
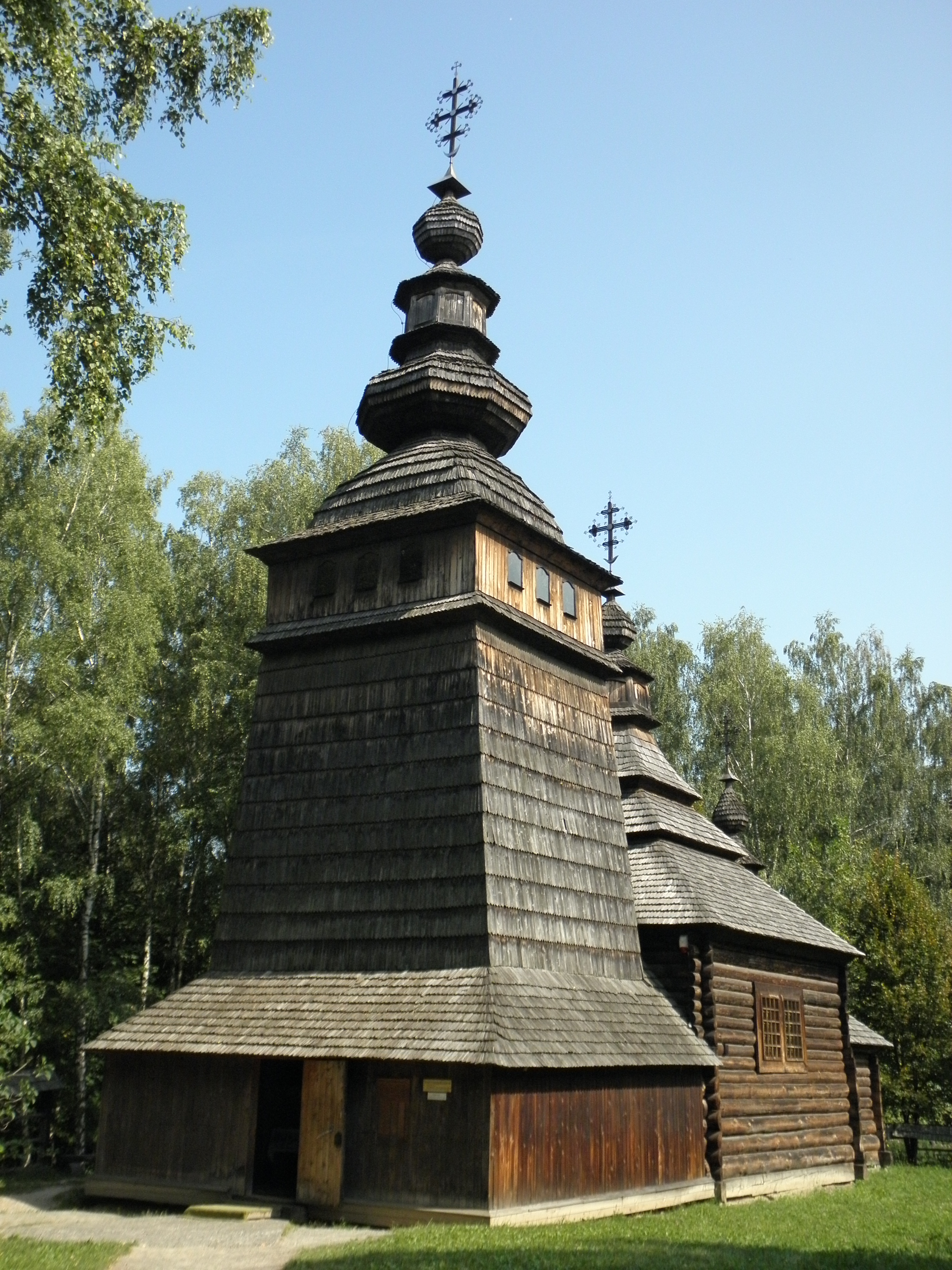
Lemko church of Saints Vladimir and Olga, modern replica at the Shevchenkivskyi Grove open-air museum in Lviv

At the time of her death, it seemed that Olga's attempt to make Kievan Rus' a Christian territory had been a failure. Nonetheless, Olga's Christianizing mission would be brought to fruition by her grandson, Vladimir, who officially adopted Christianity in 988. The Primary Chronicle highlights Olga's holiness in contrast to the pagans around her during her life as well as the significance of her decision to convert to Christianity:

Olga was the precursor of the Christian land, even as the day-spring precedes the sun and as the dawn precedes the day. For she shone like the moon by night, and she was radiant among the infidels like a pearl in the mire, since the people were soiled, and not yet purified of their sin by holy baptism. But she herself was cleansed by this sacred purification .... She was the first from Rus' to enter the kingdom of God, and the sons of Rus' thus praise her as their leader, for since her death she has interceded with God in their behalf.

It is unclear when Olga was canonized, but John Fennell argued that this was most likely in 1284, together with Vladimir, when Metropolitan Maxim summoned the bishops to a council, and was recorded the next year visiting "all the Russian land (i.e. Suzdalia, northeast Russia), teaching, instructing and administering," and spreading news about their canonization, including in Novgorod and Pskov. A northern Russian manuscript from the 15th century mentions that "when Vladimir unearthed the body of Olga, his grandmother [and discovered that it was] uncorrupted, [he then] placed it in a wooden coffin in the Church of the Tithe". In 1547, nearly 600 years after her 969 death, the Russian Orthodox Church officially named Olga a saint, equal-to-the-apostles.

Because of her proselytizing influence, the Eastern Orthodox Church, the Ruthenian Greek Catholic Church, and the Ukrainian Greek Catholic Church call Olga by the honorific Isapóstolos, "Equal to the Apostles". Olga's feast day is July 11, the date of her death. The Orthodox Church of Ukraine celebrates her memory on 24 July. In keeping with her own biography, she is the patron of widows and converts.

Olga is venerated as a saint in East Slavic-speaking countries where churches use the Byzantine Rite: Eastern Orthodox Church (especially in the Russian Orthodox Church), Greek Catholic Church (especially in the Ukrainian Greek Catholic Church), in churches with Byzantine Rite Lutheranism, and among Western Catholics in Russia.

=== Feast Day ===
- 11 July – main commemoration (death anniversary),

==== Fixed Feast Day (Synaxes) ====
- 25 May – Synaxis of Saints of Volhynia (ROCOR and Greek Orthodox Church),
- 15 July – Synaxis of All Saints of Kiev (ROC),
- 10 October – Synaxis of Saints of Volhynia (ROC),

==== Moveable Feast Day (Synaxes) ====
- Synaxis of Saints of Pskov – movable holiday on the 3rd Sunday of Pentecost,

=== Churches and monuments ===
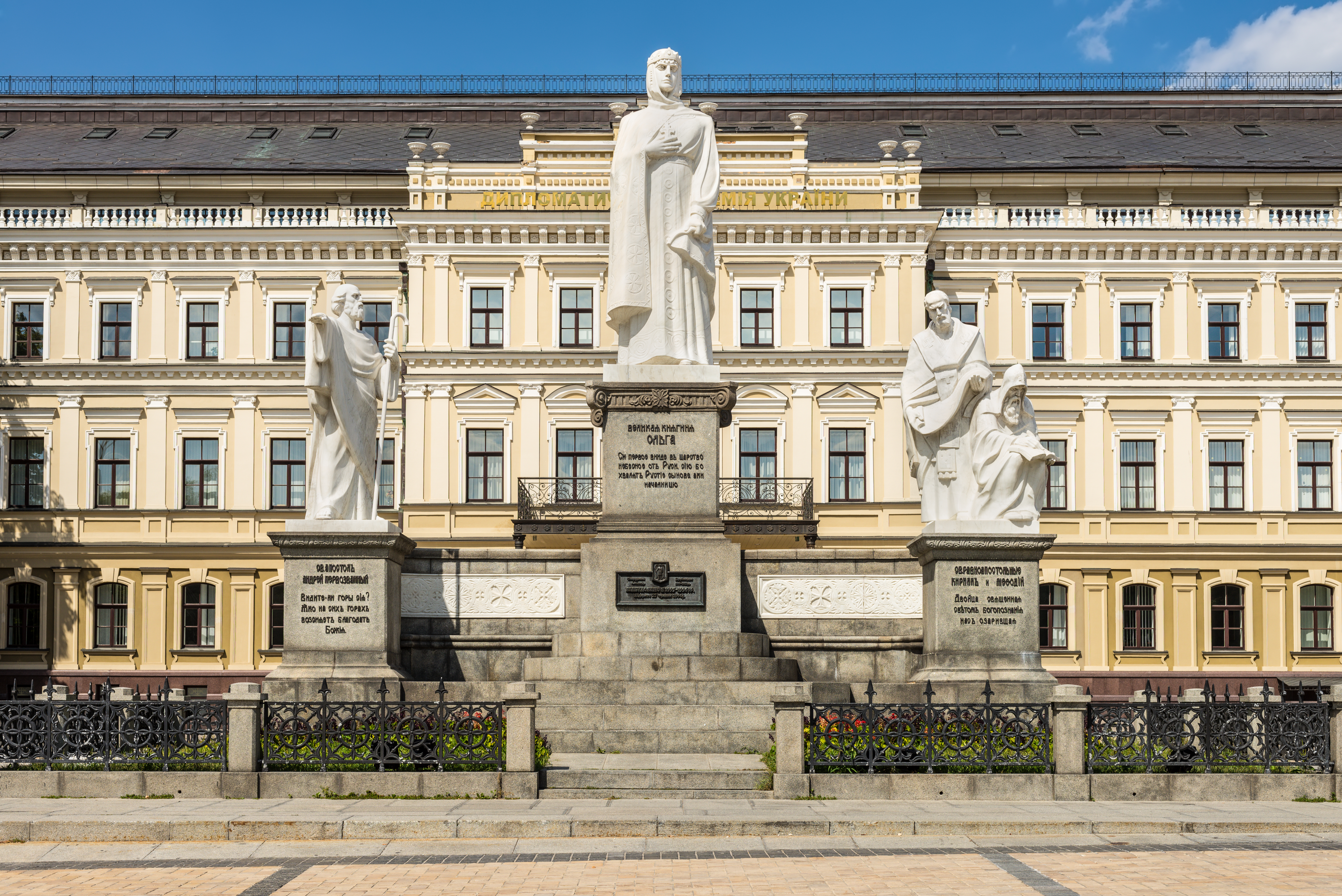
Monument to Princess Olga, Saint Apostle Andrew the First-Called and enlighteners Cyril and Methodius, Kiev

Ukraine

- Cathedral of St. Olha, Kiev (inaugurated 2010)
- Monument to Princess Olga, Saint Apostle Andrew the First-Called and enlighteners Cyril and Methodius, Kiev
- Church of Sts. Olha and Elizabeth, Lviv
- Church of Volodymyr and Olha, Khodoriv
- Church of Sts. Volodymyr and Olha, Podusiv, Lviv Raion, Lviv Oblast
- Saint Volodymyr and Olha church, Staryi Dobrotvir, Chervonohrad Raion, Lviv Oblast
- Church of Saints Volodymyr and Olha, Birky, Yavoriv Raion, Lviv Oblast
- Church of Saints Volodymyr and Olha, Horodok, Lviv Oblast
- Saint Olga Orthodox church in Korosten, Zhytomyr Oblast

Russia

- Monument of St. Olga by Vyacheslav Klykov, Pskov (2003).
- Monument of St. Olga by Zurab Tsereteli, Pskov (2003).
- Olga bridge in Pskov.
- St. Olga's chapel in Pskov.
- Princess Olga Airport in Pskov (since 2019, through a win in a poll against Aleksandr Nevsky).
- Monument of St. Olga in Vladimir.
- Monument of St. Olga in Moscow.
- St. Olga is present on the Millennium of Russia monument in Veliky Novgorod.
- St. Olga Roman Catholic Cathedral in Lyublino, Moscow (inaugurated 2003).
- St. Olga Equal-to-apostles Russian Orthodox Cathedral in Ostankino, Moscow (inaugurated 2014).
- St. Olga Equal-to-apostles Russian Orthodox Cathedral in Solntsevo, Moscow (inaugurated 2015).
- St. Olga Equal-to-apostles Russian Orthodox Cathedral in Olga, Primorje.

United States

- Sts. Volodymyr and Olha Ukrainian Catholic Church, Chicago

Canada

- Saints Vladimir and Olga Ukrainian Catholic Cathedral and Parish Hall, Winnipeg, Manitoba
- Saints Vladimir and Olga Ukrainian Catholic Church, Dauphin, Manitoba
- Saints Vladimir and Olga Ukrainian Catholic Church, Windsor, Ontario

Australia

- Saints Volodymyr and Olha Church, Woodville, South Australia

=== Modern reception ===
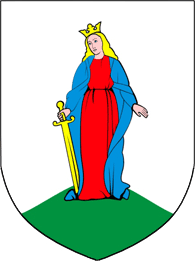
Image of Saint Olga on a seal of Lyachchyzy village in Belarus. The sword is commonly included in Olga's modern iconography linking her to the female bogatyr image.

Scholarship has traditionally focused on Olga's role in the spread of Christianity to Eastern Europe and Russia as well as her role in advising her son against persecution of Christians in the Kievan Rus'.

Modern publications, on the other hand, reflect a broader interest in Olga beyond her role in expanding Christendom. Detailing her story, a 2018 article claimed she showed her countrymen how "a woman could rule with strength and decision." The Russian Primary Chronicle's claim that Olga was of Viking descent also received attention for its possible contribution to her "warrior spirit".

Russian historian Boris Akunin argues though she certainly reconquered the Drevlians, only her killing of their first envoy is plausible, since Iskorosten was just two days' ride from Kiev, making it difficult to conceal the first public murder.

=== Arts and literature ===
In 1981 a new ballet based on Olga's life was composed to commemorate the 1500th anniversary of the city of Kiev.

=== Toponyms ===
In most cities of Ukraine, there is a Knyahini Olha Street. There is an Olhynska Street in the city of Kyiv.

Cleveland has Saint Olga Ave. There is also St. Olga Street in the city of Hamilton (Canada).

== Gallery ==
Illuminations from the Radziwiłł Chronicle

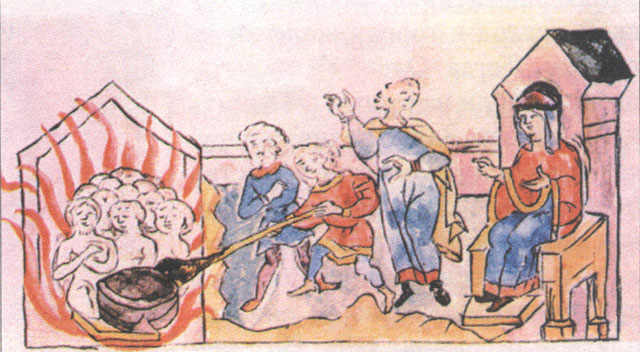
Olga's revenge for her husband's death

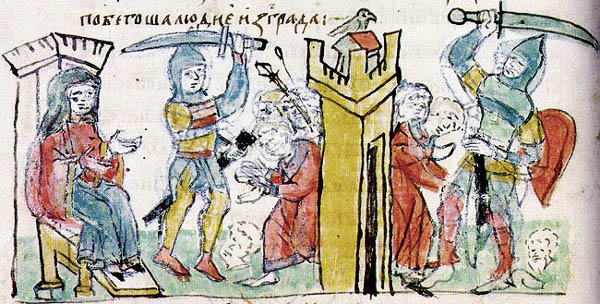
Fourth revenge of Olga: Burning of Derevlian capital Iskorosten

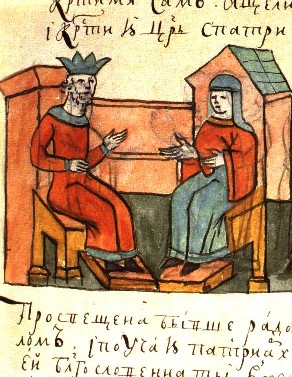
Reception of Olga by Constantine VII
Portraits

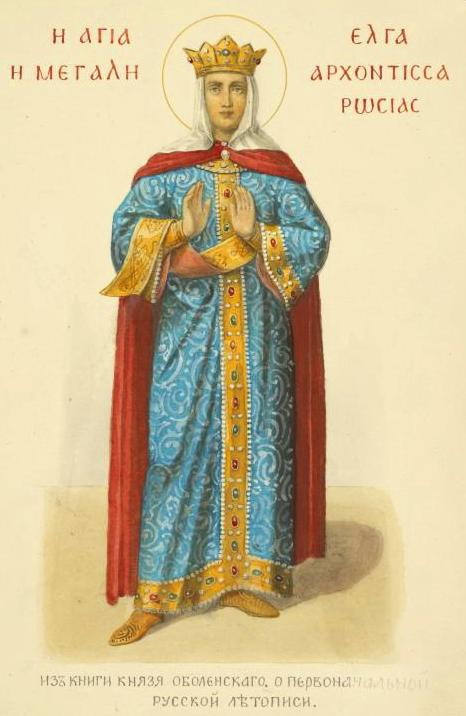
Kievan Rus ruler Olga (1869)

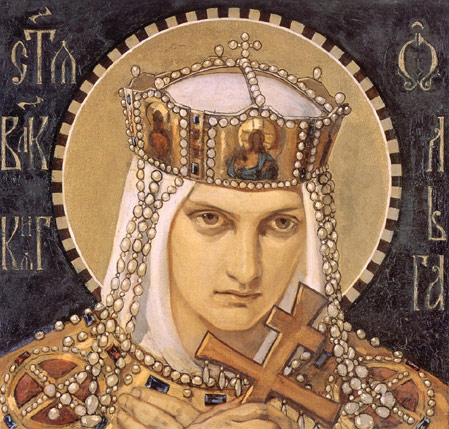
Nikolai Bruni's Saint Grand Princess Olga (1901)

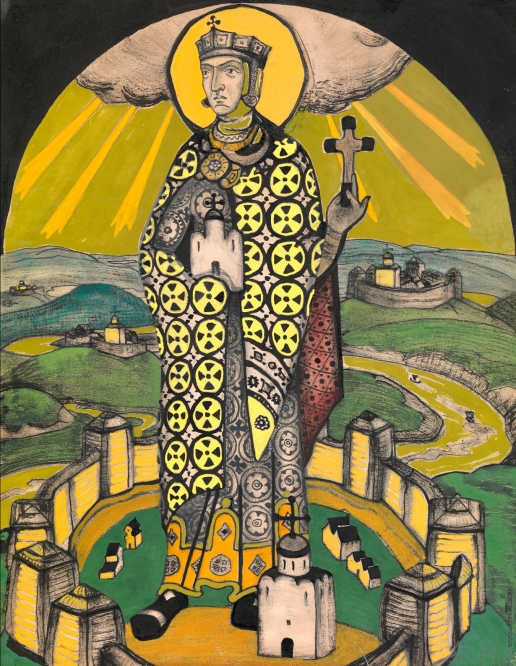
Nicholas Roerich's Saint Olga (1915)

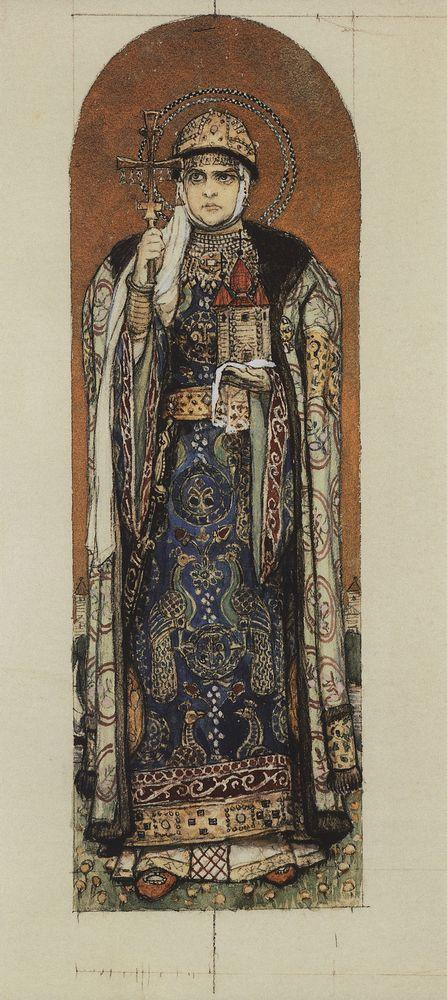
Sketch for Saint Olga by Viktor Vasnetsov (1885-93)

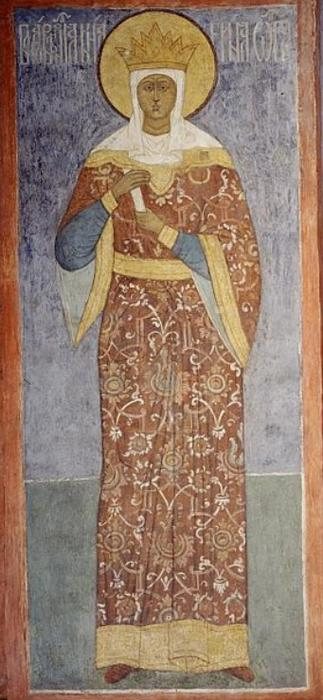
Fresco of Saint Olga at the Archangel Cathedral in Moscow.

== See also ==
- Princess Olga Pskov Airport
- Order of Princess Olga (established in Ukraine in 1997)
- Olga Bay and Olga, Russia
- Christianization of Kievan Rus'
- A Perfect Absolution – concept album by French band Gorod about Olga of Kiev

== Bibliography ==
=== Primary sources ===
Old Church Slavonic

- Primary Chronicle (c. 1110s).
  - Izbornyk (1928). Лђтопись По Лаврентьевскому Списку (видання 1926—1928 років) [The Chronicle according to the Laurentian Codex (1926–1928 edition)]. Complete Collection of Russian Chronicles (PSRL). Volume 2. 2nd Edition. Leningrad: Nauka. p. 579.
    - Cross, Samuel Hazzard; Sherbowitz-Wetzor, Olgerd P. (1953) [1930]. The Russian Primary Chronicle, Laurentian Text. Translated and edited by Samuel Hazzard Cross and Olgerd P. Sherbowitz-Wetzor (PDF). Cambridge, Massachusetts: The Mediaeval Academy of America. p. 325. (The first 50 pages are a scholarly introduction).
  - Izbornyk (1908). Лѣтопись По Ипатьевскому Списку (видання 1908 року) [The Chronicle according to the Hypatian Codex (1908 edition)]. Complete Collection of Russian Chronicles (PSRL). Volume 2. 3rd Edition. Saint Petersburg: Typography of Edward Prats. p. 938.

Greek

- De Ceremoniis (c. 950s), written or commissioned by Byzantine emperor Constantine VII Porphyrogennetos.
- John Skylitzes, Synopsis of Histories (c. 1070s).

Latin

- Adalberti continuato Reginonis, continuation of Regino of Prüm's Chronicon (c. 970).

=== Literature ===
- Craughwell, Thomas J. (2006). Saints Behaving Badly: The Cutthroats, Crooks, Trollops, Con Men, and Devil-Worshippers Who Became Saints. Doubleday (imprint of Random House). ISBN 978-0-385-51997-7.
- Gasparov, Boris; Raevsky-Hughes, Olga (1993). California Slavic Studies. Vol. XVI: Slavic Culture in the Middle Ages. University of California Press. p. 81. ISBN 978-0-520-07945-8.
  - Gasparov, Boris; Raevsky-Hughes, Olga (2018) [1993]. Christianity and the Eastern Slavs, Volume I: Slavic Cultures in the Middle Ages. University of California Press. p. 374.
  - Gasparov, Boris; Raevsky-Hughes, Olga (2021) [1993]. California Slavic Studies. Vol. XVI: Slavic Culture in the Middle Ages. University of California Press. p. 394. ISBN 978-0-520-30918-0.
- Historical Dictionary of Ukraine. By Z. Kohut, B.Nebesio, M. Yurkevich. The Scarecrow Press, Inc. Lanham, Maryland. Toronto. Oxford. 2005.
- Plokhy, Serhii, The Gates of Europe. A History of Ukraine. New York: Basic Books, 2015.
- Raffensperger, Christian; Ostrowski, Donald (2023). The Ruling Families of Rus: Clan, Family and Kingdom. London: Reaktion Books. p. 309. ISBN 978-1-78914-745-2. (e-book)
- Vernadsky, George (1948). A History of Russia. Vol. II: Kievan Russia. Yale University Press. ISBN 0-300-01647-6.

| Preceded by Igor of Kiev | Princess of Kiev as Regent; 945–960s | Succeeded by Sviatoslav the Brave |
