= Obshchestvovedeniye =

Soviet social science and academic subject

Obshestvovédeny or Obshchestvovédeniye (Russian: Обществоведение) is a social science and eponymous academic subject in a Soviet school. As a subject, it was taught from the 1960s to 1991 throughout the USSR and covered all the three constituent parts of Marxism–Leninism. These component parts of Marxism, according to Lenin and his Soviet adherents, are Marxist-Leninist philosophy (dialectical and historical materialism), political economy, and scientific communism.

== Overview ==
=== Soviet Union ===
For the first time the school program was approved by the People's Commissariat for Education in 1925. The peculiarity of the subject was to develop a system of views on the world among students of secondary schools, covering all the phenomena occurring in it and giving students a unified understanding and explanation of these phenomena through the prism of Marxist-Leninist philosophy (In other words, the subject was also a complex of social Sciences, but from a Marxist point of view). In the USSR education system, social studies was a mandatory course for all senior-class secondary-school students and represented the world as Soviet officials wanted their young people to see and understand it. In order to indoctrinate students about Communism, the course contained "much distortion, half-truth, and deliberate falsification." The Soviet textbook of social studies included:

1. Dialectical and historical materialism — the basis of the scientific worldview.
2. Socialism — the first phase of Communist society.
3. The Communist party — the leading and guiding force of Soviet society.
4. Ways of gradual development of socialism into communism.
5. XX century — the century of the triumph of communism.

=== Russia ===
After the collapse of the Soviet Union in the Russian school and CIS schools since 1992 the subject was canceled. The factual information previously contained in the subject began to be taught within the framework of history.

Since 2000, the subject has been returned to secondary school as a complex of Sciences, including: philosophy, sociology, social psychology, law, economics and political science.

As an independent educational subject has been preserved in Belarus.

== See also ==
- Citizenship education

== Bibliography ==
Articles

- Tamara Graczykowska. (1999). "Słownictwo pola semantycznego "Edukacja i wychowanie" w moskiewskiej gazecie "Trybuna Radziecka" z lat 1927–1938" (PDF). Acta Polono-Ruthenica (in Polish). Stuttgart. ISSN 1427-549X.
- Wojciech Siegień (2016). Naprzód ku przeszłości! Nauczanie historii a zmiany ideologii państwowej w Rosji na początku XXI wieku. Forum Oświatowe, 28 (2), 185–202.
- Yevgeny Bukhtoyarov (2015). The emergence of Obshestvovedeny (in Russian). (15.08.2015)

Books

- O. B. Soboleva. (2020). Методика обучения обществознанию : учебник и практикум для вузов (PDF) (in Russian). Moscow: Юрайт. ISBN 978-5-534-09466-4. Archived from the original (PDF) on 2020-10-21.
