= Philosophical Inquiries =

- Discipline: Philosophy
- Language: English
- Edited by: Alessandro Pagnini

Publication details
- History: 2013–present
- Publisher: Edizioni ETS (Italy)
- Frequency: Biannual
- Impact factor: 0.2 (2022)

Standard abbreviations
- ISO 4: Philos. Inq.

Indexing
- ISSN: 2281-8618 (print); 2282-0248 (web)

Philosophical Inquiries is a biannual peer-reviewed academic journal. It is an Italian philosophical journal published in English. Its aim is to cover a wide range of philosophical questions of broad interest and belonging to diverse fields, such as epistemology, ethics, metaphysics, aesthetics, philosophy of mind, philosophy of science, and philosophy of law. It is edited by Alessandro Pagnini. According to the Journal Citation Reports, the journal has a 2022 impact factor of 0.2.

== Abstracting and indexing ==
The journal is abstracted and indexed in the Emerging Sources Citation Index, Scopus, and the Philosopher's Index.
