= Maria Carla Galavotti =

Italian philosopher of science

Maria Carla Galavotti (born 1947) is a retired Italian philosopher of science, an emeritus professor at the University of Bologna. She specializes in the philosophy of probability and causality. Particular concerns of her work have included subjectivist Bayesianism, according to which probability describes a personal belief, the origins of subjectivism in the works of Frank Ramsey and Bruno de Finetti, and the use of probability to describe causal relationships.

== Education and career ==
Galavotti began working at the University of Bologna as a researcher in philosophy in 1975. She became an associate professor there from 1982 until 1994, when she moved to a full professorship at the University of Trieste. She returned to the University of Bologna as a full professor in 1998, and retired to become a professor emeritus in 2019.

== Recognition ==
Galavotti was elected to the German National Academy of Sciences Leopoldina in 2014.

== Books ==
Galavotti is the author of books including:

- Metodologia statistica per la ricerca geostorica (La Nuova Italia Editrice, 1979)
- Probabilità (La Nuova Italia Scientifica, 2000)
- Philosophical Introduction to Probability (CSLI Publications, 2005)
- La spiegazione scientifica (with Raffaela Campaner, Archetipolibri, 2012)
- Filosofia della scienza (with Raffaela Campaner, Egea, 2017)

Her edited books include:

- Epistemologia ed economia (with Guido Gambetta, Clueb, 1988)
- Frank Plumpton Ramsey's Notes on Philosophy, Probability and Mathematics (Bibliopolis, 1991)
- Probability, Dynamics and Causality: Essays in Honour of Richard C. Jeffrey (with Domenico Costantini, Academic Publishers, 1997)
- Experience, Reality, and Scientific Explanation: Essays in Honour of Merrilee and Wesley Salmon (with Alessandro Pagnini, Kluwer, 1999)
- Stochastic Causality (with Patrick Suppes and Domenico Costantini, University of Chicago Press, 2001)
- Cambridge and Vienna: Frank P. Ramsey and the Vienna Circle. (Vienna Circle Institute Yearbook v.12., Springer, 2006)
- European Philosophy of Science: Philosophy of Science in Europe and the Viennese Heritage (with Elisabeth Nemeth and Friedrich Stadler, Springer, 2014)
