= History of Kyiv (1811–1917) =

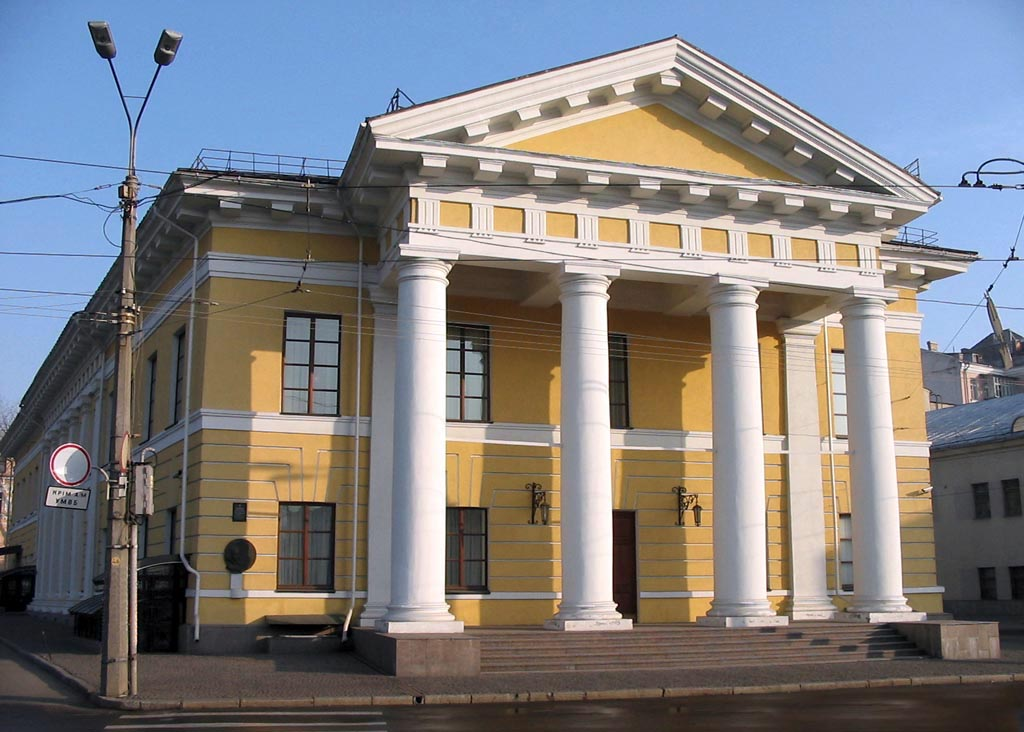
The Contracts House, rebuilt in 1815–1817 under supervision of Andrey Melensky, is one of the hallmarks of Kyiv (then Kiev) as was reconstructed following the 1811 Great Fire of Podil.

The history of Kyiv from the 1811 Great Fire of Podil until the Kiev November uprising (1917), causing the outbreak of the Ukrainian War of Independence (1917–1921), encompasses most of the 19th century until the collapse of the Russian Empire during the First World War. (Note: Serhiy Bilenky (2018) used the term imperial Kyiv for the city during the long nineteenth century.) The city of Kiev (now Kyiv) was fundamentally reconstructed, and then underwent significant Russification due to various demographical developments, as well as cultural and social-economic policies of the local, regional and Imperial administrations. Simultaneously, it became a symbol of the Ukrainian National Revival and a centre of emerging Ukrainian nationalism (although here it competed with Lviv in Austrian Galicia), which resulted in Kyiv becoming the capital city of the revolutionary Ukrainian People's Republic and its Central Rada in 1917.

== Great Fire of Podil (1811) ==
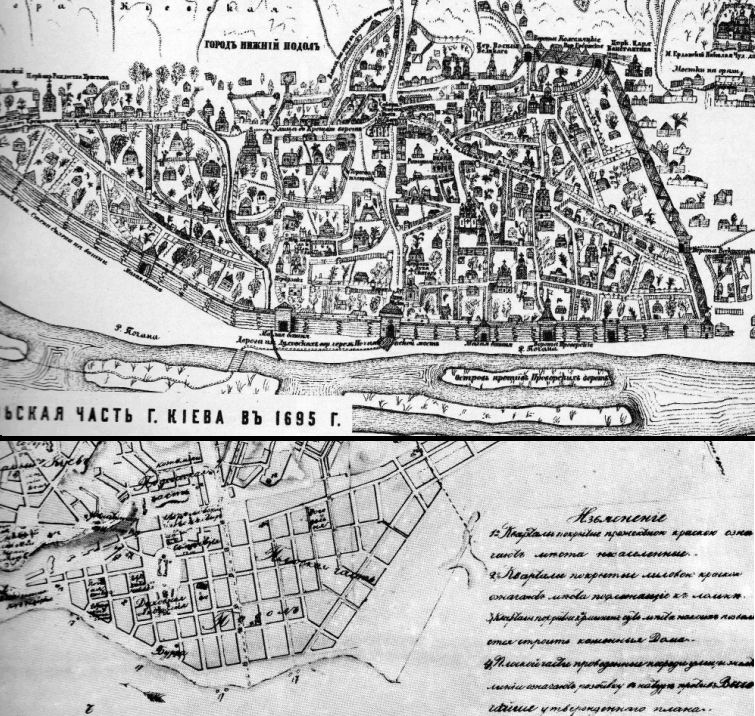
Comparison of Podil's urban planning before (top, 1695) and after the fire (bottom, 1853)

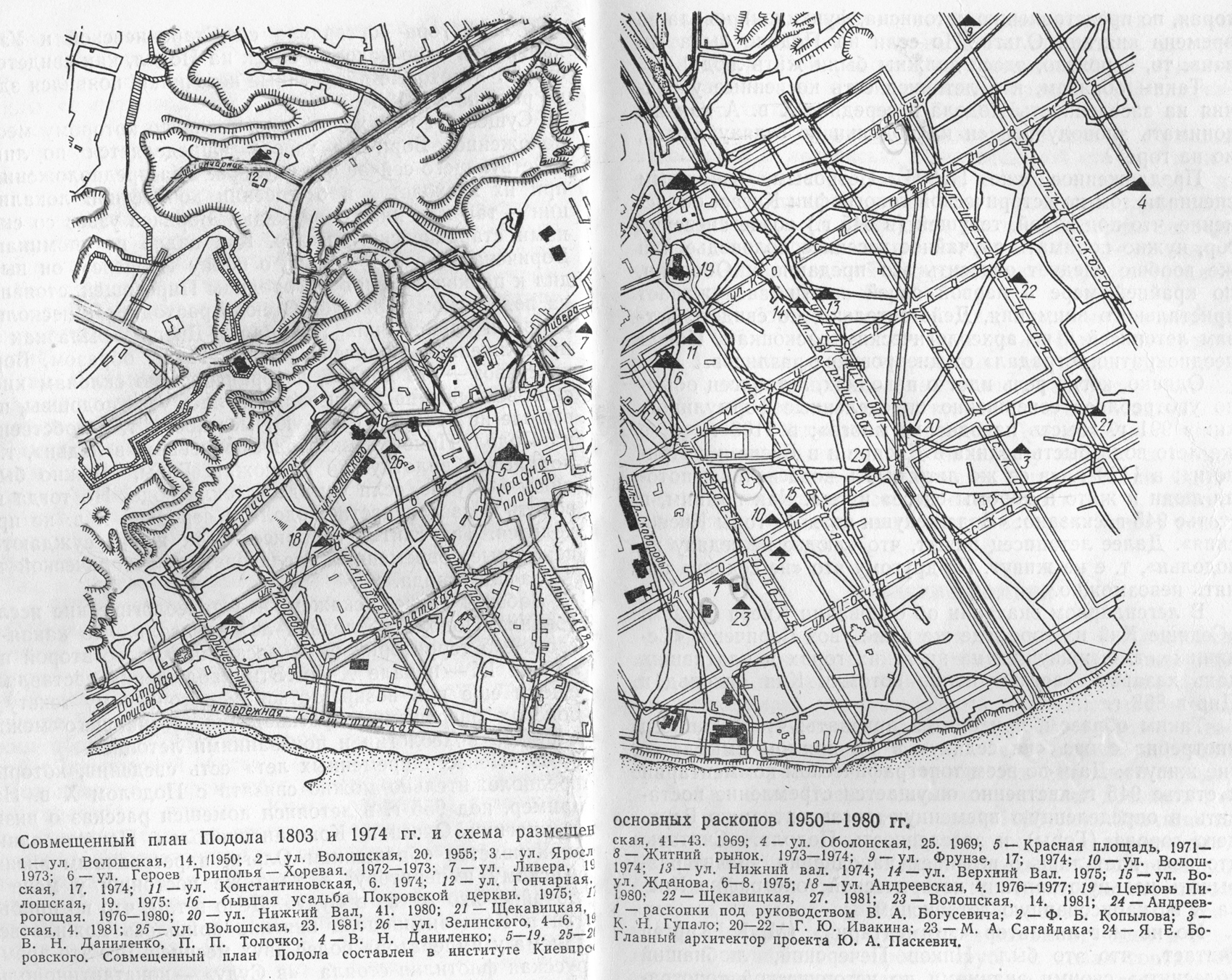
Combined map of Podil 1804 and 1974. From the "Podil in ancient Kiev" book authored by K.N.Hupalo

The 1811 Great Fire of Podil (Ukrainian: Велика пожежа, Velyka pozhezha) occurred on the morning of 9 July 1811 in the historical and commercial neighborhood of Podil in Kiev (Kyiv), the capital of Ukraine. The fire lasted for three days and almost destroyed the whole neighborhood. Before the fire, Podil was the city's most densely populated neighborhood; out of 3,672 households in the city, 2,068 were located in the Podil.

It was speculated that the fire was set by French spies or by their local collaborators on the eve of the French invasion of Russia.

The fire's power was strengthened with high winds and the season's severe droughts, from which even the nearby Dnieper River was reported to have been dried out. The city's official version of events regarding the cause of the fire, however, was said to be children playing with fire.

More than 2,000 homes, magistrate buildings, 12 churches, and 3 monasteries were destroyed in the fire. However, some buildings were spared destruction, including the House of Peter I. Smoke from the fire was reported to have been seen more than 130 km (81 mi) away. In response to the fire, the Director of the Kiev Myshkovsky Gymnasium No. 3 stated:

[that it's the] third since the historic city's foundation, and the first since the times of Batyi [Khan].

— Makarov, p. 368

In 1812, a new plan for the reconstruction of Podil was drawn up by architects Geste and Melensky. The plan had redrawn the neighborhood's curved streets into straightaways, thus creating the square city blocks that exist to this day. The fire showed the vulnerability of the city's wooden buildings, some of which would later be reconstructed in stone. Reconstruction after the fire brought about the construction of many architectural landmarks currently standing, including the Contracts House and Gostnyi Dvir, among many others.

Nevertheless, some streets remained in the shape they were in before the fire. These are Borychiv Tik, Pokrovska, Pritisko-Mykilska, per.Khoryva.

== Urban development ==
In 1834, St. Vladimir University was established in the city (now known as Taras Shevchenko National University of Kyiv). The Ukrainian poet Taras Shevchenko cooperated with its geography department as a field researcher and editor. The Magdeburg Law existed in Kyiv till that year, when it was abolished by the Decree of Tsar Nicholas I of Russia on 23 December 1834.

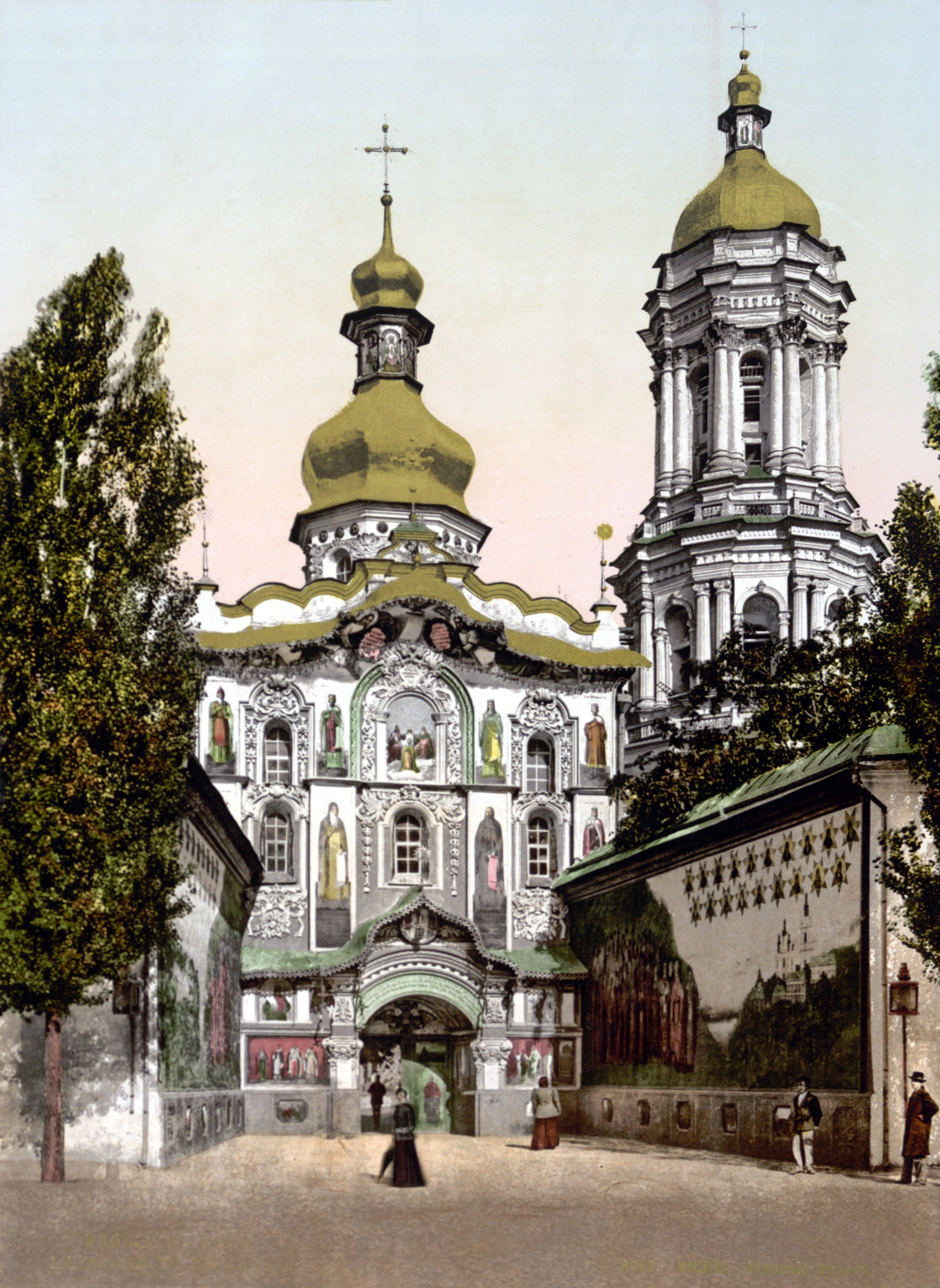
The gates to the Monastery of the Caves in the 1890s.

Even after Kyiv and the surrounding region ceased being a part of Poland, Poles continued to play an important role. In 1812 there were over 43,000 Polish noblemen in Kyiv province, compared to only approximately 1,000 Russian nobles. Typically the nobles spent their winters in the city, where they held Polish balls and fairs. Until the mid-18th century Kyiv preserved the domination of Polish culture, although Poles made up no more than ten percent of the city's population and 25% of its voters. During the 1830s Polish was the language of Kyiv's educational system, and until Polish enrollment in the university of St. Vladimir was restricted in the 1860s Poles made up the majority of that school's student body. The Russian government's cancellation of the city's autonomy and its placement under the rule of bureaucrats appointed from St. Petersburg was largely motivated by fear of Polish insurrection in the city. Warsaw factories and fine Warsaw shops had branches in Kyiv. Józef Zawadzki, founder of Kyiv's stock exchange, served as the city's mayor in the 1890s. Poles living in the city tended to be friendly towards the Ukrainian national movement, and some took part in Ukrainian organisations. Indeed, many of the poorer Polish nobles became Ukrainianised in language and culture, and these Ukrainians of Polish descent constituted an important element of the growing Ukrainian national movement. Kyiv served as a meeting point where such activists came together with the pro-Ukrainian descendants of Cossack officers from the left bank. Many of them would leave the city for the surrounding countryside in order to try to spread Ukrainian ideas among the peasants.

Historical population
| Year | Pop. | ±% |
|---|---|---|
| 1797 | 19,000 | — |
| 1835 | 36,500 | +92.1% |
| 1845 | 50,000 | +37.0% |
| 1856 | 56,000 | +12.0% |
| 1865 | 71,300 | +27.3% |
| 1874 | 127,500 | +78.8% |
| 1884 | 154,500 | +21.2% |
| 1897 | 247,700 | +60.3% |
| 1905 | 450,000 | +81.7% |
| 1909 | 468,000 | +4.0% |
| 1912 | 442,000 | −5.6% |
| 1914 | 626,300 | +41.7% |
| 1917 | 430,500 | −31.3% |
| 1919 | 544,000 | +26.4% |
On 1 January of specified year.

According to the Russian census of 1874, of 127,251 people living in Kyiv, 38,553 (39%) spoke "Little Russian" (the Ukrainian language), 12,917 (11%) spoke Yiddish, 9,736 (10%) spoke Great Russian, 7,863 (6%) spoke Polish, and 2,583 (2%) spoke German. 48,437 (or 49%) of the city's residents were listed as speaking "generally Russian speech (obshcherusskoe narechie)." Such people were typically Ukrainians and Poles who could speak enough Russian to be counted as Russian-speaking.

From the late 18th century until the late 19th century, city life was increasingly dominated by Russian military and ecclesiastical concerns. Russian Orthodox Church institutions formed a significant part of the city's infrastructure and business activity at that time. In the winter 1845–1846, the historian Mykola Kostomarov founded a secret political society, the Brotherhood of Saints Cyril and Methodius, whose members put forward the idea of a federation of free Slavic people with Ukrainians as a distinct group among them rather than a part of the Russian nation. The Brotherhood's ideology was a synthesis of programmes of three movements: Ukrainian autonomists, Polish democrats, and Russian Decembrists in Ukraine. The society was quickly suppressed by the Tsarist authorities in March–April 1847. The Monument to Prince Volodymyr was erected on Volodymyrska Hill in 1853. Municipal self-government was reintroduced in 1871.

Following the gradual loss of Ukraine's autonomy and suppression of the local Ukrainian and Polish cultures, Kyiv experienced growing Russification in the 19th century by means of Russian migration, administrative actions (such as the Valuev Circular of 1863), and social modernisation. At the beginning of the 20th century, the city was dominated by Russian-speaking population, while the lower classes retained Ukrainian folk culture to a significant extent. According to the census of 1897, of the city's approximately 240,000 people approximately 56% of the population spoke the Russian language, 23% spoke the Ukrainian language, 12.5% spoke Yiddish, 7% spoke Polish and 1% spoke the Belarusian language. Despite the Russian cultural dominance in the city, enthusiasts among ethnic Ukrainian nobles, military and merchants made recurrent attempts to preserve native culture in the city (by clandestine book-printing, amateur theatre, folk studies etc.).

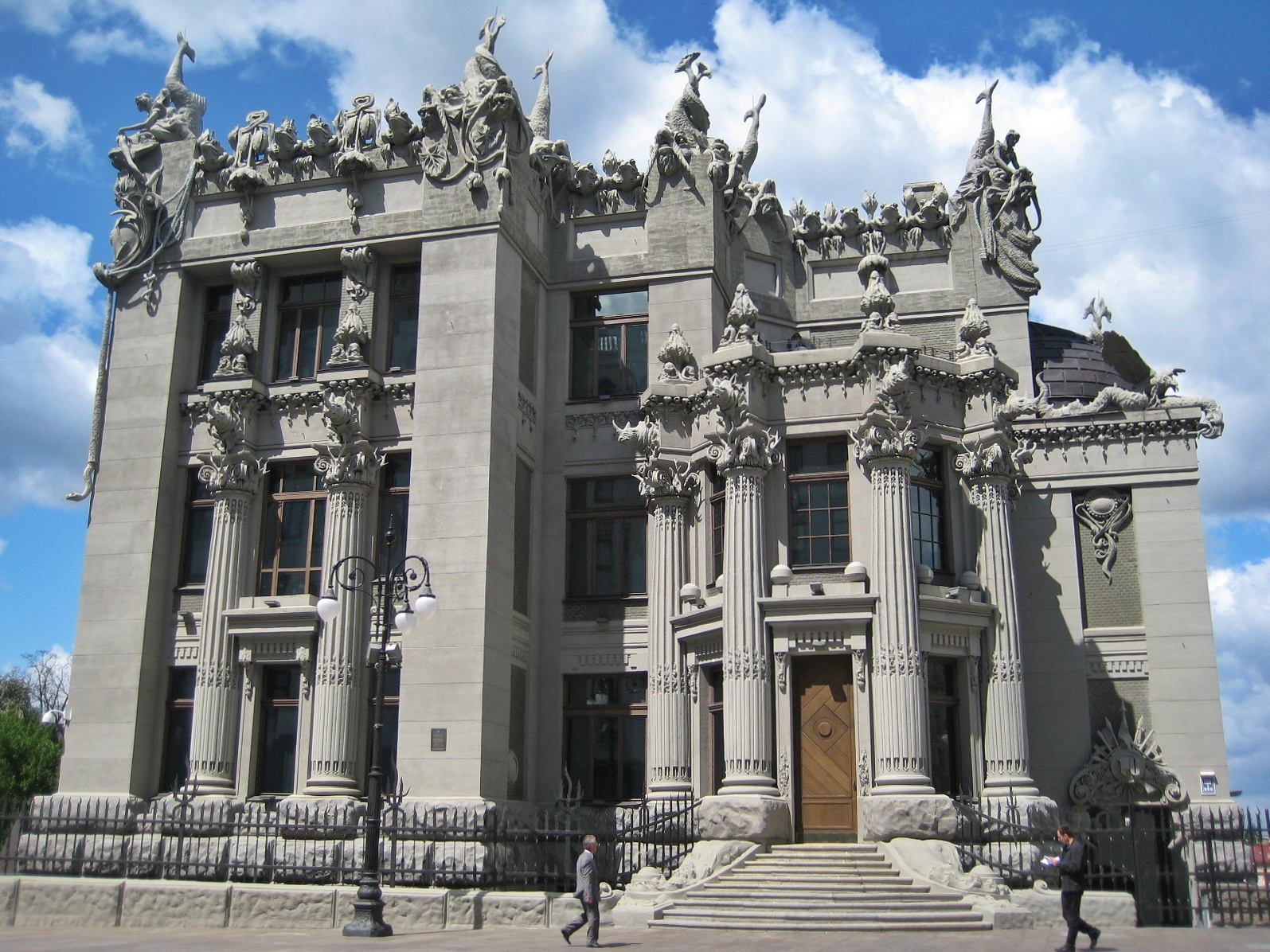
House with Chimaeras, built in 1902 by the Polish architect Władysław Horodecki

During the Russian industrial revolution in the late 19th century, Kyiv became an important trade and transportation centre of the Russian Empire, specialising in sugar and grain export by railroad and on the Dnieper river. By 1900, the city had also become a significant industrial centre, having a population of 250,000. Landmarks of that period include the railway infrastructure, the foundation of numerous educational and cultural facilities as well as notable architectural monuments (mostly merchant-oriented, i.e. Brodsky Choral Synagogue).

At that time, a large Jewish community emerged in the city, developing its own ethnic culture and business interests. This was stimulated by the prohibition of Jewish settlement in Russia proper (Moscow and Saint Petersburg) — as well as further eastwards. Expelled from Kyiv in 1654, Jews probably were not able to settle in the city again until the early 1790s. On 2 December 1827 Nicholas I of Russia expelled seven hundred Jews from the city. In 1836, the Pale of Settlement banned Jews from Kyiv as well, fencing off the city's districts from the Jewish population. Thus, at mid-century Jewish merchants who came to fairs in the city could stay for up to six months. In 1881 and 1905, notorious pogroms in the city resulted in the death of about 100 Jews.

The development of aviation (both military and amateur) became another notable mark of distinction of Kyiv in the early 20th century. Prominent aviation figures of that period include Pyotr Nesterov (aerobatics pioneer) and Igor Sikorsky, both of whom hailed from the city. The world's first helicopter was built and tested in Kyiv by Sikorsky, and in 1892 the first electric tram line of the Russian Empire was established in Kyiv.

The Ukrainian Club of national public figures thrived in Kyiv from 1908 to 1912, and thereafter continued as Rodyna. The Society of Ukrainian Progressives used the building as its centre, and it was here that the Central Rada of Ukraine was founded on 4 March 1917.

== First World War ==
Shortly after the First World War began in July 1914, the tsarist Russian government banned all publications in the Ukrainian language, such as the daily newspaper Rada headquartered in Yaroslaviv Val Street, even though it had been writing in support of Russia's war effort.

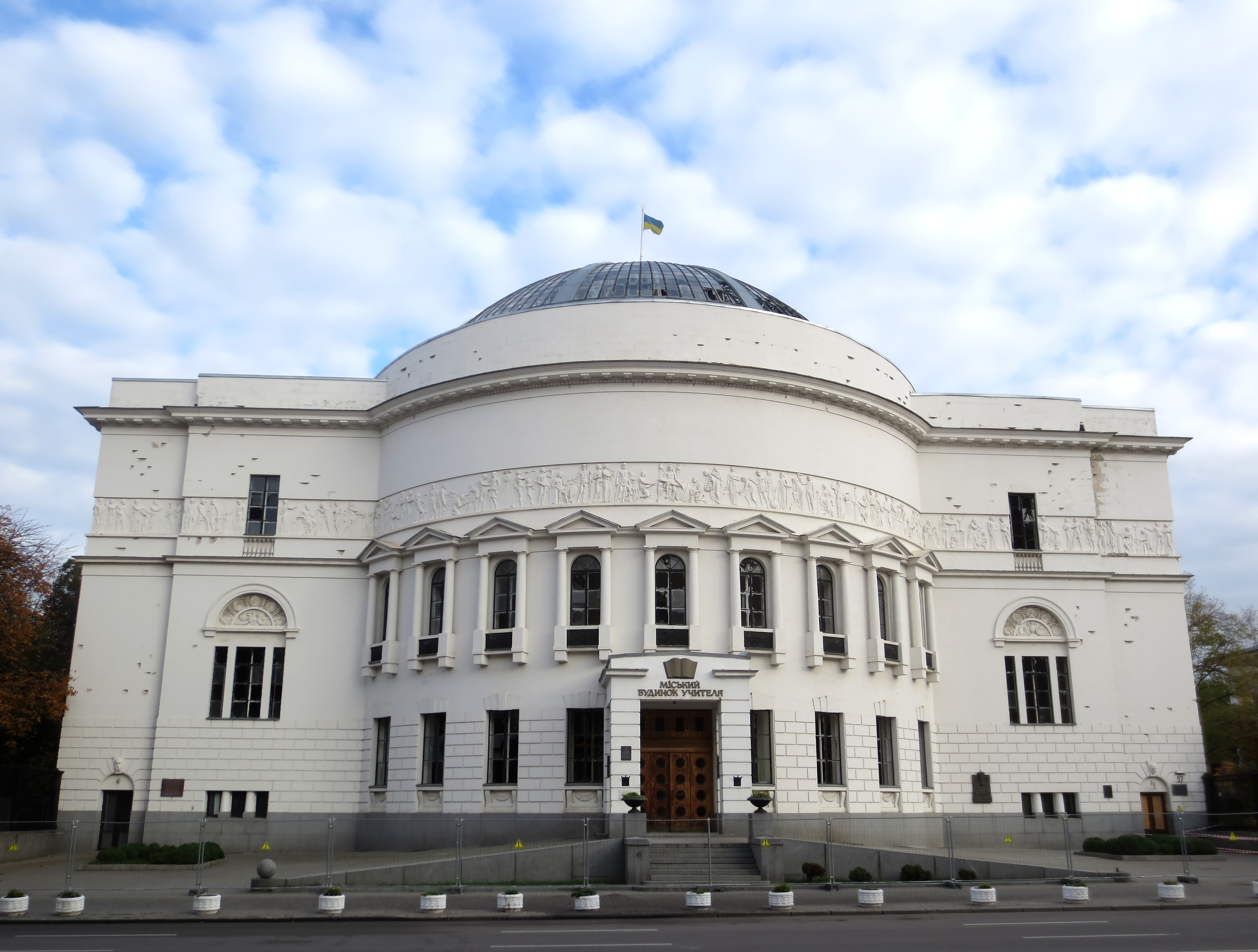
The Ukrainian Club Building on Volodymyrska Street, built in 1912, housed the Central Rada. The Ukrainian People's Republic was proclaimed here on 20 November 1917.

The February Revolution throughout the Russian Empire in 8–16 March 1917 saw profound developments in Ukraine. The establishment of the Central Rada (Council) of Ukraine (soon led by Mykhailo Hrushevsky) on 4 March 1917 even preceded it by a few days. After the Rada created the General Secretariat of Ukraine (located at 27 Khreshchatyk) in June 1917, and proclaimed Ukraine as an autonomous part of the emerging Russian Republic, the Russian Provisional Government recognised the General Secretariat as the highest executive power in Ukraine on 13 July 1917. Prime Minister Alexander Kerensky would later negotiate more detailed institutional relations between Petrograd and Kyiv, signing the Instruction for the General Secretariat of the Provisional Government in Ukraine on 17 August 1917. A Congress of the Enslaved Peoples of Russia was held in Kyiv on 21–28 September 1917, in which the Provisional Government (which had formally proclaimed the Russian Republic and abolished the Russian Empire on 1 September) also participated, which resolved that Russia was to become a federal republic that granted autonomy to its national minorities. So far, it thus seemed that the revolutionary governments in both countries' capitals were coming to an understanding, with the perspective of an autonomous Ukraine (comprising 5 of the 9 governorates of Ukraine: Kyiv, Volyn', Poltava, Chernihiv, and Podillia) as part of a post-imperial Russia. Proclaiming full independence would have been practically impossible in the summer of 1917, as the Central Rada had neither the financial nor the military means to oppose the Russian garrison of the Kiev Military District, which remained loyal to the Provisional Government in Petrograd.

However, when the Bolsheviks seized power in Petrograd during the October Revolution (7 November 1917), relations between the Petrograd Soviet and the Central Rada gradually soured. While the Central Rada and the Kievan Committee of the Bolshevik Party jointly overthrew the Kiev Military District forces of the Provisional Government in 8–13 November 1917, the Bolsheviks began agitating against the Rada, which made preparations to defend itself. The Third Universal of the Ukrainian Central Rada of 20 November 1917 formally proclaimed the Ukrainian People's Republic, with Kyiv as its capital, encompassing all 9 governorates of Ukraine, but still as a (highly) autonomous republic within a larger Russian federal republic, "so that the whole Russian Republic may become a federation of equal and free peoples." Nevertheless, while the Kiev Soviet and Bolshevik Party initially recognised the Central Rada as the highest authority in Ukraine on 16 November, they went on to challenge the Rada by means of a general strike when the Rada tried to disarm some pro-Bolshevik military units. When rumours were spread by local Bolsheviks in Odesa that the newly formed Ukrainian People's Army was going to disarm the Red Guards (militias of revolutionary socialist labourers), the Odesa Arsenal November Uprising occurred during 11–12 December 1917 (O.S. 30 November – 1 December 1917), in which the Bolsheviks and Red Guards failed to overthrow the UPR-aligned Odesa Rada and were defeated. Simultaneously, the Kiev November uprising (1917) happened on 11–12 December, during which Bolsheviks, Red Guards and army regulars attempted to seize control of the capital, but because the plan was discovered by the Rada, most of the conspirators were captured, disarmed and sent to Russia without a fight. The Ukrainian–Soviet War was now taking shape, and it became evident that Soviet Russia was going to militarily invade the Ukrainian People's Republic when the local Bolshevik uprisings (modelled after the example of Petrograd) had failed. Lenin sent the Manifesto to the Ukrainian people with ultimate demands to the Ukrainian Rada to Kyiv on 17 December 1917.

== See also ==
- History of Kyiv
  - Kiev in the Golden Horde period (1240–1362)
  - History of Kyiv (1362–1657)
  - History of Kyiv (1657–1811)
- 1919 Kiev city census
- Modern history of Ukraine

== Bibliography ==
- Bilenky, Serhiy (2018). Imperial Urbanism in the Borderlands: Kyiv, 1800–1905. Toronto: University of Toronto Press. p. 489. ISBN 978-1-4875-0172-3.
- Hamm, Michael F. (1995). Kiev: A Portrait, 1800–1917. Princeton, New Jersey: Princeton University Press. ISBN 978-0-691-02585-8.
- Katchanovski, Ivan; Kohut, Zenon E.; Nesebio, Bohdan Y.; Yurkevich, Myroslav (2013). Historical Dictionary of Ukraine. Lanham, Maryland; Toronto; Plymouth: Scarecrow Press. p. 992. ISBN 9780810878471. Archived from the original on 23 April 2023.
- Plokhy, Serhii (2006). The Origins of the Slavic Nations: Premodern Identities in Russia, Ukraine, and Belarus (PDF). New York: Cambridge University Press. pp. 10–15. ISBN 978-0-521-86403-9. Archived (PDF) from the original on 6 June 2011.
- Snyder, Timothy (2003). The Reconstruction of Nations: Poland, Ukraine, Lithuania, Belarus, 1569–1999 (PDF). New Haven, CT: Yale University Press. p. 384. ISBN 978-0-300-12841-3.
- Potichnyj, Peter J.; Pelenski, Jaroslaw; Raeff, Marc; Thekulin, Gleb, eds. (1992). Ukraine and Russia in Their Historical Encounter. Proceedings of the First Conference on Russian-Ukrainian Relations, held in Hamilton, Canada, October 8–9, 1981) (PDF). Edmonton: CIUS Press, University of Alberta. p. 354. ISBN 978-0-920862-84-1.
