= History of Kyiv (1657–1811) =

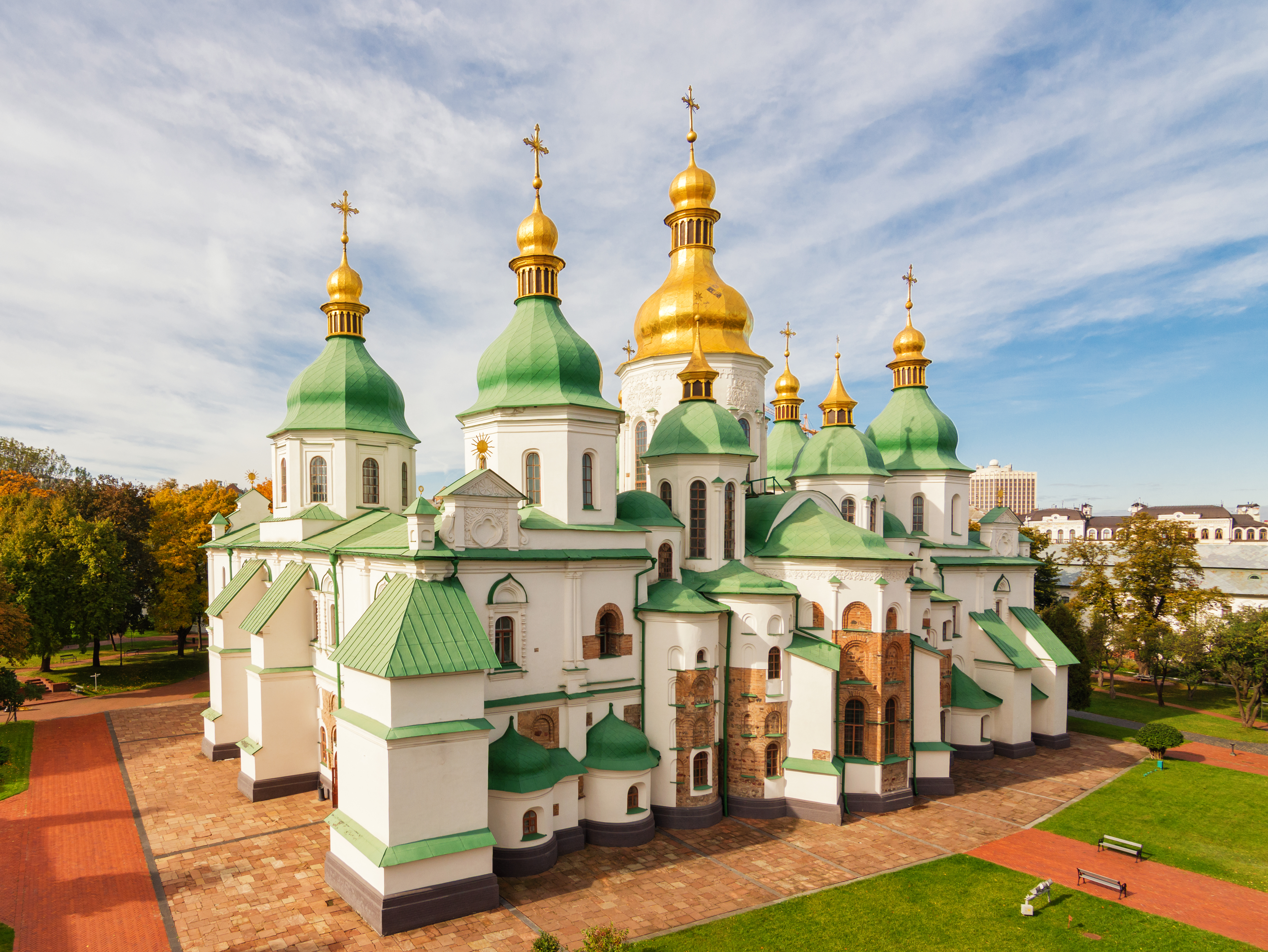
Most of the current structures of Saint Sophia Cathedral, Kyiv were built in 18th-century Ukrainian Baroque style.

The history of Kyiv from the end of the Khmelnytsky Uprising (1657) until the Great Fire of Podil (1811) encompasses the period in which it served as a significant city – although not the capital – within the Cossack Hetmanate. The 1654 Pereiaslav Agreement with the Tsardom of Russia established a Muscovite vassalage for early modern Ukraine. The first few decades were known as The Ruin, when Muscovy, the Polish–Lithuanian Commonwealth and the Crimean Khanate (itself an Ottoman vassal) competed for power and influence over the Hetmanate, while the Zaporizhian Sich increasingly went its own separate way. The city of Kiev had seen much fighting and devastation in the 1650s, with Podil (the Lower City) still being its urban centre.

== Late 17th century ==
=== Military and political history ===
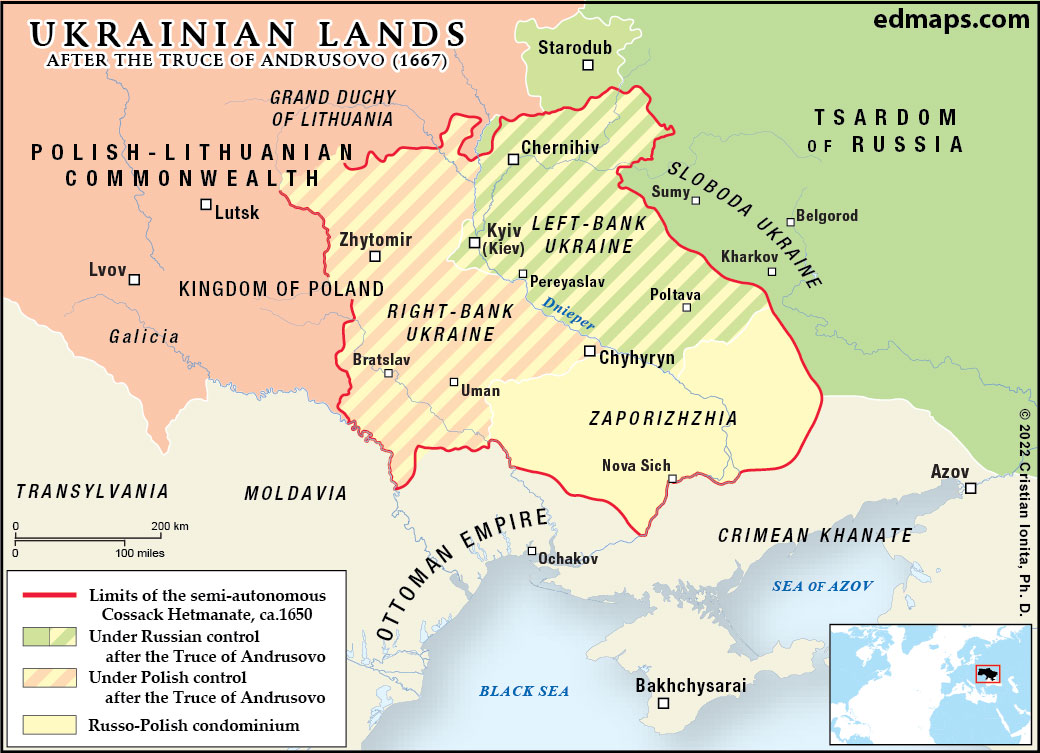
The Partition of Ukraine after the Truce of Andrusovo (1667). Russia refused to return the city of Kiev to Poland in 1669, violating the treaty of 1667.

After the death of Bohdan Khmelnytsky in 1657, in the atmosphere of sharp conflicts, his successor became Ivan Vyhovsky who signed the Treaty of Hadiach. It was ratified by the Crown in a limited version. According to Vyhovsky's original intention, Kyiv was to become the capital of the Grand Duchy of Ruthenia with limited federate rights within the Polish–Lithuanian–Ruthenian Commonwealth. However, this part of the Treaty was removed during the ratification. In the meantime, Vyhovsky's opponent Yuri Khmelnytsky signed the Second Treaty of Pereyaslav in October 1659 with a representative of the Russian tsar. In 1660, the local Armenians were expelled by Tsar Alexis of Russia.

On 31 January 1667, the Truce of Andrusovo was concluded, in which the Polish–Lithuanian Commonwealth ceded Smolensk, Severia and Chernigov, and, on paper only for a period of two years, the city of Kiev to the Tsardom of Russia. However, in 1669, Russia refused to return the city of Kiev to Poland, violating the Treaty of Andrusovo. Decades of warfare, known as The Ruin, followed between the Tsardom, the Commonwealth, the Ottoman Empire and various Cossack groupings, devastating the lands around the river Dnipro, especially depopulating right-bank Ukraine. The Eternal Peace of 1686 acknowledged the status quo and put the city under the control of Russia for the centuries to come. Ukraine slowly lost its autonomy, which was finally abolished in 1775 by the Empress Catherine the Great. None of the Polish-Russian treaties concerning the city have ever been ratified.

=== Cultural-religious and social-economic history ===
Historical population
Year	Pop.	±%
1647	15,000	—
1666	10,000	−33.3%
1763	42,000	+320.0%
1797	19,000	−54.8%
1835	36,500	+92.1%
On 1 January of specified year.

- 1661: The Kyiv Caves Patericon was printed in the city, for the first time in the original Church Slavonic.
- 1674: The Kievan Synopsis or Kyivan Synopsis was first published in the city. The narrative was strongly influenced by the recent Russo-Polish War (1654–1667), in which the Cossacks had sided with the Muscovites in order to obtain their independence from the Polish–Lithuanian Commonwealth. Moreover, the Chyhyryn campaign (1674) happened that year, in which the Cossacks were divided in pro-Ottoman and pro-Russian camps, while Poland demanded the city of Kiev to be handed over per the Treaty of Andrusovo. Finally, the Orthodox monastic circle of Innokenti Gizel, where this work was first produced, was fervently aligned with Orthodoxy, and opposed to Polish Catholicism and Ottoman Islam. Therefore, the Synopsis presented a rather pro-Russian perspective of Ukrainian history, championing Muscovy as the legitimate heir of Kievan Rus', instead of Halych-Volyn' or the Grand Duchy of Lithuania-Ruthenia, as previous generations had done. The Kievan Synopsis, which "presented Kyiv as the cradle of the Rus' dynasty, state, nation, and religion", became "the most popular historical work in the premodern Russian Empire". Nevertheless, Gizel and the other Orthodox clerics of the Kyiv Pechersk Lavra sought to remain independent of the Moscow Patriarchate, and treated the tsar as the protector of their ecclesiastical independence.
- c. 1685–1722: The annexation of the Metropolis of Kyiv by the Moscow Patriarchate occurred. By the end of the 17th century, the territory of the Metropolis of Kiev, Galicia and all Rus' (1620–1686) had shrunk considerably.
- 1693: The Cathedral of the Epiphany was built.
- 1694: The Kyiv-Mohyla Collegium was elevated to the status of 'Academy' by Ivan Mazepa, although this was not officially confirmed in the name until 1701.
- 1696: St. Nicholas Military Cathedral was consecrated as part of the Kyiv Fortress.
- 1696–1701: Most extant buildings of the Vydubychi Monastery were built, with the bell tower being constructed later in 1727–1733.

== 18th century ==
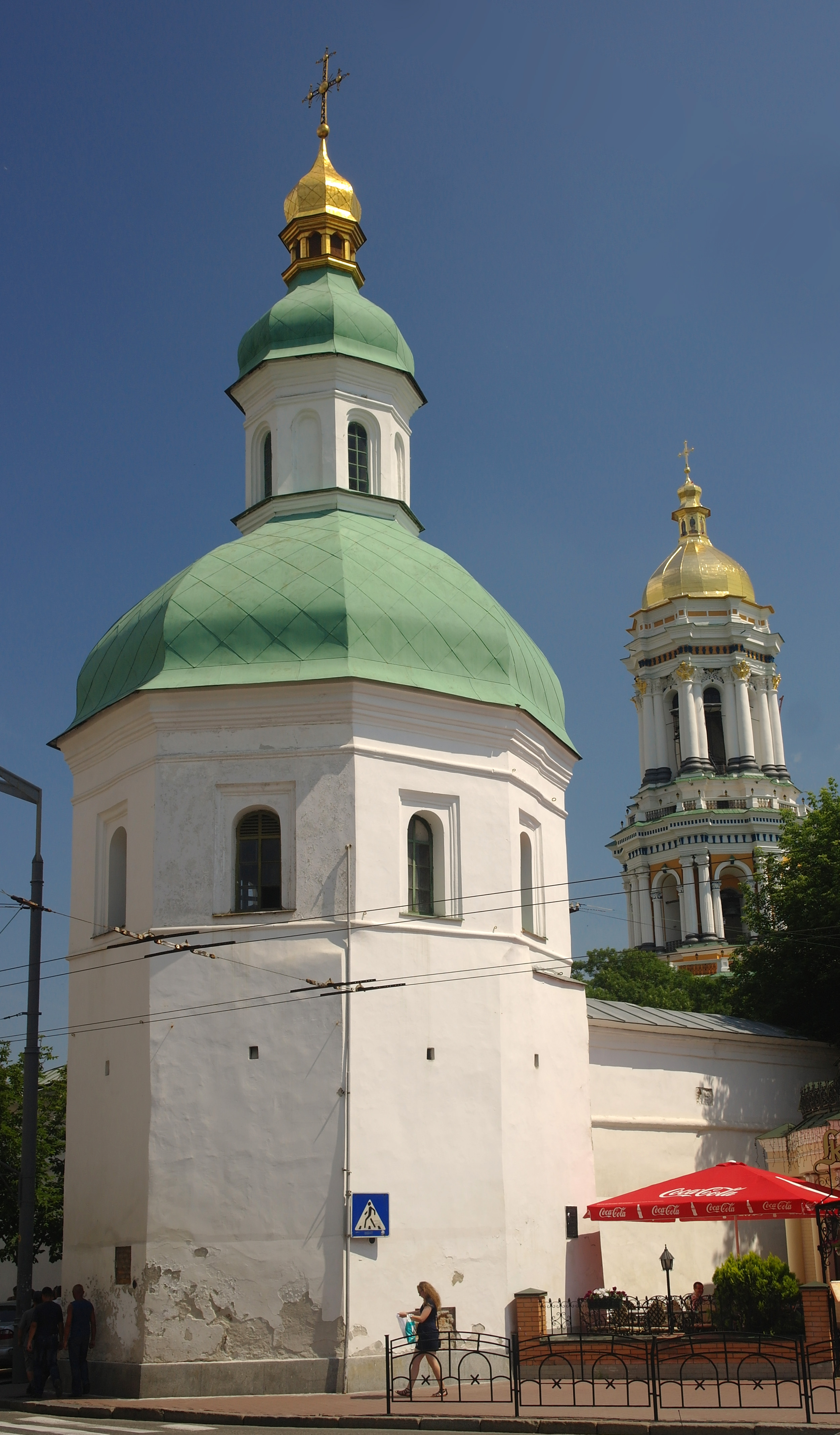
Ivan Kushchnyk Tower, Kyiv Pechersk Lavra, built between 1696 and 1701 in the Ukrainian Baroque style of Ivan Mazepa.

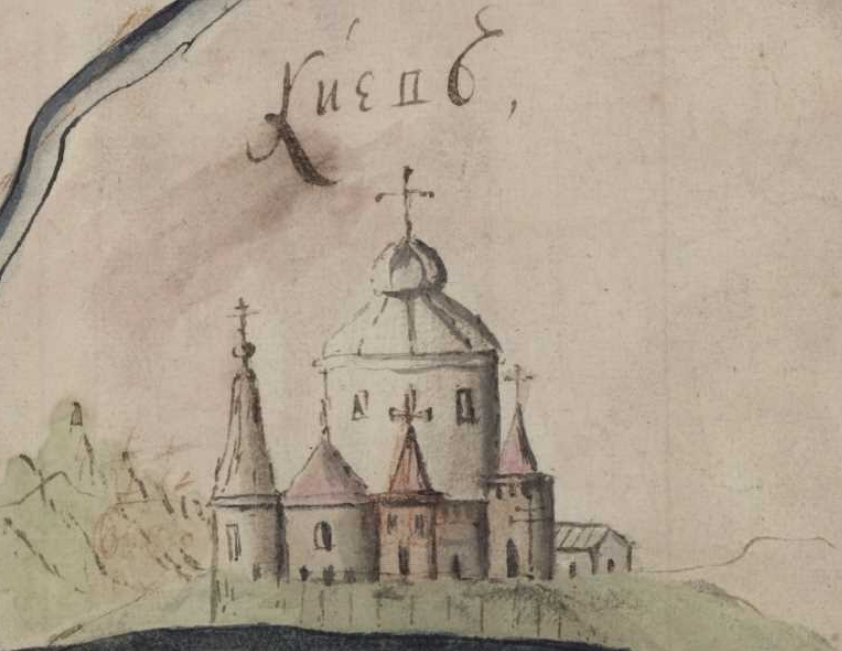
Kiev on an 18th-century map

In 1696–1701, with the funds of Hetman Ivan Mazepa and under the leadership of architect Dmytro Aksamytov, a stone wall with several towers (such as the Ivan Kushchnyk Tower) and churches was built around the Upper Lavra, strengthening the existing Kyiv Fortress. After inspecting the city's fortifications around 1706, Tsar Peter I ordered the construction of the new Pechersk Lavra fortification. The work was carried out under the leadership of military engineer Hoffmann, while supervision of the construction was entrusted to Hetman Ivan Mazepa and Colonel Geisen. Construction lasted from 1706 to 1723.

- 1699–1706: The Bell Tower of Saint Sophia Cathedral was built.
- 1700–1704: The Near Caves main temple, the Church of the Elevation of the Cross, was constructed in Ukrainian Baroque style, next to the medieval tunnel complex dating from the 11th century.
- 1701: The Imperial Theological Academy was formed.
- 1708: The earlier Kiev Governorate was established.
- 1713–1715: The Refectory Church of the Holy Apostle and Evangelist John the Theologian was built as part of St. Michael's Golden-Domed Monastery, using the bricks of Kyiv's Simeon Church, which had been destroyed by fire in 1676.
- 1718: The Great Fire of 1718 severely damaged the city archives.
- 1729: The Dormition Cathedral, Kyiv Pechersk Lavra, damaged by the 1718 Great Fire, was restored in Ukrainian Baroque style. In addition, throughout the 18th century, the Lavra Icon Painting Workshop was active in restoring or creating numerous icons in ecclesiastical buildings of Kiev.
- 1732: The Florivsky Convent church was dedicated.
- 1734: St. Cyril's Monastery, Kyiv suffered a severe fire. The medieval architectural interior was preserved, while the external structures were rebuilt in Ukrainian Baroque by Ivan Hryhorovych-Barskyi during 1750–1760.
- 1745: The Great Lavra Bell Tower was built.
- 1747–1754: St Andrew's Church, Kyiv was built in Elizabethan Baroque; a rare example in Ukraine.
- 1749: The Fountain of Samson was constructed.
- 1752: The Mariinskyi Palace was built.
- 1752–1770: The Pyrohoshcha Church, the main church in Podil, was rebuilt in Ukrainian Baroque style (after a previous 1613 Renaissance-style reconstruction).
- 1754: St Andrew's Church was built.
- 1756: The Klov Palace was built.
- 1764:
  - The Kyiv Arsenal was established.
  - The Cossack Hetmanate was abolished and the Little Russia Governorate established, replacing the earlier earlier Kiev Governorate. The capital was initially at Hlukhiv (1764–1773; previously the capital of the Hetmanate), then Kozelets (1773–1775), and finally back at Kiev (1775–1781).
- 1781: The Kiev Viceroyalty (excluding the city of Kiev itself) and Novgorod-Seversky Viceroyalty were established, replacing the earlier Little Russia Governorate (1764–1781).
- 1782: The Coat of arms of Kyiv was redesigned.
- 1796: The Kiev Viceroyalty (excluding the city of Kiev itself) was abolished, and replaced by the later Little Russia Governorate (1796–1802).
- 1797:
  - 16 September 1797: Emperor Paul I of Russia promulgated a ukase confirming the traditional privileges of the citizens of Kiev. A grouping of Kievan citizens then presented Paul with a 1654 patent from tsar Alexis of Russia, according to which the townspeople were exempt from military service. This privilege had been abolished, although wealthy citizens (especially merchants) could pay a sum of money instead of being drafted. Now that Paul ordered the old privileges to be restored literally, merchants demanded the reimbursement of money paid to avoid service. This meant that the Governing Senate had to find out the exact number of citizens and merchants who had been granted this privilege in 1654, even though the civil registration of the preceding period had effectively been lost due to the Great Fire of 1718. Based on the revisions of 1782 or 1795, approximate figures had to be calculated to determine this number.
  - The contracts fair was transferred to Kyiv from Dubno.
- 1798: Emperor Paul I issued a ukase on 18 December 1798, requiring the noble estates in all governorates (gubernijas) to pay a proportionate annual lump sum in taxes to the Imperial Russian treasury. A total of 1,640,000 rubles was collected throughout the Empire, with the Kiev Governorate paying 72,000 rubles (4.39%), the second-highest tax revenue (after the 80,000 rubles of the Little Russia Governorate) from the seven governorates of Ukraine.

== Early 19th century ==
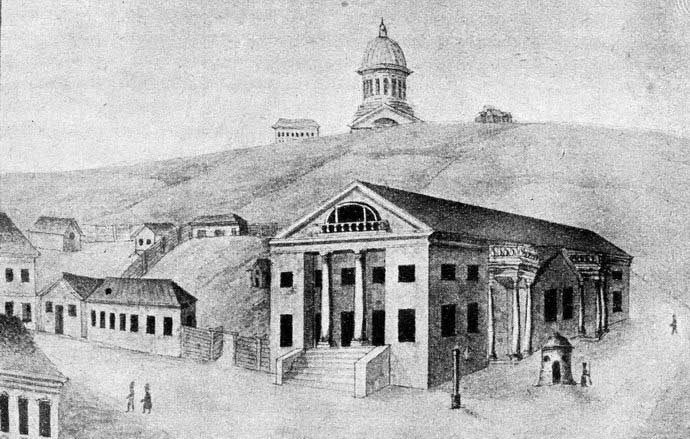
The First City Theatre of Kyiv, built in 1804–1805

- 1802: The later Kiev Governorate was established, including Right-bank Ukraine.
- 1806: The First City Theatre (Kyiv) was inaugurated.
- 1810
  - The city was subdivided into 4 administrative districts.
  - The Church of St Nicholas on Askold's Grave was built.
- 1811: The Great Fire of Podil devastated the city. Reconstruction in subsequent years fundamentally changed the urban landscape.

== See also ==
- Early modern history of Ukraine
- History of Kyiv
  - Kiev in the Golden Horde period (1240–1362)
  - History of Kyiv (1362–1657)
  - History of Kyiv (1811–1917)

== Bibliography ==
- "Kiev". Russia with Teheran, Port Arthur, and Peking. Leipzig: Karl Baedeker. 1914. OCLC 1328163.
- Katchanovski, Ivan; Kohut, Zenon E.; Nesebio, Bohdan Y.; Yurkevich, Myroslav (2013). Historical Dictionary of Ukraine. Lanham, Maryland; Toronto; Plymouth: Scarecrow Press. p. 992. ISBN 9780810878471. Archived from the original on 23 April 2023.
- Plokhy, Serhii (2006). The Origins of the Slavic Nations: Premodern Identities in Russia, Ukraine, and Belarus (PDF). New York: Cambridge University Press. pp. 10–15. ISBN 978-0-521-86403-9. Archived (PDF) from the original on 6 June 2011.
- Hösch, Edgar (1992). "Paul I and Ukraine". In Potichnyj, Peter J.; Pelenski, Jaroslaw; Raeff, Marc; Thekulin, Gleb (eds.). Ukraine and Russia in Their Historical Encounter. Proceedings of the First Conference on Russian-Ukrainian Relations, held in Hamilton, Canada, October 8–9, 1981) (PDF). Edmonton: CIUS Press, University of Alberta. pp. 86–100. ISBN 978-0-920862-84-1.
