= Church of the Saviour at Berestove =

Church building in Kyiv, Ukraine

Coordinates: 50.437333°N 30.555001°E

- Церква Спаса на Берестові
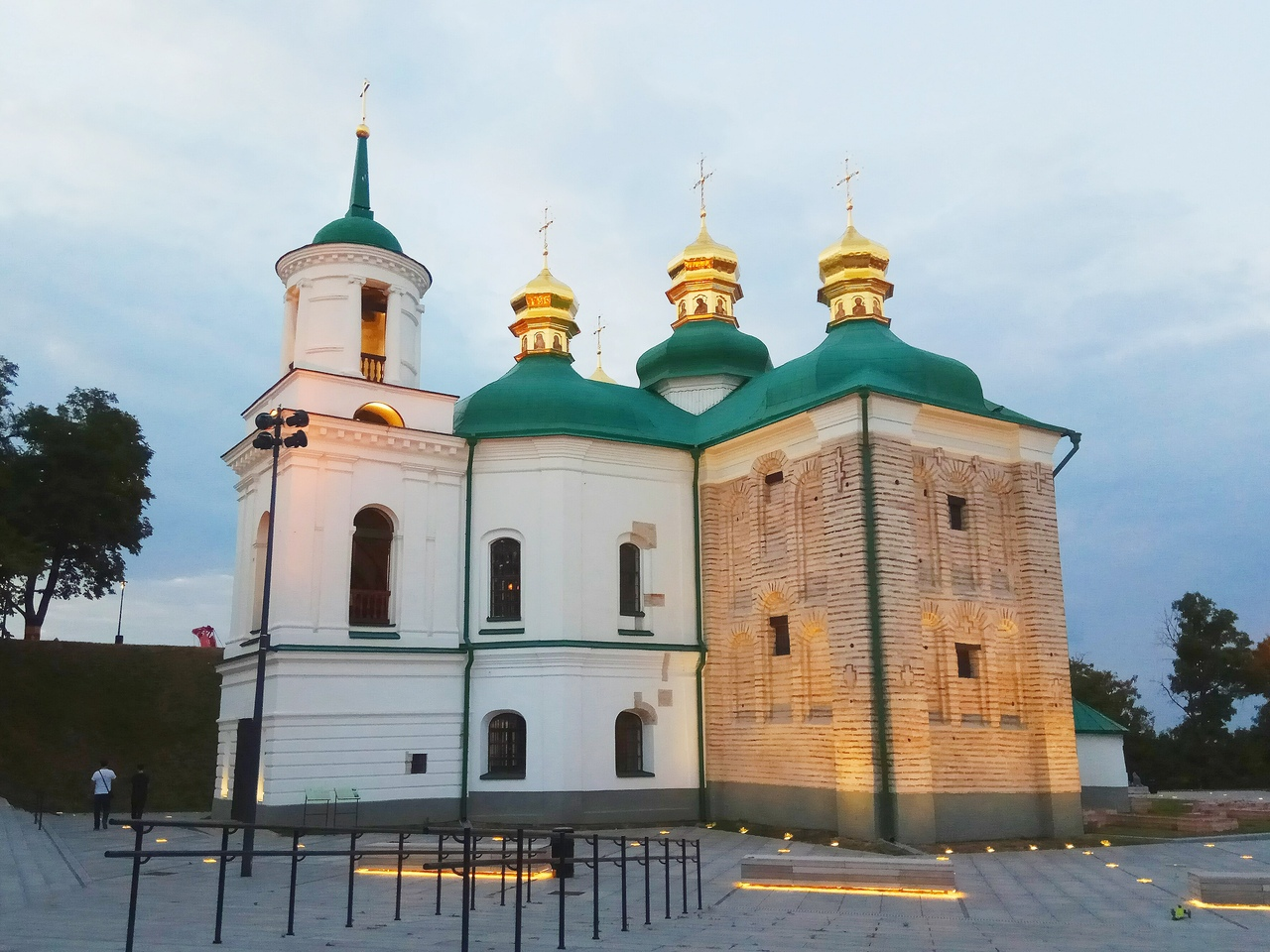
- Side view of the Church of the Saviour in Berestove seen with its 19th-century steepled belfry. A portion of the wall cleaned from stucco belongs to the early 12th century.
- Church of the Saviour at Berestove
- Location: Berestove, Pecherskyi District, Kyiv
- Country: Ukraine

Architecture
- Style: Byzantine architecture, Ukrainian Baroque
- Years built: 12th century

UNESCO World Heritage Site
- Official name: Church of the Saviour at Berestove
- Location: Europe
- Part of: Kyiv: Saint-Sophia Cathedral and Related Monastic Buildings, Kyiv-Pechersk Lavra
- Criteria: i, ii, iii, iv
- Reference: 527
- Inscription: 1990 (14th Session)
- Endangered: 2023

Immovable Monument of National Significance of Ukraine
- Official name: Церква Спаса на Берестові (Church of the Saviour at Berestove)
- Type: Architecture
- Reference no.: 260089

The Church of the Saviour at Berestove (Ukrainian: Церква Спаса на Берестові, romanized: Tserkva Spasa na Berestovi) is a church located immediately north of Kyiv Pechersk Lavra in an area known as Berestove. Although it is situated outside the Lavra fortifications, the Saviour Church is part of the Lavra complex and the related World Heritage Site.

== Architecture ==
Berestove was a suburban residence of Vladimir the Great (who died there in 1015) and some of his descendants, including Vsevolod I and Vladimir II. It was also the site of a monastery, first recorded in 1073. Construction of the present structure is not documented, but most art historians date it to the reign of Vladimir Monomakh (1113–1125). Indeed, it has structural parallels with the churches of Pereiaslav, especially those built during Monomakh's administration of the town at the turn of the 12th century.

Monomakh's court church was larger than most cathedrals built in Kyiv in the 12th century and had three naves, three apses, and probably three domes. The western (narthex) wall survives almost intact, while the other walls are known by way of excavations. The western part of the church was separated from the naos, forming a narthex, flanked by a baptistery on the north and a projecting tower on the south. The tower contained the winding stairs leading to the gallery for the ruling prince, his family, and guests.

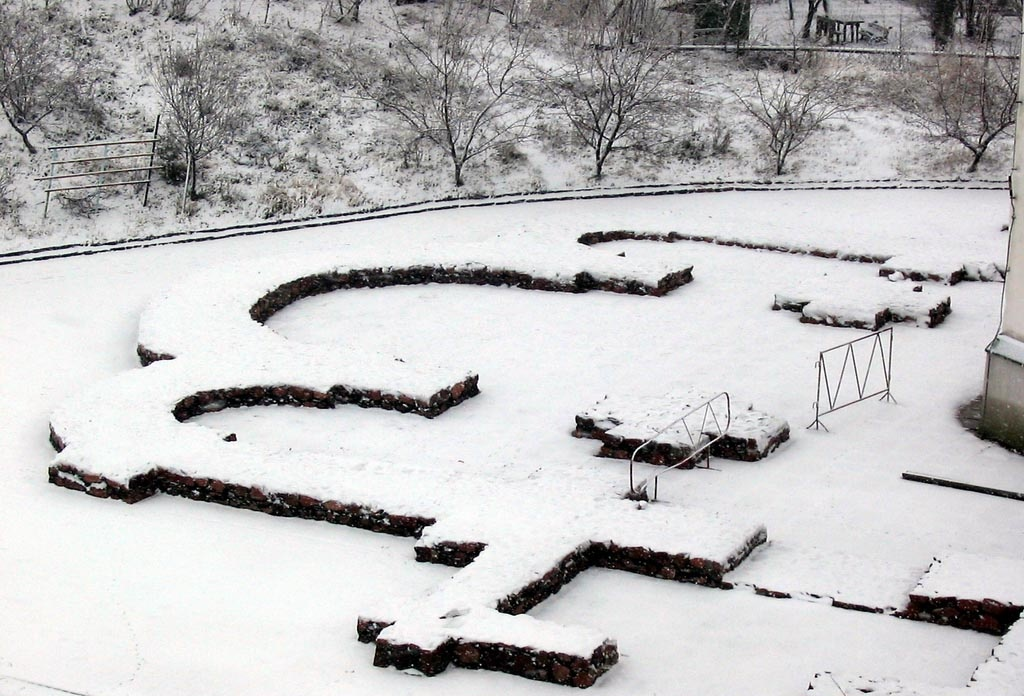
The foundations of the apses of Monomakh's church.

Art historians believe that the Saviour Church introduced some structural innovations into architecture of Kievan Rus'. For the first time in Rus, all three entrances had projecting porches with steeply pitched trefoil roofs. This novel feature may be interpreted as key to the overall concept of the church. Monomakh's architects apparently wished to emphasize verticality of the church, a basically Gothic formula which would be fully developed in Smolensk and Polotsk.

If the Berestove church was indeed the first germ of this new manner, its vaulting may have been unusually complicated, probably echoing the trefoil roofing of the porches. The outside of the church formerly displayed intricate brick patterns: double and treble niches, the meander, and decorative crosses. For the first time in Kyiv, no limestone was used in the construction, once again foreshadowing the practices of the mid-12th century.

== History ==
Following Monomakh's death, the church was long associated with his family. At least three Monomachids were buried underneath the baptistery: George I of Kiev (the founder of Moscow), his son Gleb and his daughter Eufemia. The church was damaged in 1240 when Batu Khan sacked Kyiv and again in 1482, when Khan Meñli I Giray ravaged the neighbourhood. Its walls collapsed and it stood in ruins until the 17th century.

It was the Metropolitan Petro Mohyla who started to restore the Kyivan churches, long neglected during the Polish-Lithuanian rule. He had the Berestove church restored in the national Ukrainian ("proto-Baroque") style. The new church was under construction in 1640–1642. Incorporating the western wall of Monomakh's structure, Mohyla's church is smaller and differs considerably from its predecessor: there are five towers arranged on a four-petaled plan and surrounded by five massive pear-shaped domes. Two years later, a team of Greek masters painted the interior with frescoes. The most famous of these, known as Petro Mohyla's Gift, features a portrait of Mohyla kneeling before Christ to whom he presents a model of the church.

The interior was renovated in 1751–1752 and again in 1813–1814, when Fedor M. Korobka carved an elaborate altar. At the same time, a two-tier belltower was constructed to Andriy Melenskyi's provincial Neoclassical design which is out of keeping with the rest of the church.

In 1909, Academician Pokryshkin (who specialized in ancient Orthodox architecture) was called upon to restore the church to its medieval appearance. Pokryshkin's restoration works lasted for five years but did not result in any fundamental changes. The foundations of Monomakh's original church were uncovered and may still be seen to the east from the extant structure. The façade of the church was cleaned so as to highlight the surviving parts of the 12th-century building, which had been scraped of stucco.

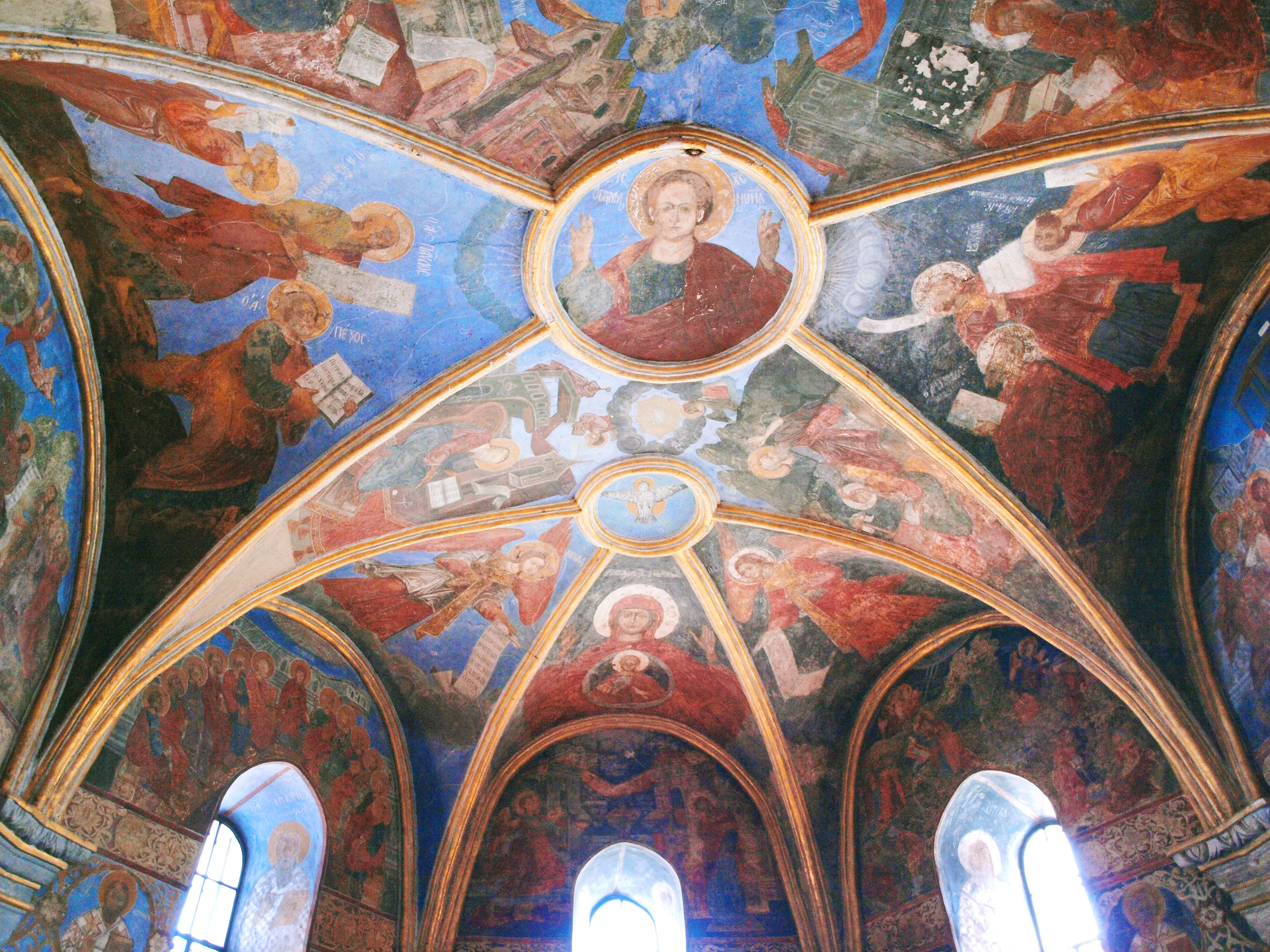
Interior view of the church seen with its bright frescos.

On 7 September 1947, in the course of the celebration of the 800th anniversary of the foundation of Moscow, in the former Vladimir chapel of the church, a large granite sarcophagus was installed by architect P.Ostapenko over the place where it is believed Yuri Dolgoruky, the founder of Moscow, had been buried.

In the early 1970s, a fragment of the 12th-century fresco Miraculous Fishing, depicting Christ walking on water towards a boat, was uncovered in the church. Since Ukraine's independence after the fall of the Soviet Union, the church is part of the Kyiv Pechersk Lavra Historical-Cultural Reserve and functions primarily as a museum, holding weekly church services on Sundays.

=== Research (2002–2004) ===
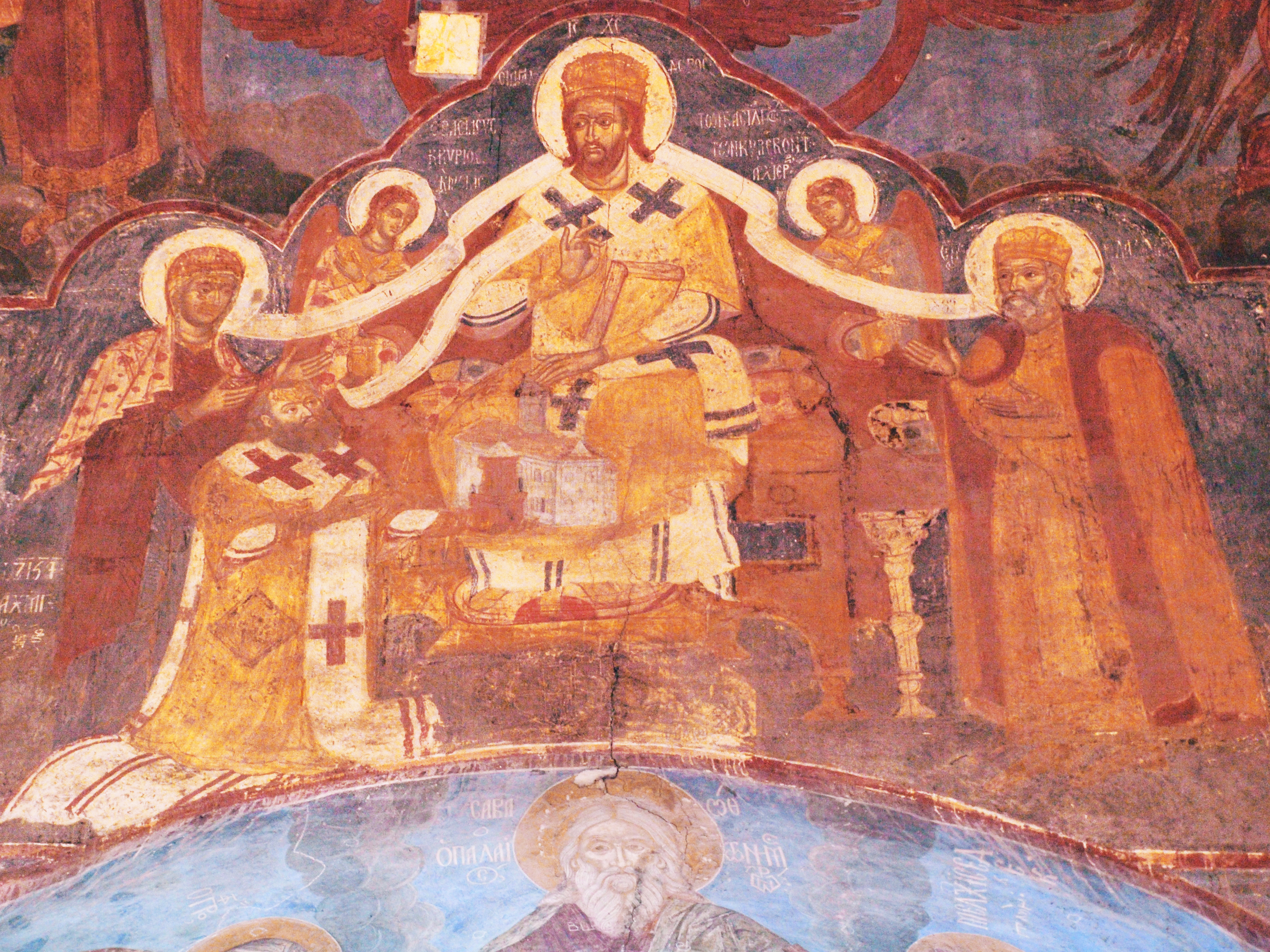
Petro Mohyla's Gift fresco

In 2001, the Getty Institute for Architectural Conservation awarded a grant for a project to prepare the restoration of the Church of the Savior on Berestove to help preserve it as a landmark of world significance. In 2002–2003, as part of the Getty Foundation's grant program, scientific and restoration research was conducted at the church to develop a project for the conservation and museumification of the monument and to carry out urgent work. The research was conducted by an architectural and archaeological expedition of the National Academy of Sciences of Ukraine led by Hlib Ivakin, with the participation of the archaeological department of the National Kyiv-Pechersk Historical and Cultural Reserve, in particular S. Balakin, O. Zazhigalov, D. Finadorin, as well as scientists and technologists from the State Center for Conservation and Restoration of Archaeological Monuments.

A scientific, technological, engineering, and design survey of the facades, roof and floor structures, and paintings in the church's interior was carried out. As a result of the work, data confirming the theory that the church was founded in the 11th century were obtained, as well as information about an unknown reconstruction of the church in the 14th–16th centuries.

In 2003–2004, about ten pits were laid inside the church to determine the technical condition of the foundations and the nature of their restoration, which was carried out during the 1914 excavations under the direction of Petro Pokryshkin.

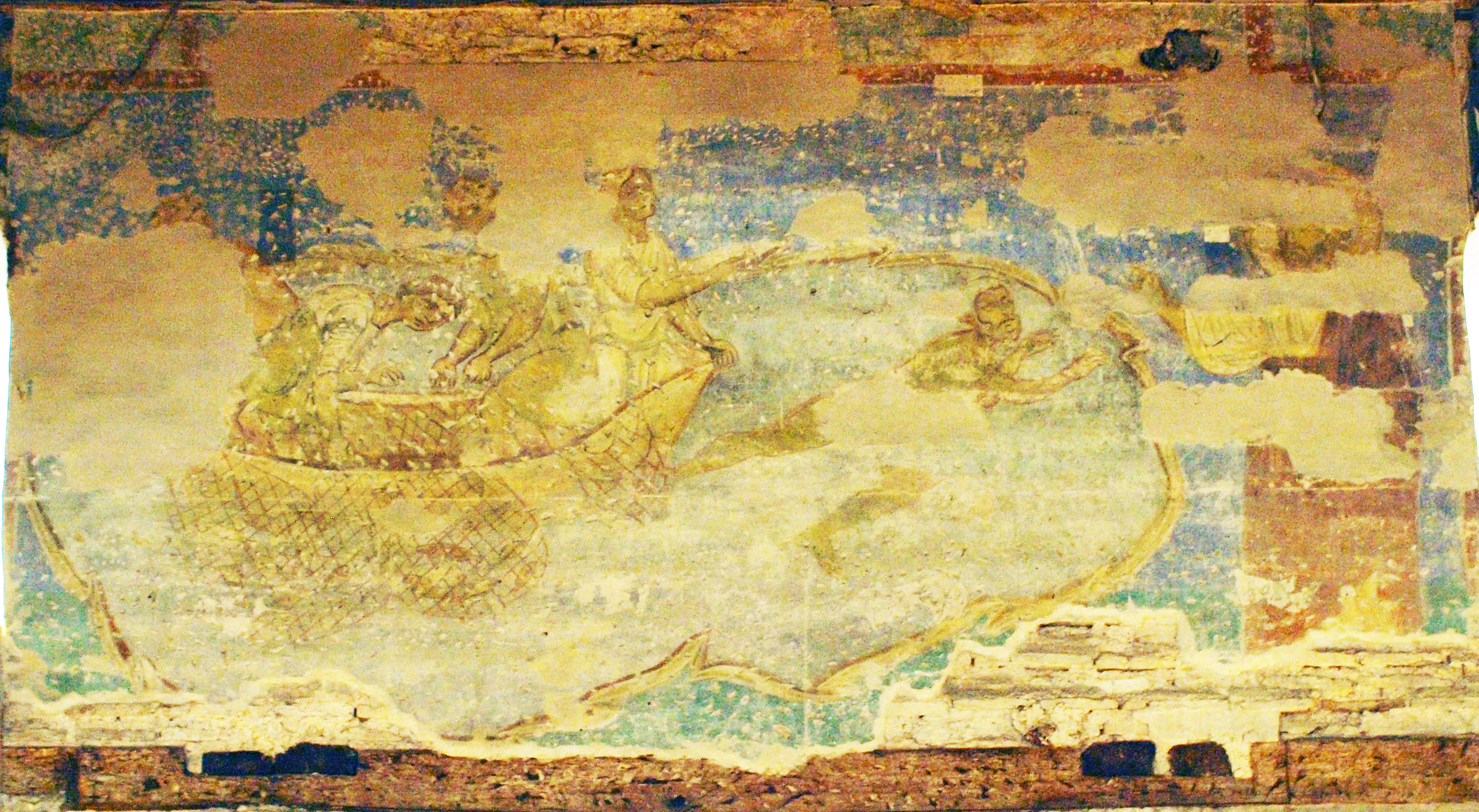
Miraculous Fishing fresco

=== Restoration (2017–2019) ===
In 2017, restoration work began at the Church of the Savior in Berestove. The project included the restoration of the church inside and the area around it, as well as a range of conservation and restoration work. During the restoration work, all authentic fragments of the monument were preserved. According to the director of the Kyiv-Pechersk Reserve, Liubomyr Mykhailyna, the frescoes of the church are of particular value. The patron of the project is Viacheslav Moskalevsky, who allocated 50 million hryven for this project. The restoration work lasted 2 years and was successfully completed in 2019.

== See also ==
- Category:Burials at the Church of the Saviour at Berestove
