= Great Fire of Podil =

Coordinates: 50.469167°N 30.515278°E

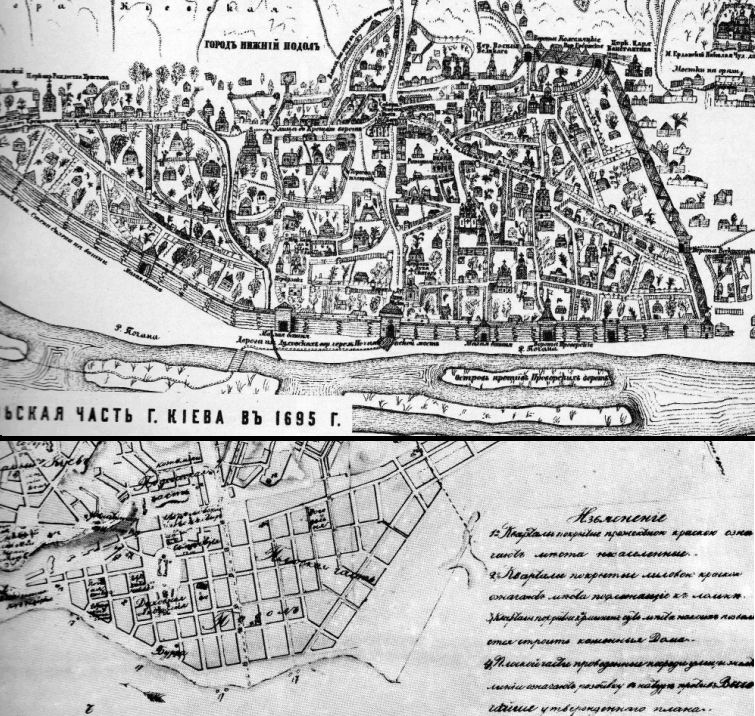
Comparison of Podil's urban planning before (top, 1695) and after the fire (bottom, 1853)

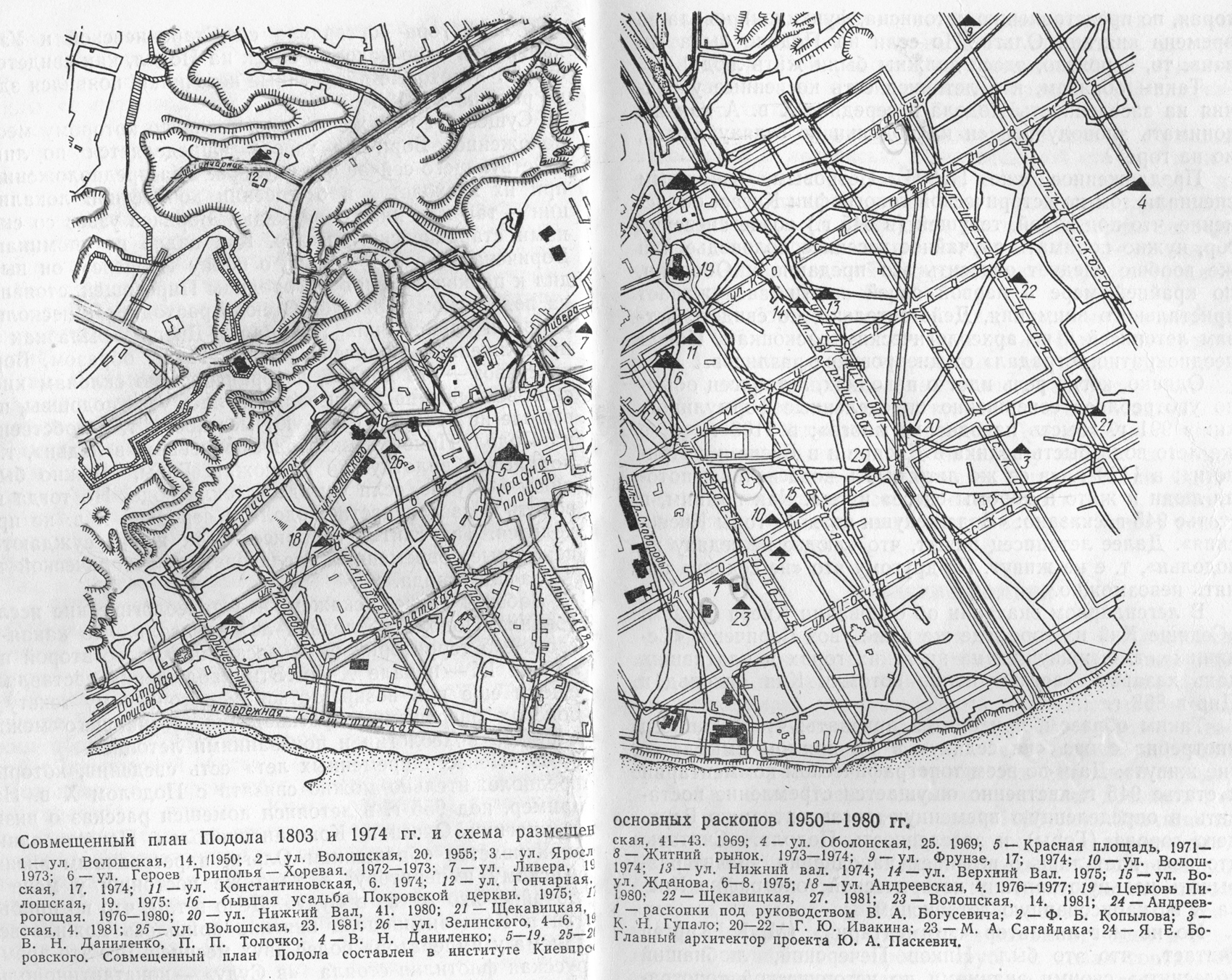
Combined map of Podil 1804 and 1974. From the "Podil in ancient Kiev" book authored by K.N.Hupalo

The 1811 Great Fire of Podil (Ukrainian: Велика пожежа, Velyka pozhezha) occurred on the morning of 9 July 1811 in the historical and commercial neighborhood of Podil in Kiev (Kyiv), the capital of Ukraine. The fire lasted for three days and almost destroyed the whole neighborhood. Before the fire, Podil was the city's most densely populated neighborhood; out of 3,672 households in the city, 2,068 were located in the Podil.

It was speculated that the fire was set by French spies or by their local collaborators on the eve of the French invasion of Russia.

The fire's power was strengthened with high winds and the season's severe droughts, from which even the nearby Dnieper River was reported to have been dried out. The city's official version of events regarding the cause of the fire, however, was said to be children playing with fire.

More than 2,000 homes, magistrate buildings, 12 churches, and 3 monasteries were destroyed in the fire. However, some buildings were spared destruction, including the House of Peter I. Smoke from the fire was reported to have been seen more than 130 km (81 mi) away. In response to the fire, the Director of the Kiev Myshkovsky Gymnasium No. 3 stated:

[that it's the] third since the historic city's foundation, and the first since the times of Batyi [Khan].

— Makarov, p. 368

In 1812, a new plan for the reconstruction of Podil was drawn up by architects Geste and Melensky. The plan had redrawn the neighborhood's curved streets into straightaways, thus creating the square city blocks that exist to this day. The fire showed the vulnerability of the city's wooden buildings, some of which would later be reconstructed in stone. Reconstruction after the fire brought about the construction of many architectural landmarks currently standing, including the Contracts House and Gostnyi Dvir, among many others.

Nevertheless, some streets remained in the shape they were in before the fire. These are Borychiv Tik, Pokrovska, Pritisko-Mykilska, per.Khoryva.

== See also ==
- 1961 Kurenivka mudslide in Kyiv
- Scorched earth
