= Lavra Icon Painting Workshop =

Icon-painting School of the Kyiv Pechersk Lavra has long been the center of Kievan Rus and Ukrainian painting. It was founded by Alipy Pechersky at the beginning of the 12th century.

== History ==
According to chronicles and the Kyiv-Pechersk Patericon, the icon-painting and painting workshop of the Kyiv-Pechersk Lavra was established at the end of the 11th century and soon became a prominent centre of icon painting in Kievan Rus. A professional art school emerged here only at the end of the 17th century. Kyiv-Pechersk Lavra has been a centre of both icon writing and painting since the times of Kievan Rus. One of its first masters was the Pechersk monk Alimpiy, who, presumably, participated in the decoration of the newly built Great Church of the Pechersk Lavra (Dormition Cathedral, Kiev) and simultaneously learned the technique of fresco painting from Greek masters who arrived in Kyiv from Byzantium in 1083.

Greek masters worked together with Kievan Rus icon painters on the interior decoration of the cathedral until its consecration in 1089. In 1951, archaeologists excavated the remains of an ancient workshop for the production of enamel for mosaics near the Assumption Cathedral on the territory of the Kyiv-Pechersk Lavra. The surviving icons created by Alimpiy, such as "Svenska (Pecherska) Mother of God with the future Saints Anthony and Theodosius" and "Yaroslavska Oranta," both held in the collection of the Tretyakov Gallery in Moscow, Russia, attest to the high level of ancient Rus art in the Lavra. Other works include miniatures for the Kiev Psalter of 1397 of 1397 and a relief triptych "Mother of God with Anthony and Theodosius" from 1470.

Some portraits of works from the icon-painting school of the Kyiv Pechersk Lavra

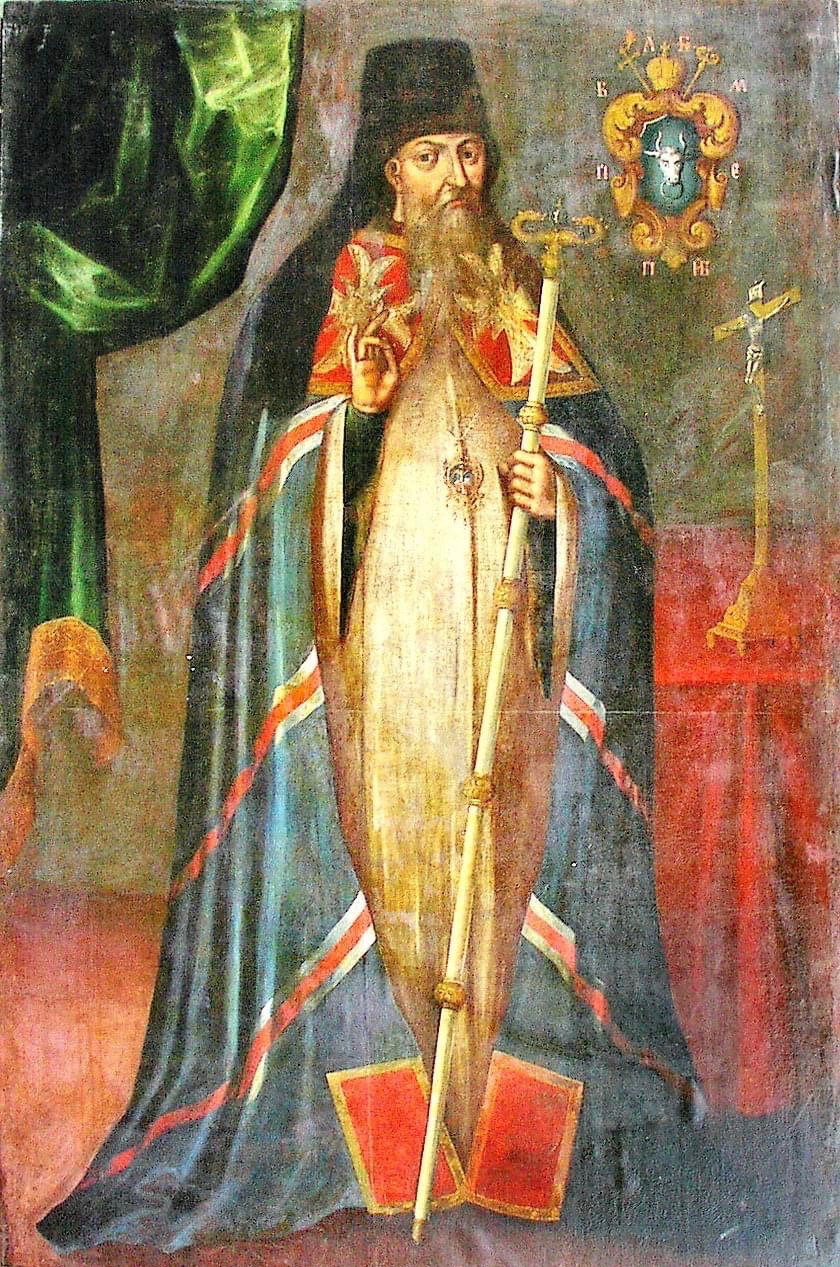
Arseniy Berlo

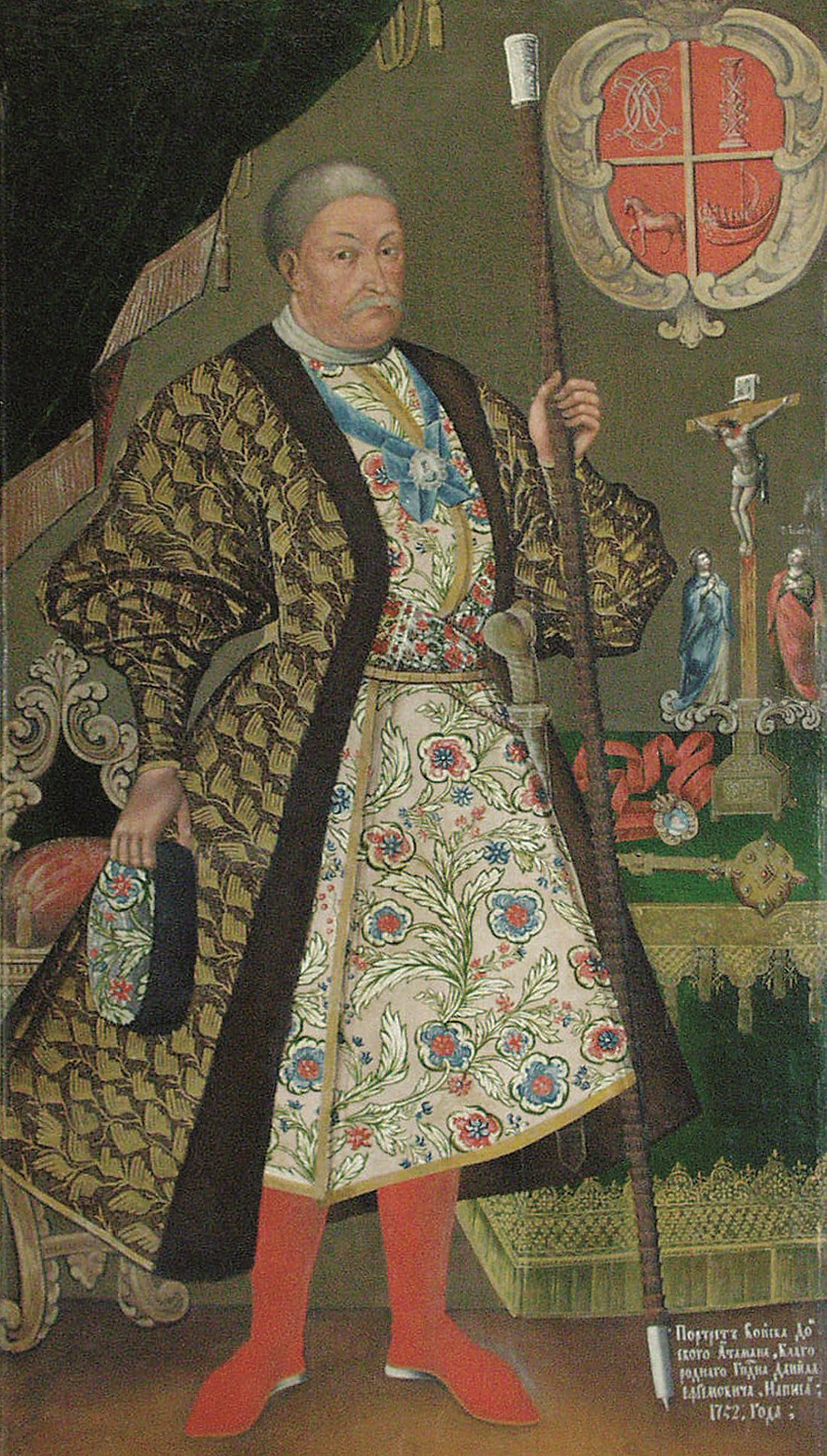
Danylo Yefremov

The workshop had its system of artistic education. Students of the school represented different social strata of society—clergy, townspeople, peasants. At the first stage of training, they mastered the ability to depict plants, natural landscapes, animals, and people. At the second stage, they created easel icon paintings and engaged in monumental painting. Numerous educational drawings of the Lavra workshop students and works of its teachers have been preserved, created in the first half of the 18th century, including prints, among which are many portraits of prominent religious and political figures. Today, these works represent significant cultural and scientific value, serving as a kind of encyclopedia of contemporary Ukrainian painting. Similarly, "kuntshi" (small drawings or booklets; "kuntsh" means a drawing or picture) on religious subjects created in the workshop from the late 17th century reflect the peculiarities of Ukrainian graphics and painting of that era.

The painting school and workshop began operating from the late 17th century, and the creative work of the renowned Ukrainian engraver Antoniy (Tarasovych) was associated with it.

In the 17th-century Lavra painting workshop, monk-painters, also known as "maліїks," worked, and young apprentices, referred to as "molodyky," received instruction. Over the years, the workshop was led by various individuals, including Ivan (Maxymovych) and Feoktist Pavlovsky (1724–1744), Alimpiy Halyk (1744–1755), Italian artist V. Frederiche (from 1755), and Zakhariy Holubovsky (from 1763). The training took place in isolated cells, with students and monk-iconographers separated from each other. In 1763, a specially organized united Lavra painting workshop changed the isolated nature of the studio.

The high skill of the icon painters in the workshop is evidenced by the remarkable monuments of Ukrainian monumental painting. For many centuries, the Kyiv Pechersk Lavra endured numerous attacks by enemies, fires, and destruction, yet the churches and temples were consistently rebuilt and repainted. For example, after the fire of 1718, the Dormition Cathedral was restored from 1724 to 1731, and the paintings of the Over-the-Gate Church (Troitska nadbramna tserkva) were renewed from 1734 to 1744. One of the best Lavra masters, Alimpiy (Halyk), participated in the exterior paintings of the Troitska Church.

In 1772–1776, Lavra icon painters, along with the most talented apprentices of the workshop, restored the paintings of the Dormition Cathedral. Over five years, more than 40 masters worked on this project, including P. Bolichevsky, S. Harashchenko, S. Horokh, O. Runetsky, H. Teslenko, Ya. Dyachenko, A. Sokolovsky, and others.

From 1860, the workshop was led by the academician A. Rokachevsky.

In the 19th century, the Saint Petersburg Academy of Arts was already operating in Saint Petersburg. In Ukraine, renowned for its artists, the role of such an educational institution was essentially fulfilled by the Lavra icon-painting school. The names of famous artists such as Mykola Murashko and Ivan Yizhakevych are associated with the icon-painting school.

After the major repair of the Church of All Saints in 1906, works on its interior paintings began. Under the guidance of Ivan Yizhakevych, 24 artists participated, 12 of whom were students of the monastery's art school.

During the Soviet era, the workshop declined, and only some of its traditions were maintained in the restoration departments of the historical and cultural reserve established on the Lavra territory in 1926 (now the National Kyiv-Pechersk Historical and Cultural Reserve).

With the restoration of the monastery in 1988, a new stage in the history of the workshop began, and its specialists are currently involved in the restoration of Lavra's churches.

== Icon-painting workshop building ==
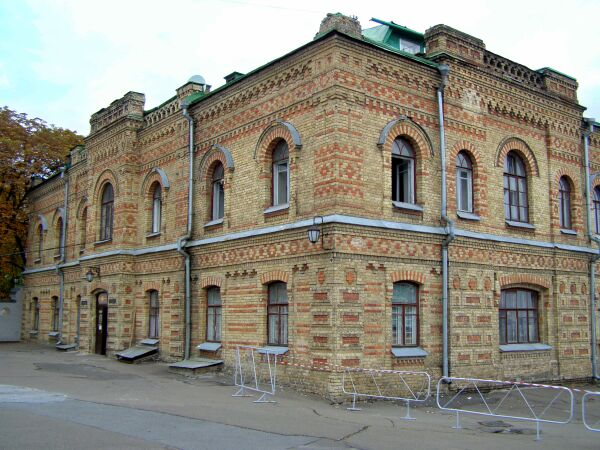

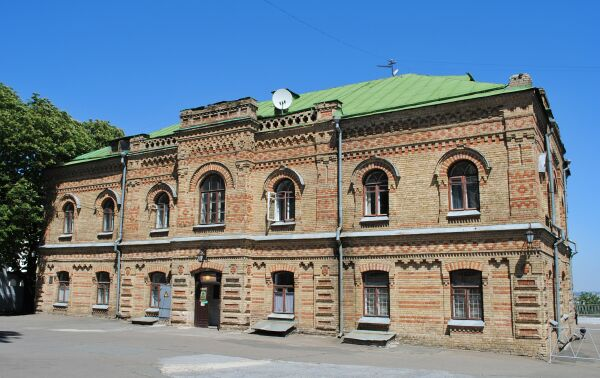

The building of the icon-painting workshop is a 19th-century architectural monument constructed from 1880 to 1883 for the monastery's icon-painting school, designed by the architect V. I. Sychugov.

The building is situated on the upper Lavra plateau behind the Refectory Church. The icon-painting workshops were located on the second floor, while the ground floor housed a storeroom.

After the 1917 Revolution, the building housed the painting school of People's Education of Ukraine.

Currently, the building hosts creative workshops of the National Union of Artists of Ukraine.

The two-story rectangular building is adorned with decorative figured masonry and flat ornamentation in yellow and red brick. The workshop has an attic integrated into the roof structure.

== Icon painters ==
- Alipy Pechersky
- Fedir Aaronsky
- Maxim Buryakovsky
- Alympey Halyk
- Zahariy Holubovsky
- Stepan Horoshenko
- Mykola Danylevsky
- Hrytsko Maliarenko
- Feoktist Pavlovsky
- Petro Rohulia
- Pavlo Tsihovsky
