= Berestove =

Location in Kyiv, Ukraine

Coordinates: 50°26′25″N 30°33′3″E

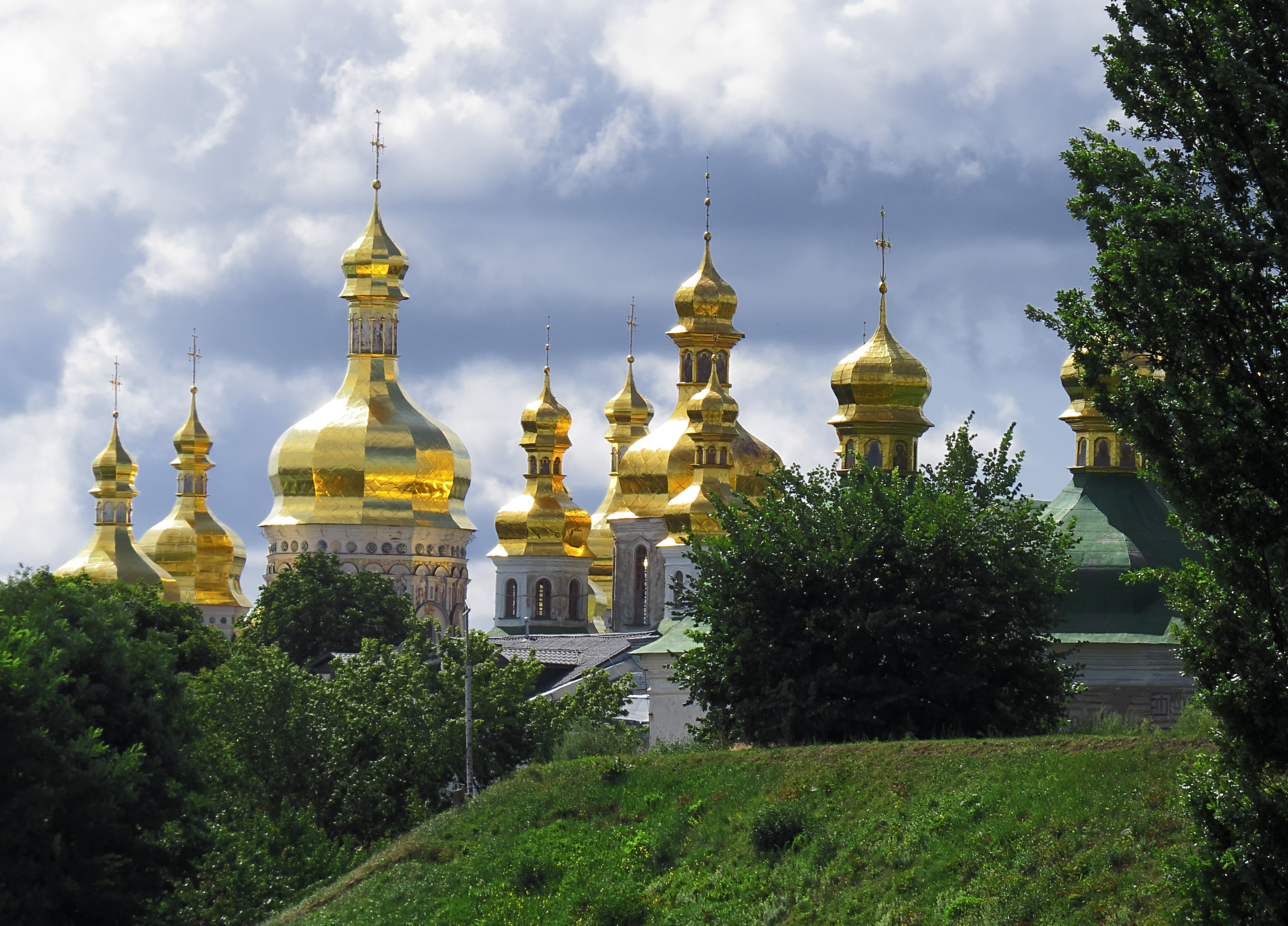
Church of the Saviour at Berestove

Berestove (Ukrainian: Берестове) is a historical location in Kyiv, Ukraine. It is in the Pechersk Raion of the city in the historic Hungarian tract. The location is situated between Lypky, Klov, Zvirynets and the right banks of Dnieper.

In the past it was a princely village of Berestiv to the east from the early city of Kyiv. Today the place is part of the Park of Eternal Glory and upper parts of the Caves monastery of Kyiv (Kyiv Pechersk Lavra).

The name is derived from a local name for the field elm (Berest).

In the village was located a suburban palace of Volodymyr the Great where the Grand Prince died. The palace is mentioned in chronicles of the 10–12th centuries, particularly by Nestor the Chronicler. The palace was made of stone and had two stories. It was surrounded by courtyards princely servants. Many times mentioned in the chronicles "porches"-galleries joined separate buildings into a mansion complex, representing a characteristic part of the princely dwelling.

In the following years Berestiv was inhabited by the Grand Princes Yaroslav the Wise, Sviatoslav II of Kiev, Vsevolod I of Kiev and Vladimir Monomakh. Here were adopted state acts and admitted foreign ambassadors. In 1091 the palace was burnt down by Cumans, but it was rebuilt in 1113. Alas it was not preserved.

The Church of the Saviour at Berestove is listed on UNESCO's World Heritage List. It was first mentioned as part of Saint Saviour monastery that was built around the Church of Saint Apostles (previous name for Church of the Saviour). There were buried Yuri the Long-arm (1157), a daughter of Vladimir Monomakh, Euphimia (1138) and Gleb of Kiev (1171).

Another notable landmark of the place is the Church of Saint Nicholas at the Askold's Grave. It is believed that around here were killed one of the legendary princes of Kyiv Askold and Dir.
