= First City Theatre (Kyiv) =

Theatre in Kyiv, Ukraine, built 1804–1805

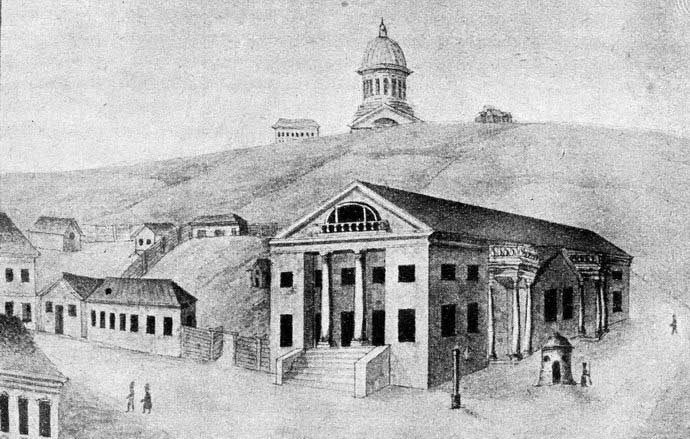
The theatre

The First City Theatre of Kyiv in Ukraine was built in 1804–1805, inaugurated in 1806, and dismantled in 1851. It is known as the first theatre in Kyiv. It was also the first permanent theatre in Ukraine, where the first theatre company had been founded in 1789. The theatre had no permanent staff, but was the locality for theatre companies visiting Kyiv. It was dismantled when the house became too small for the rapidly growing city.

== History ==
The first recorded information about the music library of the National Opera of Ukraine dates back to 1834, when the directorate of the First Permanent City theatre was formed. At that time, the library had 48 opera scores

The transfer of fairs from Dubno to Kyiv in 1797 enabled the city to become a cultural centre for cultural events. Italian opera, and Spanish and Polish ballet companies performed in the city, as well as peasant bands and theatrical groups from Poland, Ukraine, and Russia, which created a need for a permanent venue. The plot was taken at the beginning of Khreshch of that valley. The date of the construction of the first Kyiv Theatre is not known for certain. The historian M. Zakrevsky was in favour it being built in 1806. There is evidence that in 1804 an application was made to the military governor O. P. Tormasov for permission for the building. The surviving governor’s order to the architect A. Melenskyreads: “To the Kyiv city architect, Mr. Court Councilor Melensky, August 26, 1804. Upon the presentation of the local magistrate to me about the desire of some citizens to build a wooden Theatre with their own money, to give my consent to this and approve the plan for it, and tried by the deputy my master General of the Infantry Fensch, I order Our Highness to build it take a place between Pechersk, near the mountain adjacent to old Kiev, in the vicinity of the square called Konna - on the left side of the road leading from Pechersk to Podol”.

== Sources ==
- Bozhko, M. O. (2017). Храм, де народжуються зірки [The temple where the stars are born] (in Ukrainian). Kyiv: Shevchenkiv Central Library.
- Rybakov, M. O. (1997). Unknown and Little-known Pages of the History of Kyiv. Kyiv. pp. 260–272. ISBN 966-7161-15-3.
- Рибаков М. О. Невідомі та маловідомі сторінки історії Києва. — К. : Кий, 1997. — С. 260—272. — ISBN 966-7161-15-3.
