= Odesa Arsenal November Uprising =

November Uprising
- Part of Ukrainian–Soviet War
Date	11–12 December 1917 (O.S. 30 November – 1 December 1917)
Location	Odesa, Ukrainian People's Republic
Result	Ukrainian victory: Re-establishment of Odesa Council
Territorial changes	Ukrainian People's Army recaptures Odesa

Belligerents
Ukrainian People's Republic	(Russian Soviet Federative Socialist Republic) Bolsheviks; Red Guards

Units involved
Haidamaks	Red Guards

Strength
Unknown	300; 1 cruiser Almaz

The Odesa Arsenal November Uprising was an attempt by the Bolsheviks to overthrow the Odesa Council of the Ukrainian People's Republic. It took place on 11–12 December 1917 (O.S. 30 November – 1 December 1917). The result was the capture of the strategic objects of the city by the Ukrainian People's Army.

== Background ==
On 11 December 1917, propaganda spread in Odesa about the disarmament of the workers' Red Guard, created by the local Bolsheviks, by troops of the Ukrainian People's Army. On the same day, 300 Red Guards seized the Odesa train station and the garage of the troops of the Ukrainian People's Republic with 40 armored cars. The rebels tried to involve neutral Serbian units stationed in Odesa for the war on the Romanian front in the uprising. The speech was supported by sailors from the Almaz cruiser, where the headquarters of the rebels was located. An attempt was made to capture the headquarters of the Odessa Military District and the Odesa Council.

In order to counter the Bolshevik uprisings, the Odesa Council recruited the Haydamak detachments. For two days, they fought with the Red Guards in the city centre, as well as in the area of the station and district headquarters. Haydamaks prevented the rebels from taking control of the strategic objects of Odesa. As a result, on 12 December 1917 both sides signed an peace treaty. For reconciliation, a Temporary Joint Committee of Councils was created with the participation of the Odesa Bolshevik Council and the Odesa Ukrainian Council - 3 representatives from each. The Provisional Revolutionary Bureau was also formed from representatives of Rumcherod, the Odesa District headquarters, the Ukrainian Council, and the Commissioner of the Provisional Government.

Subsequently, the troops of the Ukrainian People's Republic brought under their control all important objects of Odesa.
