= Kiev November uprising (1917) =

Bolshevik uprising in Kiev, Ukraine

November Uprising
- Part of Ukrainian–Soviet War
| Date | 11–12 December (O.S. 29–30 November) 1917 |
| Location | Kiev, UPR |
| Result | Ukrainian victory |

Belligerents
| Ukraine | (Russian Soviet Federative Socialist Republic) Bolsheviks |

Commanders and leaders
| Yuriy Kapkan | Georgy Pyatakov |

Strength
| 17,000 soldiers | 6,100 soldiers |

Casualties and losses
| 1 killed, 6 wounded | All captured and disarmed |

The November Uprising was an attempt to overthrow the Ukrainian Central Rada in Kiev by the Bolshevik Kyiv Military Revolutionary Committee. It was planned for the morning of 30 November (12 December) 1917. It ended with the disarmament of Bolshevik units on the night of 29 November (11 December) to 30 November (12 December) by Ukrainian troops. The uprising was part of the Ukrainian–Soviet War and resulted in a Ukrainian victory.

== Description ==
After the proclamation of the UPR, the confrontation between the Central Rada and the Council of People's Commissars of Russia grew rapidly. The Bolsheviks of Kiev agitated against the Ukrainian government. They formed the Kyiv Military Revolutionary Committee, headed by a Bolshevik from Kiev, Georgy Pyatakov, which began preparations for an armed uprising against the Central Rada.

The committee relied on Bolshevik units of the regular army and Red Guard units stationed in Kiev. The uprising was scheduled for the morning of 30 November (12 December) 1917. Using the scenario of the October coup in Petrograd, it was planned to seize the bridges over the Dnieper River, the Arsenal plant, Kiev railway station and the telegraph. The uprising had to be successfully completed before the opening of the All-Ukrainian Congress of Soviets in Kiev, whose decisions the Bolsheviks hoped to consolidate their power.

On the eve of the uprising, the Committee sent an ultimatum to the Central Rada, demanding that the Bolsheviks take over the leadership of Ukraine. The Ukrainian government learned in advance of the uprising and discovered Bolshevik cells in military units. In the evening of 29 November (11 December), the 1st Ukrainian Serdyuk Division under the command of Yurii Kapkan surrounded and disarmed seven thousand soldiers who were about to rebel the next morning.

These were the 3rd and 5th aviation regiments, pontoon and telegraph battalions, the First Reserve Mining Battery and four artillery batteries, the Red Guard of Arsenal and other factories. Overnight, the Bolsheviks lost an entire army with 10 batteries, 200 machine guns, 2 armoured vehicles, 6 aircraft, and 5 million rounds of ammunition. The disarmed Russian soldiers were sent to Russia on trains guarded by Ukrainian troops. Ukrainian soldiers who were going to take part in the Bolshevik uprising were demobilised.

Almost simultaneously, an enlarged 2nd Guards Corps led by Yevheniya Bosch moved from the South-Western Front to Kyiv. The Ukrainian government ordered the dismantling of railway tracks, the blocking of key stations, and the disarming of suspicious military units. Near Zhmerynka, the Bolshevik corps intercepted the 14,000-strong 1st Ukrainian Corps of Lieutenant general Pavlo Skoropadsky, commander of all the troops of the Right Bank of Ukraine, which consisted of 20,000 soldiers and 77 guns. The Bolshevik forces were disarmed and sent to Russia. Other units were disarmed in ten cities of Ukraine. In four more cities, local councils were dissolved for preparing for the uprising.

The independent policy of the Central Rada and its opposition to the Bolsheviks strained relations with the leadership of Soviet Russia. On 4 (17) December 1917, it sent an ultimatum to the Ukrainian government, which became the pretext for the outbreak of the Ukrainian-Soviet war.

== Sources ==
- Калініченко В. В., Рибалка І. К. Історія України. Ч. ІІІ : 1917—2003 рр. : Підручник для історичних факультетів вищих навчальних закладів. — Харків: ХНУ ім. В. Н. Каразіна, 2004. (in Ukrainian)
- Савченко В. А. Двенадцать войн за Украину. — Харьков: Фолио, 2006. (in Russian)
- https://www.istpravda.com.ua/articles/2012/09/5/93220/
