= Ivan Kushchnyk Tower, Kyiv Pechersk Lavra =

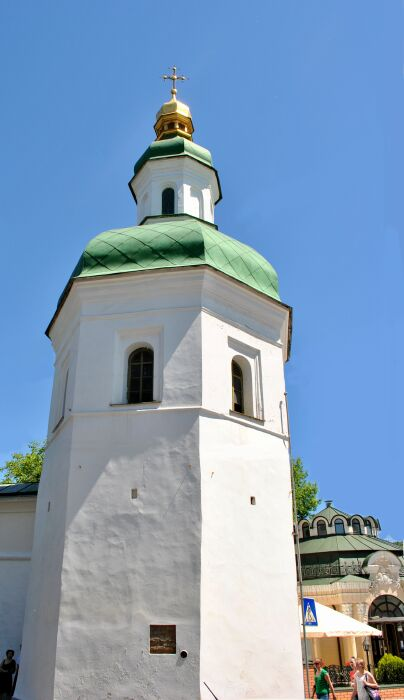
- Ivan Kushchnyk Tower
- Interactive map of Ivan Kushchnyk Tower, Kyiv Pechersk Lavra

Immovable Monument of National Significance of Ukraine
- Official name: Башта Івана Кущника (Часова) (Tower of Ivan Kushchnyk (Clock Tower))
- Type: Architecture
- Reference no.: 260088/16

Ivan Kushchnyk Tower (Ukrainian: Вежа Іоанна Кущника; Russian: Башня Иоанна Кущника) is a defensive tower with a church, part of the Kyiv Pechersk Lavra fortifications, Kyiv, Ukraine.

== Name ==
A small church built into the defensive tower was consecrated in the memory of Saint John Calybite, who lived in 5th century in Bethany and was considered a saint patron of Hetman Ivan Samoylovych.

== Description ==
The tower is irregular-octagonal in plan, elongated in east-west direction. It is built from brick, covered in white plaster and decorated with profiled cornice. The tower has three stories covered with tinned cupola and gilded cross on top. Ceilings of the ground and the first floors were originally wooden, but were later replaced by stone, thus increasing tower fire resistance. The tower height from the ground to the tip of the cross is 25 meters, its other dimensions decrease with height being 9,0 x 7,3 meters at the ground level and 8,5 x 7,0 meters on the first floor level. Octagonal walls have windows for shotguns and small cannons. The tower had a gallery on the monastery side, supported by wooden consoles connected to the general system of defensive walls. The upper tier of the tower has semicircular window openings. The structure is built in a Kyiv style of Ukrainian Baroque.

== History ==
The tower was built between 1696 and 1701. It was heavily damaged by the great Lavra fire of 1718. Historic documents state that three towers with churches, among them the Ivan Kushchnyk Tower, were set to be renovated in 1721, along other restorations of Lavra, but the plan was not realized until 1797. However, there was some maintenance before that – in 1785 the tower received a tin roof.

In 1918, the tower was damaged again – this time from the explosion at Zvirynets, then repaired the same year. Major renovations in the 20th century were done in 1953 and in 1972. The last one was carried out under supervision of art historian V. Pidgora and architect A. Kulagin. During that renovation the lower walls and vaults of the tower were strengthened, the windows of the top floor and tier under cupola were reopened, and the cross re-gilded.

In the night on 15 June 2026 dome of the tower was stripped off by Russian drone during mass attack on Kyiv.

== See also ==
- Pechersk Lavra fortification
- Ukrainian architecture
- Ukrainian Baroque
