= Fedir Aaronsky =

Ukrainian artist (1742–1825)

- Фе́дір Іва́нович Ааро́нський
- Born: 1742; Khyttsi, Sencha Hromada, Cossack Hetmanate (modern Ukraine)
- Died: 24 August 1825 (aged 82–83); Kiev, Russian Empire
- Style: icon painting, Painting

Fedir Ivanovych Aaronsky (Фе́дір Іва́нович Ааро́нський) (around 1742, Hittsi Synetski, Hetmanate (now Hittsi, Lubny Raion, Poltava Oblast) — August 24, 1825, Kyiv) — Ukrainian painter, finift enamel artist, icon painter. In monastic life (from 1802) — Feodosiy.

== Works ==
- Portraits of Catherine I, Dmitry Rostovsky, Alexander Nevsky.
- Icons:
  - "Assumption of the Virgin,"
  - "Guardian Angels"
  - "Christ with a Crown of Thorns"
- Finift works:
  - a stand for the Gospel of the Church of Mykola Dobrogo (Kyiv; preserved in the Museum of Historical Treasures of Ukraine);
  - 8 decorations for the works of F. Sorokin (1789);
  - 4 medallions for an icon (1800);
  - decorations for a small altarpiece Gospel (frame by S. Rostovsky) and Apostle and Gospel (frame by Samson Strelbitsky; all — 1801). The Lavra presented the last two editions to Empress Yelizaveta Oleksiyivna and Emperor Alexander I.

After Aaronsky's death, 70 unfinished paintings and 83 finift works were left.
