= Pechersk Lavra fortification =

Fortification system of the Kyiv Pechersk Lavra in Ukraine

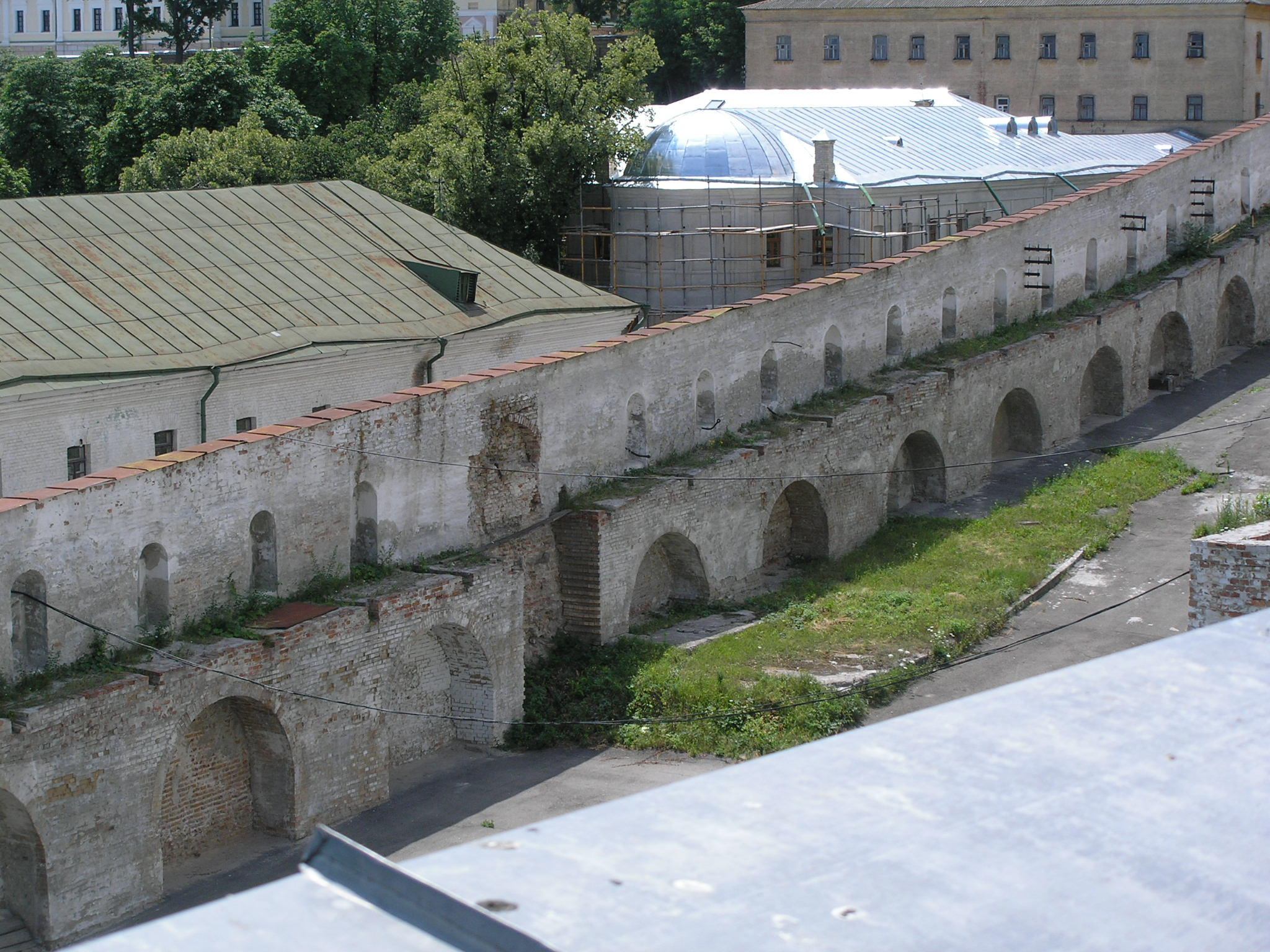
- Lavra fortification walls seen from above

Immovable Monument of National Significance of Ukraine
- Official name: Монастирські мури (Monastery walls)
- Type: Urban Planning, Architecture
- Reference no.: 260088/14

The Lavra fortification (Ukrainian: Лаврські фортифікаційні споруди, romanized: Lavrs’ki fortyfikatsiini sporudy; Russian: Лаврские фортификационные укрепления, romanized: Lavrskie fortifikatsionnye ukrepleniya) is a system of walls, towers, and other constructions built for the protection of the Cave Monastery in Kyiv, the capital of Ukraine.

== History ==
The fortification around the monastery first arose at the end of the 12th century, when a 2-metre-wide, 5-metre-high stone wall was erected. This wall was destroyed during the Mongol invasion of Rus' and was excavated by archaeologists in 1951. After the Mongol invasion, the monastery was defended by wooden walls. In 1679, Hetman Ivan Samoylovych had a moat and new ramparts added to the fortification around the "upper monastery".

Hetman Ivan Mazepa financed the fortification's construction at the height of the Great Northern War and had a thick stone wall with four towers added for protection of the monastery in case of a Swedish attack. The total length of the walls was 1,090 m (3,580 ft), thickness 3 m (9.8 ft), and height 7 m (23 ft). The fort had three gates: Holy Gates with the Trinity Gate Church, Economy Gates with the All Saints Church, and Southern Gates or Caves Gates. There were also four towers: Ivan Kushchnyk Tower, Onufriy Tower, Painter Tower, and Clock Tower.

In 1706, Tsar Peter I ordered the construction of the so-called "Old Cave Fortress". The earliest plans for the fortress were drawn up by an engineer named Gellert. It was completed in 1723 and consisted of a semicircular citadel with a 6-metre-high earthen rampart, eight bulwarks, and other fortifications. The new fortress had an arsenal of 467 artillery guns, 27 mortars, and 3 howitzers.

During the 18th and 19th centuries, the fortress was rebuilt again, particularly around the near and far caves. The new project was created by Otto von Freiman and carried out by Lieutenant Colonel Burman. The new walls were 1,039 m (3,409 ft) in length, three and a half bricks thick, and 4 m (13 ft) high with a brick foundation 1.5 m (4.9 ft) deep. During that time, the Old Cave Fortress constructed in the 18th century was the base for the administrative and military institutions of the Russian Empire in the city.

In 1996, Ivan Mazepa's coat of arms, which had been removed following the anathema laid upon him on the order of Peter I of Russia, was restored on the façade of All Saints Church.

== Constructions ==
The fortification consisted of a total of four towers:

- the Southwest Tower, also called the tower of Ivan Kushchnik, taken from the name of the church that was supposed to be constructed in the tower but was not built;
- the South Tower, or the Horologium, also called the Clock Tower, because it had an installed clock up to 1818;
- the North Tower, also called the Painting Tower, because it once held a painting studio;
- and the East Tower containing the church of Saint Onufry, also called the Chamber Tower because at one time it contained Hetman Mazepa's chambers.

Near the North Tower, there is a water tower, which is not part of the Lavra fortification system. It was designed by the architect V. Sychugov and constructed to ensure the Lavra's fresh water supply in 1879.
