= Contracts House =

Trade building in Kyiv, Ukraine

Coordinates: 50.465311°N 30.517603°E

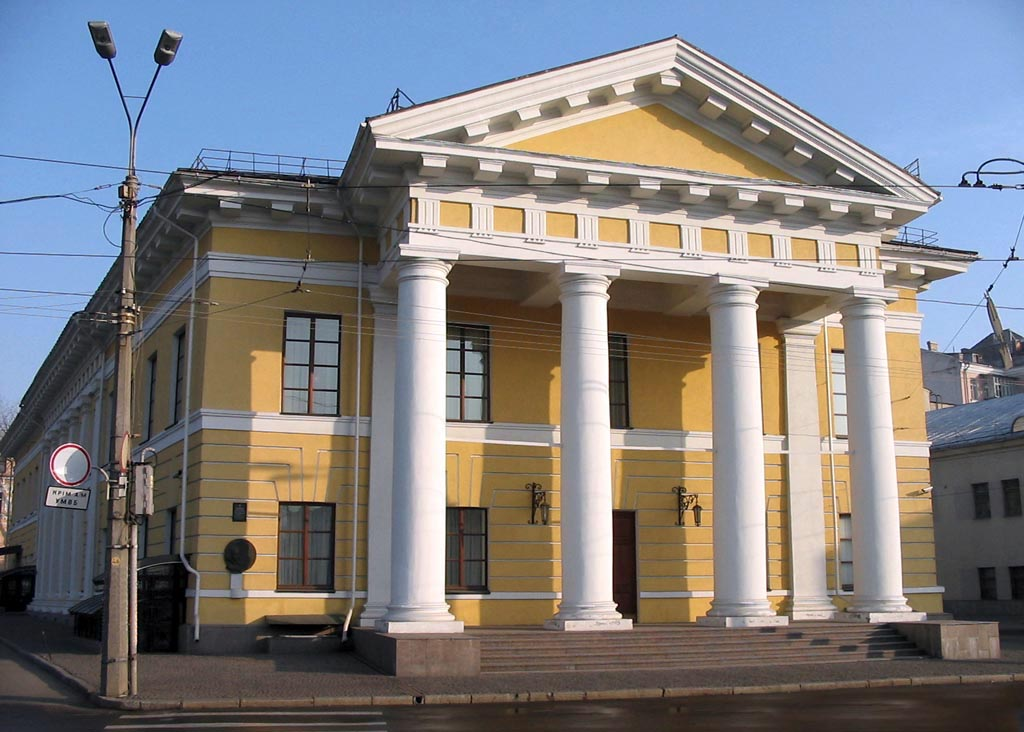
The front façade of the Contracts House featured four Doric order columns, topped off with a triangular-shaped roof.

The Contracts House (Ukrainian: Контрактовий будинок, romanized: Kontraktovyi budynok) is a trade building in the Podil neighborhood of Kyiv, the capital of Ukraine. The Contracts House received its name because the city's contracts were signed there. It is located on the Kontraktova Square, once one of the Podil's main trading centers. The building is considered one of the important Classical architecture constructions of the city.

== History ==
After a large fire destroyed part of the Podil in 1811, the first Contracts House in the neighborhood burnt down. A new replacement building was constructed in 1815–1817 in the Classical style according to a plan made by English architect V. Geste, supervised by architect Andrey Melensky.

The Contracts House was envisioned as part of an ensemble, which would include the post office, the magistrate's quarters, and the building itself. However, only the Contracts House was constructed. The front and western façades of the building features Doric order columns, and the eastern—Ionic order columns located on a portico. The front façade is topped off with a triangular pediment.

The building has a total of two floors, with the second floor used as a concert hall, containing a row of colonnades. All rooms in the building were done without any special decoration, with the exception of rooms on the upper floor, which were decorated on the order of Melensky. Since the time of its construction, the interior plan of the building has changed.

Although built as a contracts house, the building was not entirely used for this purpose; it was sometimes used as a concert hall. Famous personalities visited or used the Contracts House: writers Alexander Pushkin, Nikolai Gogol, and Honoré de Balzac, poets Taras Shevchenko, Adam Mickiewicz, and Denis Davydov.

After 1917, Trading Academy and Trade Museum were located in the premises of the Contracts House, and later - various technical schools. When interior furniture was renovated, the furniture for the building was developed by an architect I. Karakis.

Since the mid-1990s Ukrainian Interbank Currency Exchange is operating in the Contracts House, organized with a great contribution made by famous Ukrainian economist Vadym Hetman.

== Bibliography ==
- Yunakov, Oleg (2016). Architect Joseph Karakis (in Russian). Almaz. ISBN 978-1-68082-000-3.
