= Andrey Melensky =

Russian architect

Andrey Ivanovich Melensky (Russian: Андрей Иванович Меленский; 1766–1833) was a Russian Imperial Neoclassical architect from Moscow who was appointed the city architect of Kiev (now Kyiv, Ukraine) in 1799, and held the post for some thirty years.

Melensky began his career as an assistant to Matvey Kazakov, Vasily Bazhenov, and Giacomo Quarenghi and was involved in the construction of the Catherine Palace on the Yauza River. He was put in charge of the reconstruction of Podil after the great 1811 fire, and succeeded in remodeling the district in a provincial Palladian style. Melensky was the first architect to be given the position of City Architect of Kiev.

== Major commissions ==
- Contracts House
- Magdeburg Rights Column
- Church of St. Nicholas, Podil
- Nativity Church, Podil
- Holy Cross Church, Podil
- Askold Grave Church
- Resurrection Church at the Florivsky Convent
- Reconstruction of the Podil Gostiny Dvor
- Old building of the city theatre
- Old House of Nobility
- Pechersk wooden synagogue
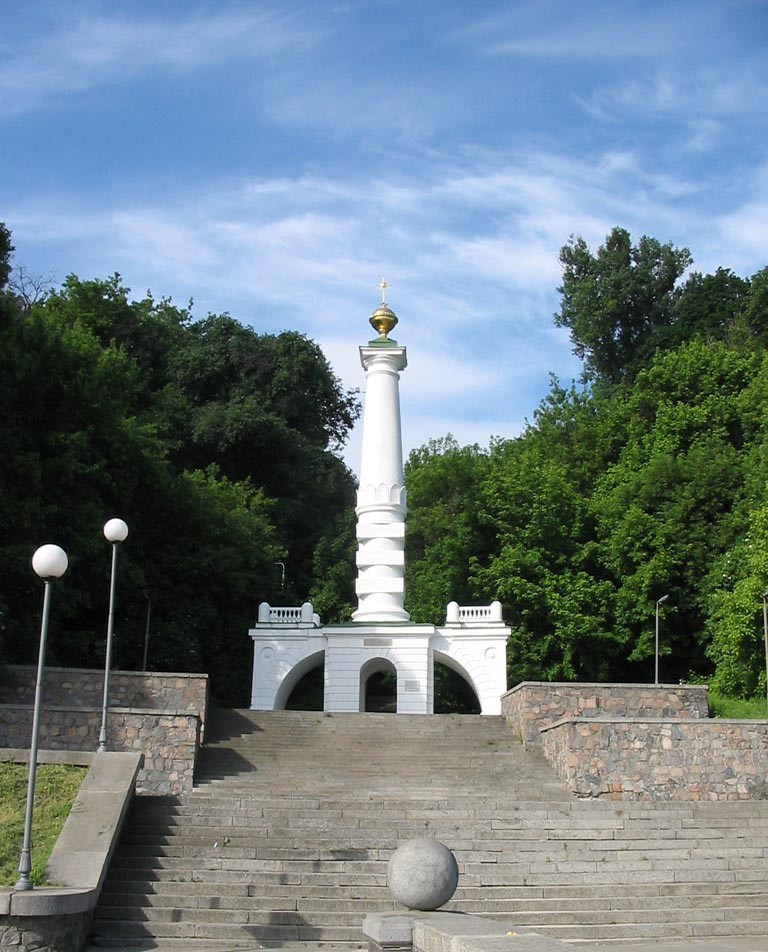
Magdeburg Rights Column

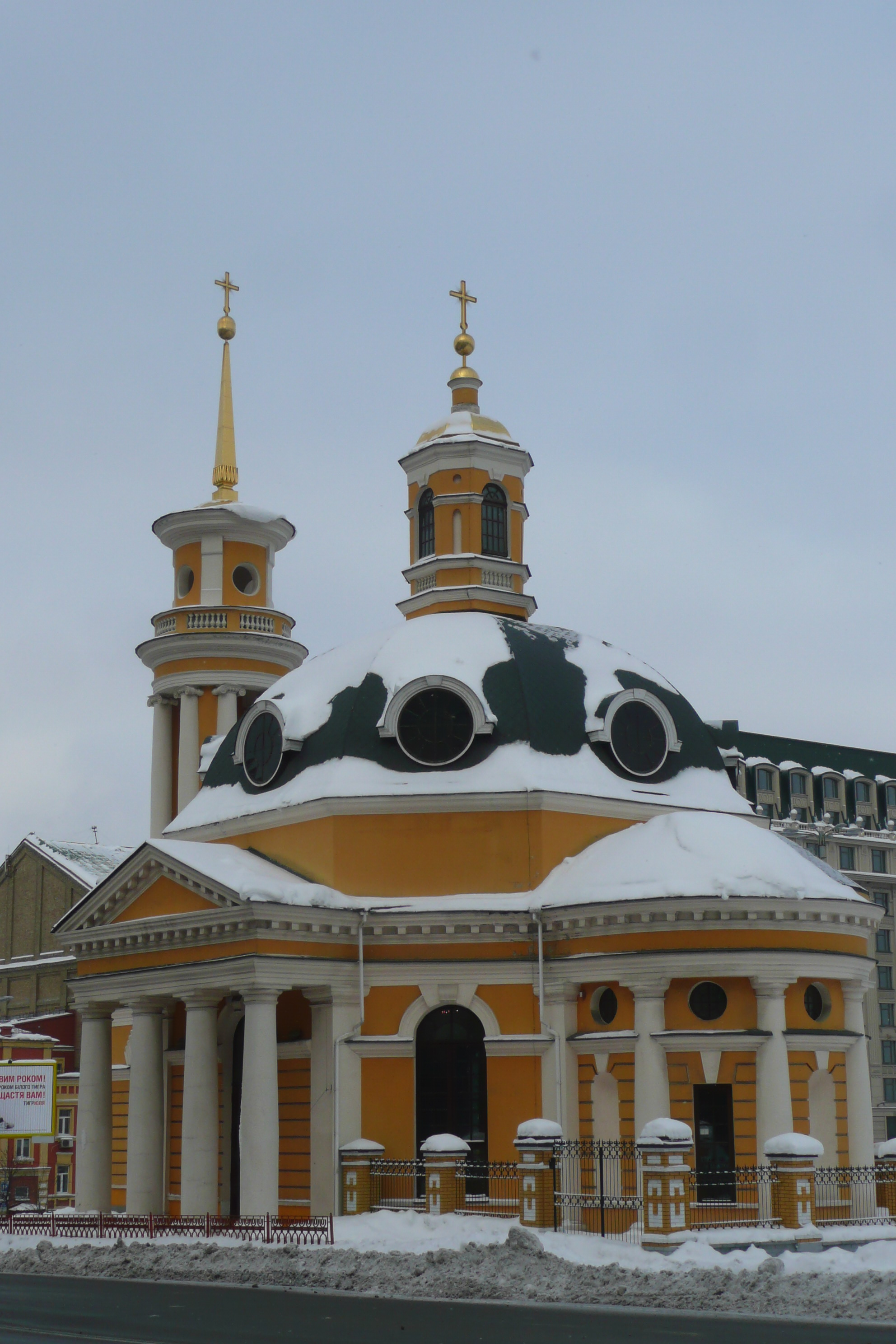
Nativity Church

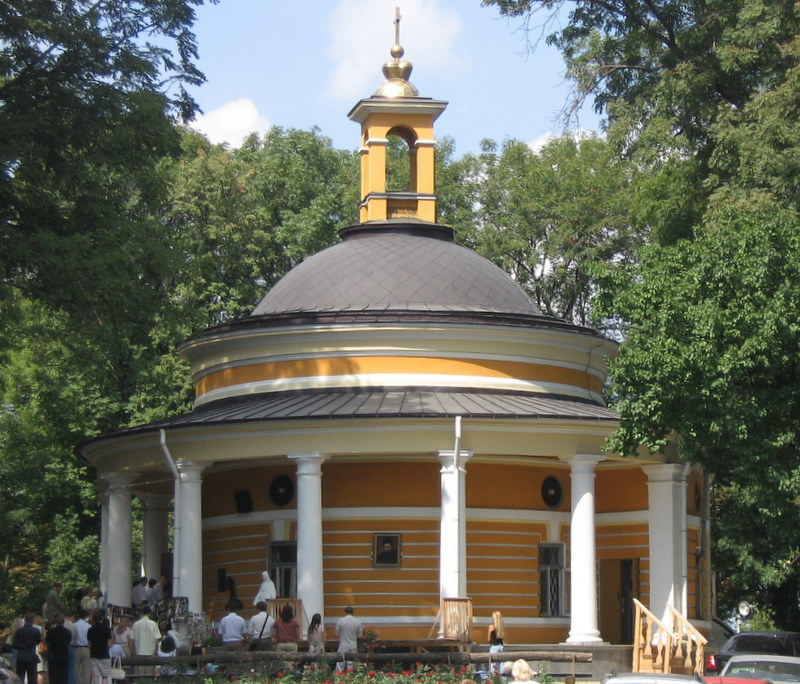
Askold's Grave Church

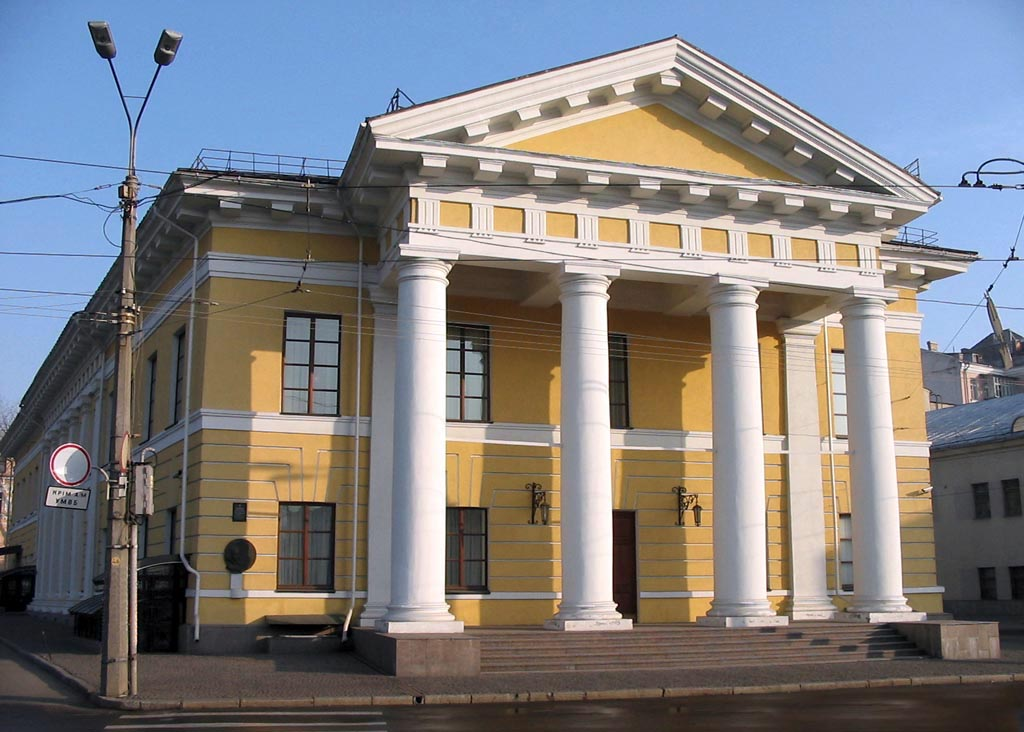
The Contract House

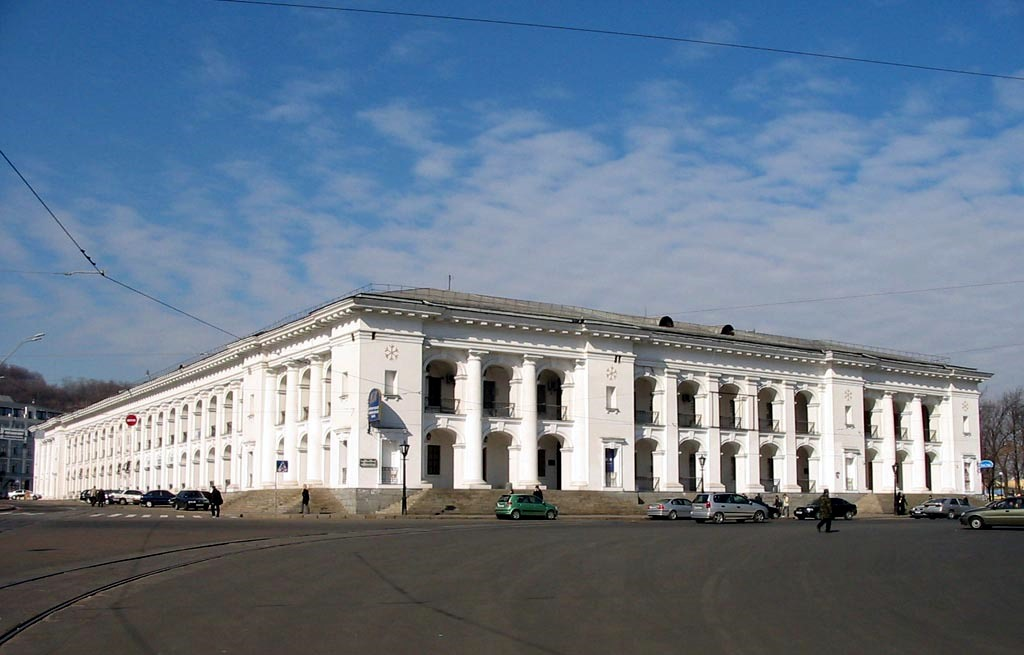
Gostiny Dvor
