= KyivNotKiev =

Ukrainian naming reform

Campaign logo

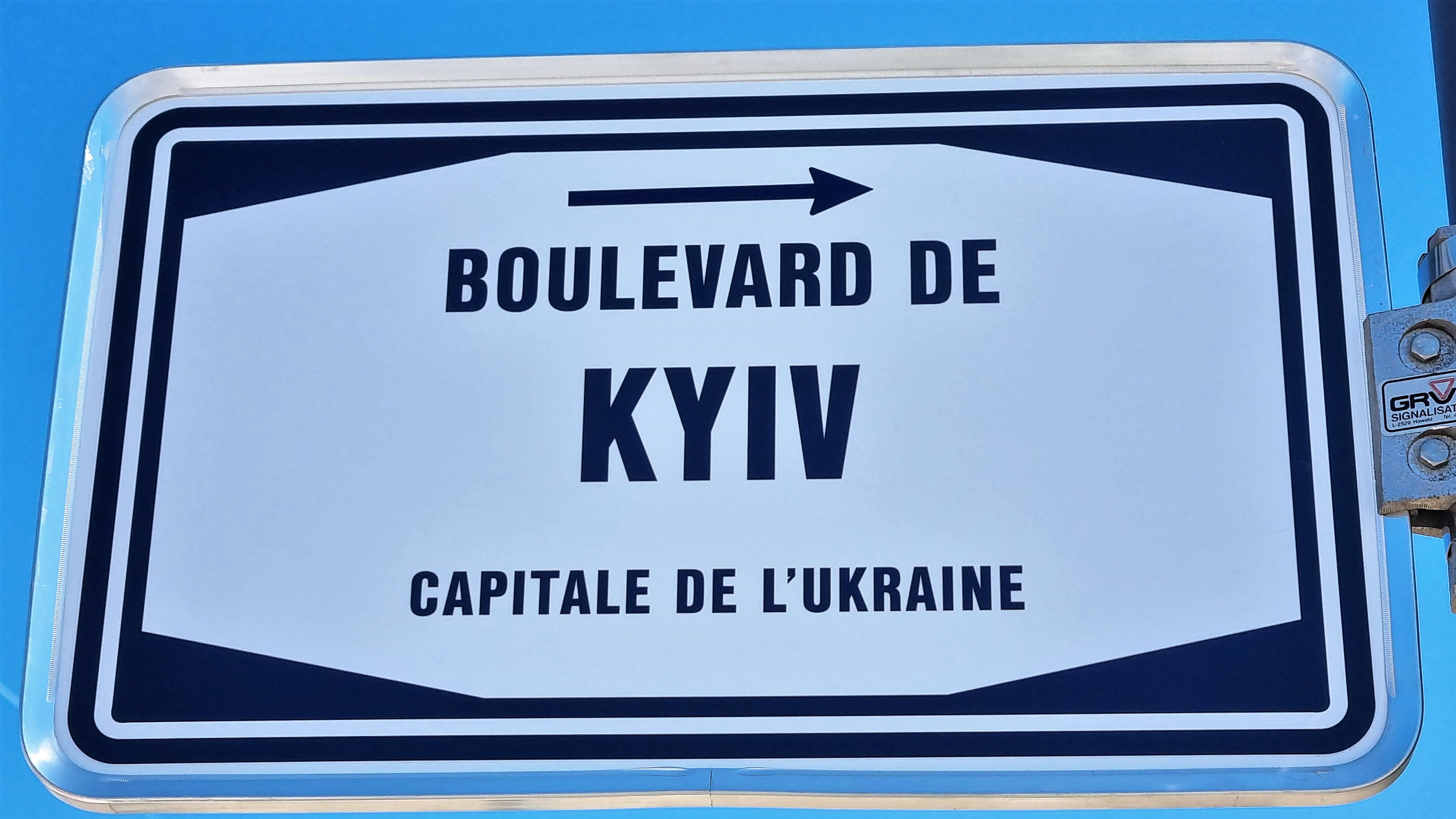
Boulevard de Kiev in Luxembourg City, renamed "Boulevard de Kyiv" in July 2022

KyivNotKiev is an online campaign to persuade English-language media and organisations exclusively to use Kyiv (derived from the Ukrainian-language 'Київ') instead of Kiev (derived from the Russian-language 'Киев') as the name of the Ukrainian capital. It was started on 2 October 2018 by the Ukrainian Ministry of Foreign Affairs (MFA) and StratCom Ukraine, and it is run by the MFA's Department of Public Diplomacy.

It is part of the wider CorrectUA campaign, which intends internationally to assert a Ukrainian identity and remove linguistic relics of the Russian Empire and Soviet Union by promoting the exclusive use of Ukrainian-language transliterations for Ukrainian place names.

== CorrectUA campaign in English ==
The CorrectUA campaign lobbies for changes to Ukrainian city names whose English names are derived from their Russian spellings. Examples of Russian and Ukrainian spelling differences include Odessa and Odesa, Kharkov and Kharkiv, Lvov and Lviv, Nikolaev and Mykolaiv, and Rovno and Rivne.

The campaign also advises against using the definite article "the" before the name of the country, i.e. "the Ukraine". The definite article is rarely found before the names of independent states, most stemming from the name either being a compound of a noun and an adjective or from a geographical region. For Ukraine, the addition of "the" is hypothesized either to derive from its time as the Ukrainian Soviet Socialist Republic (compare with 'the Russian Federation') or due to the word "Ukraine" being derived from "borderland", and "the Ukraine" meaning "the borderlands" (compare with 'The Netherlands'). Many Ukrainians regard the use of "the Ukraine" as questioning Ukrainian sovereignty, especially after the beginning of the Russian military occupation of parts of Ukraine beginning in 2014.

Critics have argued that the campaign is populistic and was started to divert attention from more important problems.

=== KyivNotKiev campaign ===
==== Spelling of Kyiv prior to KyivNotKiev ====
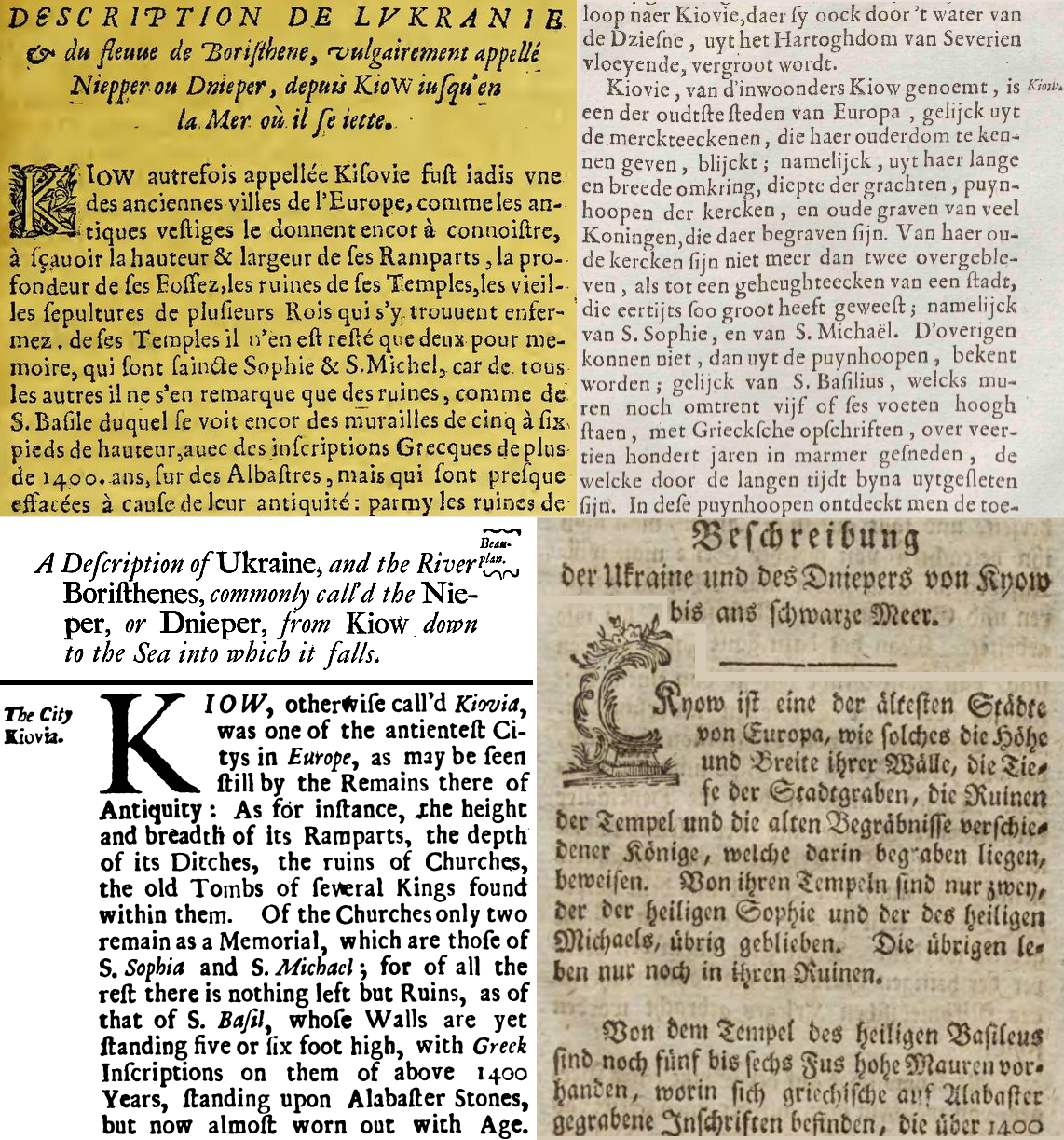
In Beauplan's Description of Ukraine, the city was spelled Kiow (from the Polish Kijów) in three language editions: French (Rouen 1660), Dutch (Amsterdam 1664), and English (London 1704). In German, it became Kyow (Wrocław 1780).

In English, Kiev was used in print as early as 1804 in John Cary's "New map of Europe, from the latest authorities" which appeared in Cary's New Universal Atlas published in London, as well as in Mary Holderness's travelogue New Russia: Journey from Riga to the Crimea by way of Kiev, published in 1823. The Oxford English Dictionary included Kiev in a quotation by 1883, and Kyiv in 2018. Transliterations based on Russian names became common practice because of aggressive Russification policies from the Russian Imperial and later Soviet governments.

The transliteration Kyiv was legally mandated by the Ukrainian government in 1995. The transliteration was approved by the Tenth United Nations Conference on Standardisation of Geographical Names in 2012, but did not catch on internationally. Prior to 2019, there were few cases of organisations switching to the "Kyiv" spelling. After the Russo-Ukrainian War began in 2014, some Western media outlets opted to switch spellings.

==== Origin of the campaign ====
The "KyivNotKiev" campaign began with a fortnight-long "marathon". Every one or two days, the MFA published the title of foreign news outlets; on social media, Ukrainians would ask them to use Kyiv instead of Kiev. Ukrainian social media users also added "#KyivNotKiev" frames to their avatars. According to the MFA, ten of the most influential English-language global news outlets were affected: Reuters, CNN, BBC News, Al Jazeera, Daily Mail, The Washington Post, The New York Times, The Guardian, The Wall Street Journal and Euronews. Among the top Ukrainian officials who took part were Minister of Healthcare, Ulana Suprun; Representative of Ukraine at the Council of Europe, Dmytro Kuleba; and the Member of the Verkhovna Rada, Yehor Soboliev. Thousands of Ukrainians participated, and the hashtag "#KyivNotKiev" was seen by more than 10 million social media users. During or shortly after the marathon, the BBC and The Guardian started using Kyiv. Later, the campaign shifted its attention to foreign airports, which used Kiev almost exclusively. In April 2019, Brussels Airport switched to Kyiv in response to the campaign.

==== Results of the campaign ====
After the campaign began, the name Kyiv became more common on English-speaking outlets including the BBC, The Guardian, Associated Press, The Wall Street Journal, The Globe and Mail, The Washington Post, Financial Times, The Economist, The Daily Telegraph, and The New York Times.

In June 2019, at the request of the United States Department of State, the Embassy of Ukraine to the United States, and Ukrainian organisations in America, the name Kyiv was officially adopted by the United States Board on Geographic Names as the only correct name, resulting in the federal government of the United States solely using 'Kyiv'. Before that, both names were used.

One of the objectives of the campaign was to convince international airports to switch from Kiev to Kyiv. Previously, most airports refused to do so, saying that Kiev was specified by the International Air Transport Association (IATA) and International Civil Aviation Organization (ICAO). However, in October 2019, IATA switched to Kyiv, following the decision of the US Board on Geographic Names. Since the campaign's launch, 63 airports and 3 airlines worldwide (as of January 2020) have begun using the name Kyiv, even before it was adopted by IATA. Among them were Toronto Pearson, Luton, Manchester, Frankfurt, and Josep Tarradellas Barcelona–El Prat.

In September 2020, the English Wikipedia switched from using Kiev to Kyiv.

== In Chinese ==
=== In Traditional Chinese ===
Taiwan, which uses Traditional Chinese, began using Ukrainian-derived transliterations from 24 March 2022. For example, the National Academy for Educational Research of Taiwan updated its preferred transliteration to Kharkiv 哈爾基夫, Hāěrjīfū on 24 March, Luhansk 盧漢斯克, Lúhànsīkè on 14 April, and Zaporizhzhia 札波利扎, Zhábōlìzhā on 10 June. Both Kyiv and Kiev are transliterated as 基輔, Jīfǔ.

=== In Simplified Chinese ===
Similarly, the United Nations switched to Ukrainian-derived transliterations in its official Simplified Chinese version. For example, when condemning the recognition of the Donetsk and Luhansk People's Republics, it used the Russian-derived 卢甘斯克, Lúgānsīkè on 25 February 2022 but the Ukrainian-derived 卢汉斯克, Lúhànsīkè on 2 March. When condemning the annexations on 30 September and 12 October, it both used the Ukrainian-derived 扎波里日亚, Zhābōlǐrìyà for Zaporizhzhia and 卢汉斯克, Lúhànsīkè for Luhansk.

== In Dutch ==
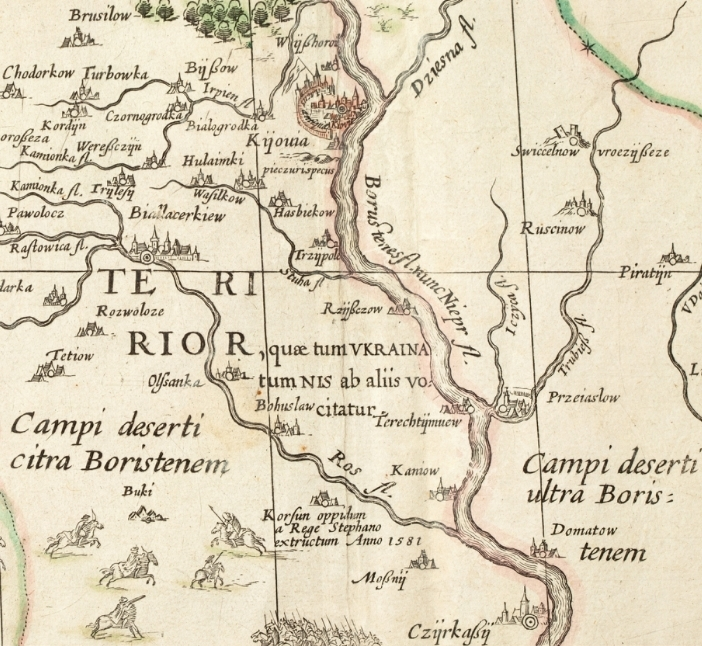
Kyiv is mentioned as Kijovia, a Latinisation of Polish Kijów, in this fragment of the 1613 Latin Radziwiłł map, the oldest-known map mentioning Ukraine (as "Vkraina"), printed by Dutchman Willem Blaeu in Amsterdam.

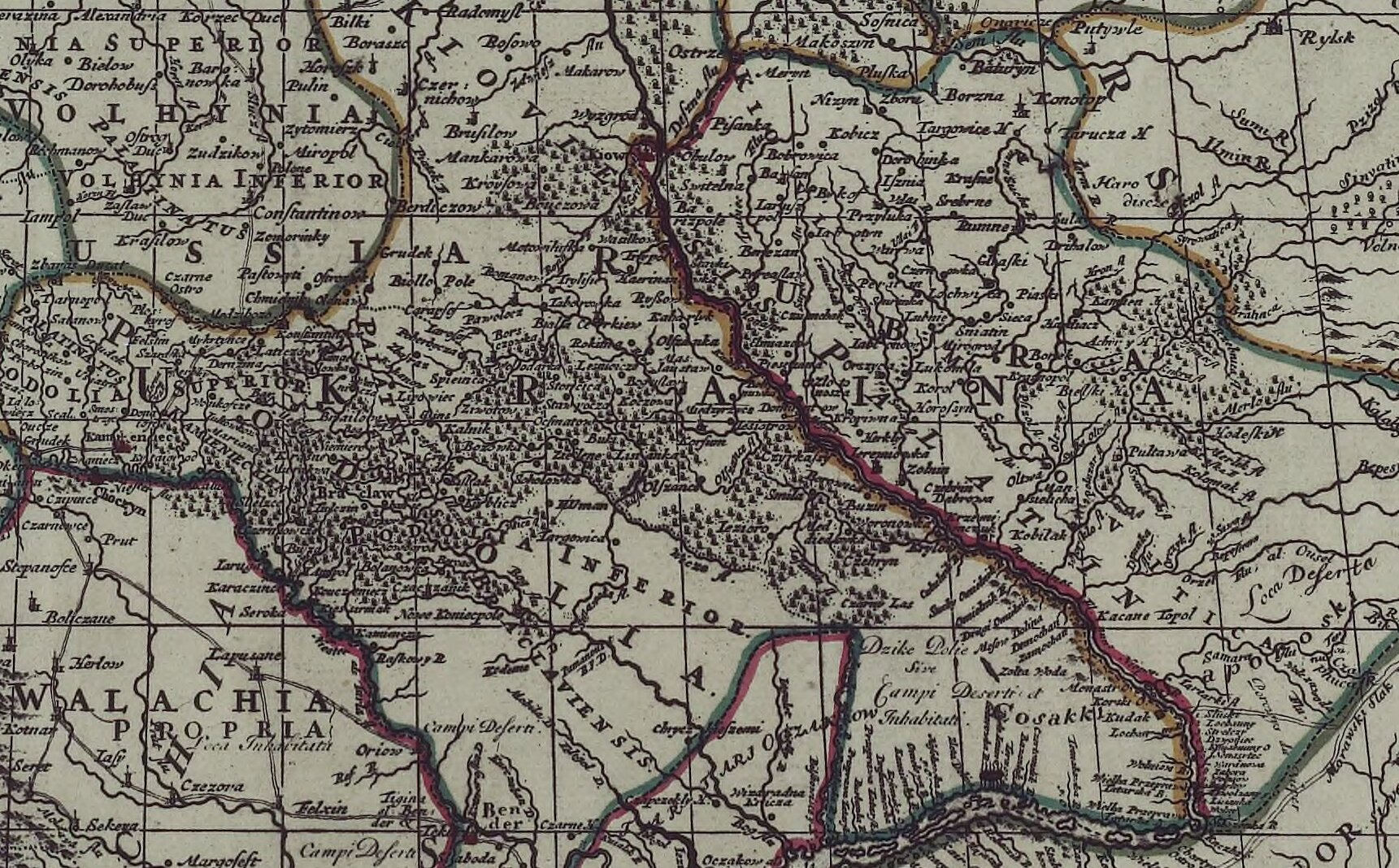
In 1710, Dutch cartographer Abraham Allard named the city Kiow, the surrounding region Kiovia, and the Kiev Voivodeship Kioviensis Palatinatus.

From 1660 to 1950, the German-derived name Kiew was the city's standard spelling in the Dutch language; it was only after that that the Russian-derived Kiev came into common usage.

In October 2018, Dutch weekly news magazine De Groene Amsterdammer cautiously welcomed the #KyivNotKiev campaign, arguing that it might take some time, but that Kyiv would win out eventually. Shortly after the 24 February 2022 Russian invasion of Ukraine, public news service VRT NWS of Flanders, the Dutch-speaking northern region of Belgium, published an article on 28 February defending the use of Kiev rather than Kyiv, citing common usage and knowledge, arguing on linguistic grounds that Kiev is "not 100% Russian" but the localised Dutch version of the Russian name, referring to other exonyms, noting the #KyivNotKiev campaign prompted many English-language media to switch, and some media in the Netherlands had done so as well since 24 February, but that VRT would not do so for the time being.

=== de Volkskrant decision ===
On 1 March 2022, de Volkskrant became the first newspaper in the Netherlands to switch to Kyiv, citing major English-language media that had already switched, as well as the Foreign Affairs Ministry of the Netherlands, feedback from readers, that it "already used Lviv (rather than the Russian Lvov)", and "that any country which, after a period of oppression, chooses freedom and wishes to mark this by using place names and country names in its own language, deserves our support." Other media in the Netherlands noted de Volkskrant's decision, but did not switch themselves, with the public news service NOS stating on 7 March 2022 their reasons for following the Dutch Language Union's recommendations, followed by Trouw. The influential Genootschap Onze Taal took no side, saying Kiev, Kyjiv and Kyiv were all correct and commonly used in Dutch, pointing to an April 2022 article by linguist Nicoline van der Sijs, who encouraged readers to make their own choice, and as a guide use Transcriptor.nl (which she co-developed with Radboud University Nijmegen, commissioned by the Language Union). Flemish regional newspaper Gazet van Antwerpen did switch to Kyiv on 5 May 2022, citing #KyivNotKiev, English-language media and de Volkskrant as examples, arguing why the change "does not mean we are slavishly doing whatever the Ukrainian government is asking of us", but rather a humanitarian statement in solidarity with the Ukrainian people, Ukrainian fellow journalists, as well as Ukrainian refugees who had been given refuge in Antwerp's Linkeroever and effectively become part of society; uniquely, the Gazet repeated its statement in the Ukrainian language. Meanwhile, the Dutch government began using Kyiv in its diplomatic communications on Ukraine as early as 10 May 2022.

On 8 July 2022, the Dutch Language Union added Kyiv (alongside Kiev) as an option in its Foreign Geographical Names directory, with the explanation "Local name, which has become increasingly common in the Netherlands since 2022." A commission member later commented that Kyiv is an example of a relatively new toponym that may be added as an alternative once it enters into common parlance, but an established name like Kiev would not be removed from the list until it effectively falls into disuse. Team Taaladvies of the Flemish government still favours Kiev as the commonly accepted name in Dutch, but (as of March 2026) similarly notes: "The international transliteration of the Ukrainian name (Київ) recommended by the United Nations is Kyiv. This spelling has been increasingly used in the Netherlands since 2022."

Otherwise, de Volkskrant initially remained fairly isolated in its decision until on 13 October 2022, De Groene's editorial board formally stated that "De Groene chooses Kyiv", citing the #KyivNotKiev campaign, major English-language media and de Volkskrant that had already switched, De Groene's earlier choice to switch to Belarus instead of Wit-Rusland (literally "White Russia"), the fact that their readers had urged them to switch, and that despite Kiev being the better-known spelling, actively maintaining it or postponing the decision was a wrong, implicitly pro-Kremlin choice.

=== 2023 NOS-led shift ===
On 25 January 2023, Trouw evolved its earlier policy, announcing that it would switch to most Ukrainian endonyms, such as Volodymyr Zelensky rather than Volodimir Zelenski, as well as Belarus instead of Wit-Rusland, pointing out that it had previously switched to Lviv and from Tsjernobil to Tsjernobyl; but Kiev would still remain an exception to these new rules, adding that "it caused – admittedly – most discussion at the editorial office". A similar case-by-case approach was taken by Flemish newspaper De Standaard, arguing in December 2022 why it kept Kiev, but was willing to shift on Ukrainian names if users of the Dutch language did so.

The major shift happened after NOS amended its earlier position on 20 February 2023: based on rapidly changing usage in the Dutch language in the invasion's first year, almost all Ukrainian toponyms such as Kyiv, Charkiv (Kharkiv) and Odesa would henceforth in principle be spelt according to the Ukrainian endonyms, with very few exceptions such as Tsjernobyl rather than Tsjornobyl for Chornobyl, Krim rather than Krym for Crimea, and Dnjepr rather than Dnipro for the river Dnieper. Major newspaper NRC followed suit two days later, after lengthy internal discussions and feedback from readers (although it maintained Wit-Rusland for Belarus). The Amsterdam-based newspaper Het Parool announced the switch to Kyiv and other Ukrainian names in a footnote on 22 March 2023, citing 'various other media' that had made the switch since the war broke out, adding that spelling in articles previously published online would not be retroactively changed. By early 2024, Trouw had quietly dropped its Kiev exception, and shifted to Kyiv. Following the evolving recommendations of the Dutch Language Union and Team Taaladvies (the latter of which was increasingly relying on Transcriptor.nl), De Standaard switched several more Ukrainian toponyms in the summer of 2024, including from Charkov to Charkiv and from Volodimir Zelenski to Volodymyr Zelensky; yet, Kiev, Odessa, Tsjernobyl and Dnjepr remained amongst the "now very small set of exceptions" to the rule.

In January 2025, cartographer Barend Köbben, a member of the Commission on Geographical Names of the Dutch Language Union, explained: "[I]nternationally, there are no rules; nothing has been legally established. (...) For example, nowadays we recommend spelling Kyiv in the Ukrainian way rather than the Russian way with 'i-e'. But this is merely a recommendation and is not set in stone anywhere."

Several news outlets in Flanders, such as Het Laatste Nieuws, De Morgen, Het Nieuwsblad, and Het Belang van Limburg (as well as the English-language version of VRT NWS during 2019-2021) as of March 2026 have no stated or apparent spelling policy on the Ukrainian capital; they use Kiev and Kyiv interchangeably, sometimes within the same article. Typically, Kiev still dominates as the city's name, whereas Kyiv is increasingly used in this sense, but especially when citing The Kyiv Independent, the Kyiv Post or the Kyiv School of Economics as a source, or when reporting on FC Dynamo Kyiv.

== In German ==
As late as 2014, German news agencies agreed to continue using the Russian-derived German exonym Kiew. Following the 24 February 2022 Russian invasion of Ukraine, some German-language media outlets began using the German transcription Kyjiw, derived from the Ukrainian spelling, in late February and March 2022. The prominent Duden dictionary of the German language offers both Kiew and Kyjiw as options, as well as alternatives Kyiv and Kyïv. Given that many Ukrainian place names were "deeply rooted in the public consciousness" and that, consequently, "separating Ukrainian names from their post-colonial heritage will not be without its challenges", translator Claudia Dathe from European University Viadrina in April 2022 recommended a "transition period".

The Austrian Ministry of Foreign Affairs has been officially using the spelling Kyjiw since April 2022, after briefly stating "Kiew (Kyiv)" on its website during February and March 2022. On 24 February 2023, German newspaper Die Tageszeitung (Taz) reported under the headline Kyjiw instead of Kiew – Ukrainian for Advanced Learners: "The Taz now uses the Ukrainian spelling for Kyjiw […]. The fact that few people here are familiar with it yet, is due to a lack of knowledge about the culture."

Effective 24 February 2024, two years after the full-scale invasion, Germany's Federal Foreign Office officially changed their spelling of the Ukrainian capital from Kiew to Kyjiw. This change had been requested by Ukrainian organisations in Germany in March 2022. On 30 October 2024, the spelling was also changed by Der Spiegel and Die Zeit, and on 23 February 2025, Der Standard also made the change. By contrast, the Frankfurter Allgemeine Zeitung, Die Welt, Süddeutsche Zeitung, Funke Media Group and Ippen Holding (Frankfurter Rundschau, Münchner Merkur) as well as Neue Zürcher Zeitung continue to use the conventional spelling even in the fourth year of the war, at the turn of the year 2025/26.

== In Korean ==
On 2 March 2022, the Ministry of Foreign Affairs in South Korea announced that they would switch the Korean translation of Kyiv from the Russian-derived 키예프, Kiyepeu to the Ukrainian-derived 키이우, Kiiu. This had been requested by the Embassy of Ukraine in Korea the previous day.

== In Latvian ==
On 1 March 2022, an open letter signed by more than 100 translators, writers, poets, journalists and others called on the Latvian State Language Center to review its recommendations and adopt Ukrainian-derived transliterations instead of Russian-derived transliterations for Kyiv and other Ukrainian place names. On March 10, with a majority vote the Latvian State Language Center approved the following transliterations of Ukrainian place names in Latvian: Kijiva (Kyiv), Harkiva (Kharkiv), Odesa (Odesa), Dnipro (Dnipro), Donecka (Donetsk), Zaporižja (Zaporizhzhia), Ļviva (Lviv), Krivijriha (Kryvyi Rih), Mikolajiva (Mykolaiv), Mariupole (Mariupol), Luhanska (Luhansk), Vinnica (Vinnytsia), Makijivka (Makiivka), Sevastopole (Sevastopol), Simferopole (Simferopol), Hersona (Kherson), Černihiva (Chernihiv), Poltava (Poltava), Čerkasi (Cherkasy), Hmeļnicka (Khmelnytskyi), Sumi (Sumy), Žitomira (Zhytomyr), Černivci (Chernivtsi), Horlivka (Horlivka), Rivne (Rivne), Kamjanska (Kamianske), Kropivnicka (Kropyvnytskyi), Ivanofrankivska (Ivano-Frankivsk), Kremenčuka (Kremenchuk) and Ternopiļa (Ternopil).

== In Japanese ==
On 31 March 2022, the Ministry of Foreign Affairs in Japan announced that they would switch the Japanese translation of Kyiv from the Russian-derived キエフ, Kiefu to the Ukrainian-derived キーウ, Kīu. This had been requested by the Embassy of Ukraine in Japan in 2019.

== In Portuguese ==
Some Portuguese-language media also use Kyiv rather than Kiev, despite the latter still being the formal name of the city in Portuguese.

== In other languages ==
Introductory narrative of the Description of Ukraine (1660) by Guillaume Le Vasseur de Beauplan in French. "KIOW, formerly known as Kisovie, was once one of the most ancient cities in Europe, as evidenced by ancient remains..." Click for full PDF.

Some languages, especially the Slavic ones have their own versions of the Ukrainian capital's name, e.g. Kijów in the Polish language and Uralic languages, such as Kiova in the Finnish language.

== See also ==
- List of city name changes
- Ukrainisation
- Derussification in Ukraine
- Prescriptivism (linguistics)
