= Names of Kyiv =

The names of Kyiv, the capital of Ukraine, have varied over the years, colored both by the history of Kyiv as well as other nations' perception of the geopolitical climate.

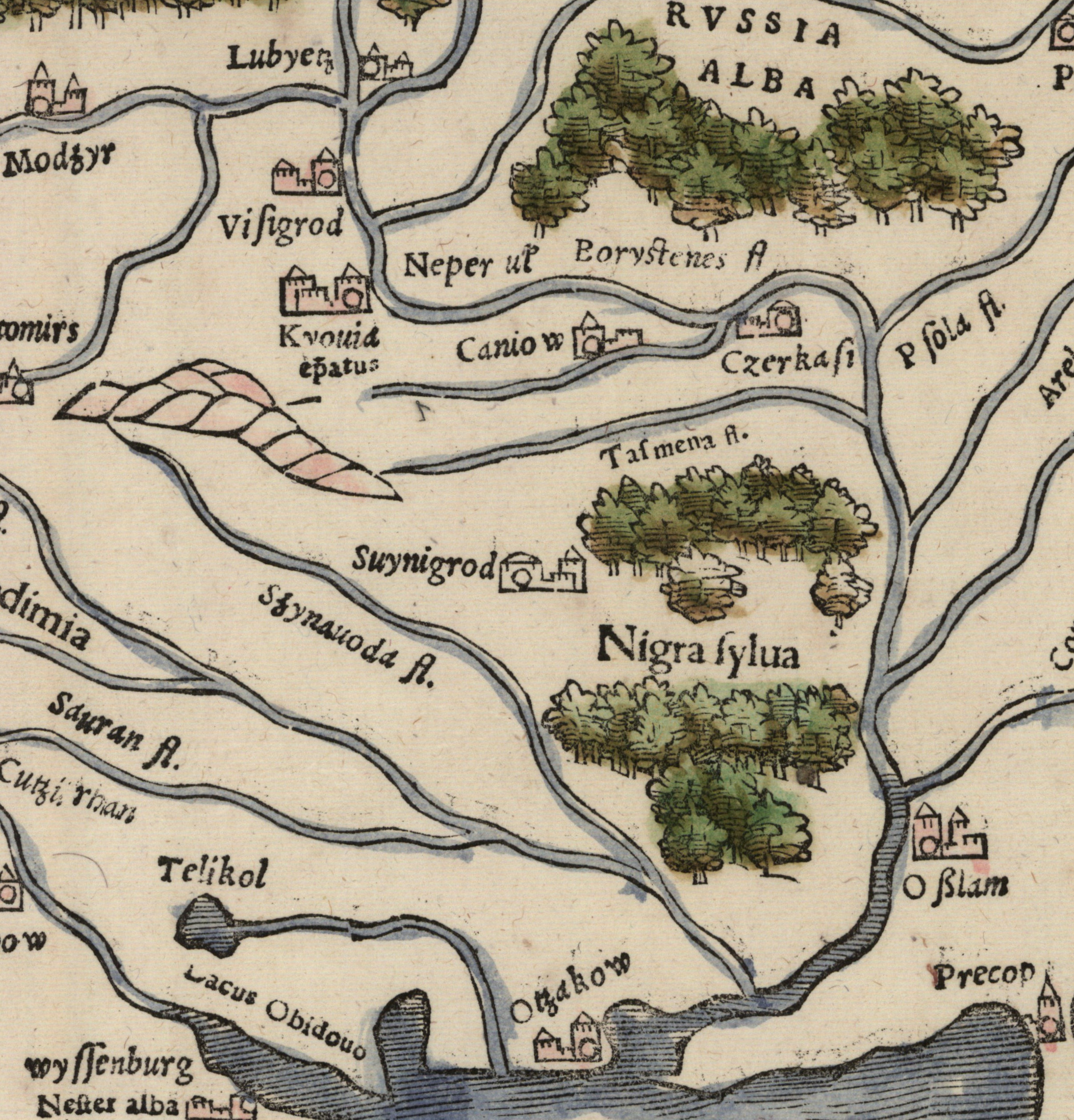
Detail of Sebastian Münster's Map of Poland and Hungary, 1552, showing Kyiv labeled "Kyouia epatus" (Latin: Kyovia episcopatus, lit. 'Kyiv episcopate')

== Modern names ==
- English: Kyiv (/ˈkiːjɪv/ KEE-yiv, /kiːv/ KEEV) or Kiev (/ˈkiːɛv/ KEE-ev)
- Ukrainian: Ки́їв, romanized: Kyiv, pronounced [ˈkɪjiu̯]
- Russian: Ки́ев (pre-1918 Кіевъ), romanized: Kiev, pronounced [ˈkʲi(j)ɪf]
- Polish: Kijów, KEE-yoof, pronounced [ˈkʲijuf]
- Belarusian: Кі́еў from Old East Slavic: Кыѥвъ

== History of names ==
Before standardization of the alphabet in the early 20th century, the name was also spelled Кыѣвъ, Киѣвъ, or Кіѣвъ with the now-obsolete letter yat. The Old Ukrainian spelling from the 14th and 15th centuries was nominally *Києвъ ("Kiev" in Latin script), but various attested spellings include кїєва (gen.), Кїєвь, and Киев (acc.), кїєво or кїєвом (ins.), києвє, Кіеве, Кїєвѣ, Києвѣ, or Киѣве (loc.).

Old East Slavic chronicles, such as the Laurentian Codex and Novgorod Chronicle, used the spellings Києвъ, Къıєвъ, or Кїєвъ. The traditional etymology, stemming from the Primary Chronicle, is that the name is a derivation of Kyi (Ukrainian: Кий, Russian: Кий (pre-1918 Кій)), the legendary eponymous founder of the city. According to Oleg Trubachyov's etymological dictionary, it derives from the Old East Slavic name *Kyjevŭ gordŭ (literally, "Kyi's castle", "Kyi's gord"), from Proto-Slavic *kyjevъ. This etymology has been questioned, for instance by Mykhailo Hrushevsky who called it an "etymological myth", and meant that the names of the legendary founders are in turn based on place names. According to the Canadian Ukrainian linguist Jaroslav Rudnyckyj, the name can be connected to the Proto-Slavic root *kyjь, but should be interpreted as meaning 'stick, pole' as in its modern Ukrainian equivalent Кий. The name should in that case be interpreted as 'palisaded settlement'.

Kyiv is the official romanized Ukrainian name for the city, and it is used for legislative and official acts. Kiev is the traditional English name for the city, but because of its historical derivation from the Russian name, Kiev lost favor with many Western media outlets after the outbreak of the Russo-Ukrainian war in 2014.

The city was known by various names in history. In the Norse sagas it was Kænugarðr or Kœnugarðr, meaning "city of the Kyivans" (from Old East Slavic: кияне, romanized: kijane), which survives in modern Icelandic Kænugarður. Perhaps the earliest original manuscript to name the city is the Kyivan letter, written c. 930 CE by representatives of the city's Jewish community, with the name written as קייוב׳, Qiyyōḇ.

The historian Julius Brutzkus in his work The Khazar Origin of Ancient Kiev hypothesizes that both Sambat and Kyiv are of Khazar origin, meaning "hill fortress" and "lower settlement" respectively. Brutzkus claims that Sambat is not Kyiv, but rather Vyshhorod (High City), which is nearby.

In the Byzantine Greek of Constantine Porphyrogenitus's 10th-century De Administrando Imperio it was Κιοάβα, Kioava, Κίοβα, Kiova, and "also called Sambatas", Σαμβατάς. In Arabic, it was كويابة, Kūyāba in Al-Istakhri's work of 951 AD, and Zānbat according to ibn Rustah and other 10th-century authors. In the medieval Latin of Thietmar of Merseburg's Chronicon it was mentioned for the year 1015 as Cuieva. After it was rebuilt in the 15th century, Kyiv was called by the Turkic (Crimean Tatar) name Menkerman or Mankerman.

As a prominent city with a long history, its English name evolved with the language. Early English sources rendered the city's name as Kiou, Kiow, Kiew, and—as in Latin—Kiovia. On one of the oldest English maps of the region, Russiae, Moscoviae et Tartariae, published by Ortelius (London, 1570), the name of the city is spelled Kiou. On the 1650 map by Guillaume de Beauplan, the name of the city is Kiiow, and the region was named Kÿowia. In the book Travels, by Joseph Marshall (London, 1772), the city is called Kiovia.

In English, Kiev appeared in print as early as 1804 in John Cary's "New map of Europe, from the latest authorities", and in Mary Holderness's 1823 travelog New Russia: Journey from Riga to the Crimea by way of Kiev. The Oxford English Dictionary included Kiev in a quotation published by 1883, and Kyiv in 2018.

The Ukrainian version of the name, Kyiw, appears in the Volume 4 of the Geographical Dictionary of the Kingdom of Poland, published in 1883.

A fragment of the New Universal Atlas by John Cary, London, 1808. The city was situated on the borderline between the former Polish (left) and Russian (right) zones of influence, with the name being presented as Kiev.

After Ukraine's independence in 1991, the Ukrainian government introduced the national rules for transliteration of geographic names into the Latin alphabet for legislative and official acts in October 1995, according to which the Ukrainian name Київ is romanized Kyiv. These rules are applied for place names and addresses, as well as personal names in passports, street signs, and so on.

In 2018, the Ukrainian Foreign Ministry launched #CorrectUA, an online campaign to promote the use of official Ukrainian spellings by countries and organizations, in place of "outdated, Soviet-era" place-names. Specifically, for the capital, the campaign KyivNotKiev was developed as part of the broader campaign.

The place name Kyiv is standardized in the authoritative database of Ukraine's toponyms maintained by Ukraine's mapping agency Derzhheokadastr. It has also been adopted by the United Nations GEGN Geographical Names Database, the United States Board on Geographic Names, the International Air Transport Association, the European Union, English-speaking foreign diplomatic missions and governments, several international organizations, and the Encyclopædia Britannica. Some English-language news sources have adopted Kyiv in their style guides, including the AP, CP, Reuters, and AFP news services, media organizations in Ukraine, and some media organizations in Canada, the United Kingdom, and the United States, despite more resistance to the spelling change compared to others, like Beijing and Mumbai.

Alternative romanizations used in English-language sources include Kyïv (according to the ALA–LC romanization used in bibliographic cataloguing), Kyjiv (scholarly transliteration used in linguistics), and Kyyiv (the 1965 BGN/PCGN transliteration standard).

The US media organization NPR adopted an on-air pronunciation of Kyiv closer to the Ukrainian, responding to the history and identity of the local population, in January 2022.
