= Kiev in the Golden Horde period =

History of Kyiv 1240–1363

Kiev in the Golden Horde period (Ukrainian: Київ у золотоординські часи, romanized: Kyiv u zolotoordnys'ki chasy) is the chapter in the history of Kyiv from the 1240 Mongol siege and conquest of Kiev until the 1362/3 Battle of Blue Waters, which saw the Grand Duchy of Lithuania emerge as the new hegemon in central Ukraine (see History of Kyiv (1362–1657)). The Mongol invasion of 1237–1242 destroyed the Kievan Rus' state and disrupted traditional economic ties. This had a negative impact on the socio-economic, political and cultural development of Kiev. The Mongol army commander Batu Khan established the Khanate of the Golden Horde, with its capital city of Sarai on the Lower Volga, replacing Kiev as the political centre of the Rus' principalities. However, Kiev remained the de jure and de facto metropolitan see, and thereby the religious centre of Rus', until at least 1299.

== Political significance (1240–1300) ==
The siege and capture of Kiev by the Mongol Horde army was accompanied by massive destruction of Kievans and significant damage to most of the city's buildings. As a result, Old Kiev (the Upper City) declined, and all life in Kiev was concentrated on Podil (the Lower City). As a result of the invasion, the population of Kiev decreased from about 40,000–50,000 to just 2,000 people.

"[We should avoid] a specious use of the argument from silence. There is very little mention of Kiev in the chronicles in the decades immediately following the sack of 1240. (Note: "The Galician-Volynian Chronicle makes only incidental mention of Kiev until 1259, then no mention at all through 1292. The Novgorod I Chronicle makes no mention of Kiev from 1246 through 1273. In the Laurentian Chronicle, there is only one incidental mention of Kiev from 1241 through 1298. The northeastern chronicles (Simeonov, Voskresensk, Volodimir, Moscow compilation of the end of the fifteenth century, Nikon, and so forth) make no mention of Kiev from 1250 through 1273.") Nor do we have chronicles of this time from Kiev, which could mean either that no chronicle writing was being done in Kiev—evidence of the bad situation there—or that whatever chronicles were written there did not survive. We really cannot say which is the case."

— Donald Ostrowski (1993, 2015)

Between 1240 and 1273, no chronicles written in Kiev, if any, are known to have survived, while Rus' chronicles compiled in other cities rarely or never mentioned Kiev (or its princes (Note: "Written sources do not provide any reliable evidence about any princes of Kyiv of the second half of the 13th to early 14th centuries. (...) It is likely that Kyiv was ruled by governors practically until the end of the 13th century.")) during this time, sometimes through the 1290s. Observing this lack of transmitted sources, earlier historians were prone to make arguments from silence to argue against the political and religious significance of Kiev (usually paired with an increased importance of Vladimir (Volodimir) on the Klyazma) during the second half of the 13th century. Modern scholars have been more cautious, especially where the enduring ecclesiastical centrality of Kiev is concerned. On the other hand, it is probable that Kiev had no autonomous princes, but that the city was administered by governors (voivodes) until about 1300.

After the invasion of 1240, there were no Horde troops in Kiev. In 1241, after confirming with Daniel of Galicia his right to Kiev, Grand Prince Michael of Chernigov returned to the city from Hungary. Therefore, Michael had to go Sarai in order to receive from Batu Khan the jarlig for the Principality of Kiev. However, Batu had Michael executed in 1246. (Note: Charles J. Halperin (1987) reasoned that the vita of Michael of Chernigov probably twisted Batu's motivation for executing him for being a political rebel into a religious infidel: "[The vita] relegated the realities of Mongol rule to the background of what is presented as a religious rather than a political confrontation. In fact, Batu executed Mikhail because he was a rebel. The khan's tolerance of other faiths and his protection of the Russian Orthodox Church were well known.") Realising the importance of Kiev as a symbol of the unity of Rus', Batu Khan did his best to prevent the revival of its political significance. By provoking conflicts between various Rus' princes (particularly Daniel of Galicia, Michael of Chernigov, and Yaroslav II of Vladimir), the khan's diplomacy created a situation of lack of authoritative political leadership in Kiev.

In 1243, Batu Khan transferred ownership of the city to Yaroslav II Vsevolodovich of Vladimir-Suzdal. The first known governor, boyar Dmytro (Dmitry) Yeykovych, was in the service of Yaroslav by 1245, when Daniel of Galicia reportedly visited the Vydubychi Monastery. It is uncertain whether or not he was the same person as voivode Dmytro, whom Daniel had appointed over Kiev in 1239, and who (unsuccessfully) led the city's defence in 1240. By 1245, the Golden Horde conducted the first census of Rus' population in the Kievan region, in order to collect tribute. This is reported by Giovanni da Pian del Carpine (Carpini) and is also mentioned in the first redaction of the vita of Michael of Chernigov (as preserved in the Novgorod First Chronicle).

When Yaroslav II died in 1246, the khan confirmed the right to Kiev and all Rus' to his sons Alexander Nevsky (1249–1263) and Yaroslav of Tver (1263–1271), who did not come to reign in Kiev, but had their residence in the north. During this time, Kiev was administered by governors appointed by the princes of Vladimir-Suzdal. After the death of Yaroslav of Tver in 1271/2, the title of grand prince of Kiev was claimed by the Romanovichi monarch Leo I of Galicia–Volhynia (styling himself "King of Ruthenia"), as well as the Olgovichi of Chernigov and the Rostislavichi of Smolensk, while the Yurievichi of Suzdalia abandoned their claim to the Kievan inheritance. In practice, however, the Principality of Kiev was probably controlled directly by khan of the Golden Horde through basqaqi from 1272 until about 1300. Presumably, during this period the city was governed by representatives of the emerging local Ruthenian nobility, controlled by the basqaqi. or managed by the city's hromada (municipality). Mentions of the basqaqi in the northeastern Rus' principalities disappear at the turn of the 13th–14th centuries, while a basqaq under prince Fedor (or Fedir) in Kiev is mentioned as late as 1331. Nothing is known for certain about this reference, such as who this basqaq and prince Fedor were, and whether Kiev owed allegiance to the Golden Horde of the Grand Duchy of Lithuania at the time.

== Religious and cultural centre (1240–1299) ==
A 1245 episode in the Galician–Volhynian Chronicle: Danilo of Galicia "...came to Kiev. Jaroslav ruled Kiev through his boyar Dimitrij Jejkovič. Danilo went to the Vydubič Monastery [and] requested the abbot and all the brothers to pray for him. And they prayed..."

Kiev continued to be the traditional ecclesiastical centre of Rus', and thus was an important factor influencing the political life of the Rus' lands. Peter Akerovich appears to have served as metropolitan of Kiev from at least 1241 to 1245; on behalf of Michael of Chernigov, he participated in the First Council of Lyon (1245), before fading from historical records.

In 1250, the patriarch ordained Daniel of Galicia's pechatnyk (chancellor) Cyril (Kyrylo) II as metropolitan of Kiev (died c. 1280–1282). Kiev remained the de jure and de facto metropolitan see, and the primates continued to be called Metropolitans of Kiev and all Rus'. (Note: Ostrowski, replying to some earlier historians who asserted the metropolitan relocation happened in 1250: "If the metropolitan had moved to Volodimir as early as 1250, then we would have to explain why the chronicles place the move in 1299, a full forty-nine years later and why they continue to treat Kiev as the de facto as well as de jure residence of the metropolitan.") Metropolitan Cyril often travelled to other Rus' cities such as Vladimir (Volodimir) on the Klyazma, Veliky Novgorod, Chernigov, Ryazan, Smolensk or Halych, but returned to Kiev after making such trips, convened councils of Rus' bishops in Kiev, ordained or confirmed Rus' bishops in Kiev, and when he died in Pereslavl-Zalessky while on a journey, his remains were brought back and buried in Kiev.

Cyril advocated a rapprochement between Rus', Nicaea and Sarai against the Catholic papacy and Crusaders. The metropolitan held a council of Rus' bishops, either in the year 1273 in Kiev, or according to other sources, in 1274 in Vladimir. (Note: Hleb Yuriyovych Ivakin (1996) wrote: "Yaroslav Mykolayovych Shchapov proved that the well-known and often mentioned in historical literature "Council of the Rus' Bishops of 1274 in Vladimir on Klyazma" (where the Rules of Cyril were adopted and Archimandrite Serapion of the Kyiv Pechersk Lavra was appointed Bishop of Vladimir) actually took place in Kyiv in 1273. Previously, only Nikolai Georgievich Berezhkov had put forward the hypothesis that this council was held not in Vladimir, but in Kyiv.") The next metropolitan, Maximos (Maksim, Maksym), held another council of Rus' bishops in Kiev in either 1282 or 1284, as the Nikon Chronicle reports: "all the bishops of Rus' were summoned to Kiev to Maksim."

By the early 1260s, book writing was restored in Kiev. In particular, at the see of Metropolitan Cyril, the Bulgarian calligrapher John Dragoslav copied from the originally Serbian Kórmchaia Book, which was written out of Bulgaria in 1262. In the early 1280s, another one with important additions was created in Kiev on the basis of this Kórmchaia Book. In 1280 or 1284, Cyril's successor, Metropolitan Maxim, convened another council of Rus' bishops in Kiev, where a new version of the Kievan Kórmchaia Book was approved. And on the basis of the latter in 1286, on the instructions of Prince Volodymyr Vasylkovych, the Volyn Kórmchaia Book was written in Volodymyr in Volyn'. (Note: Ivakin (1996): "During the study of the Novgorodian Synodal Kormcha, V. L. Yanin came to the conclusion that Metropolitan Kyrylo died in 1282, and not in 1280, as was usually stated in historiography. The error occurred due to the shift in the chronological system of the Nikon Chronicle (in this specific period) by two years. The researcher also substantiated the assumption of another all-Rus' congress of bishops in Kyiv in the year 1284. It approved a new treatment of the Kyivan Kormcha, which became the protograph for the Novgorodian Synodal Kormcha.")

== Toqta–Nogai conflict (1298–1299) ==
There was a Sack of Kiev (1299) during the war between Toqta (Tokta) against Nogai Khan and the Cumans (Polovtsi). After the 1280 death of khan Mengu-Timur of the Golden Horde, a de facto dual power structures was established between the Sarai khan Toqta and the general Nogai. The territory west of the Dnieper (Right-bank Ukraine) belonged to Nogai's power. The first military clash between Nogai and Toqta on the verge of 1298–1299, which happened somewhere around the Northern Donets river, ended in the defeat of Toqta's army. According to Arabic authors, a second decisive battle soon took place, which ended in the complete defeat of Nogai's troops and the death of the general himself. The Khan's troops devastated Nogai's former possessions, including the Kievan region, and presumably Kiev itself.

== Ecclesiastical reorganisation (1299–1317) ==
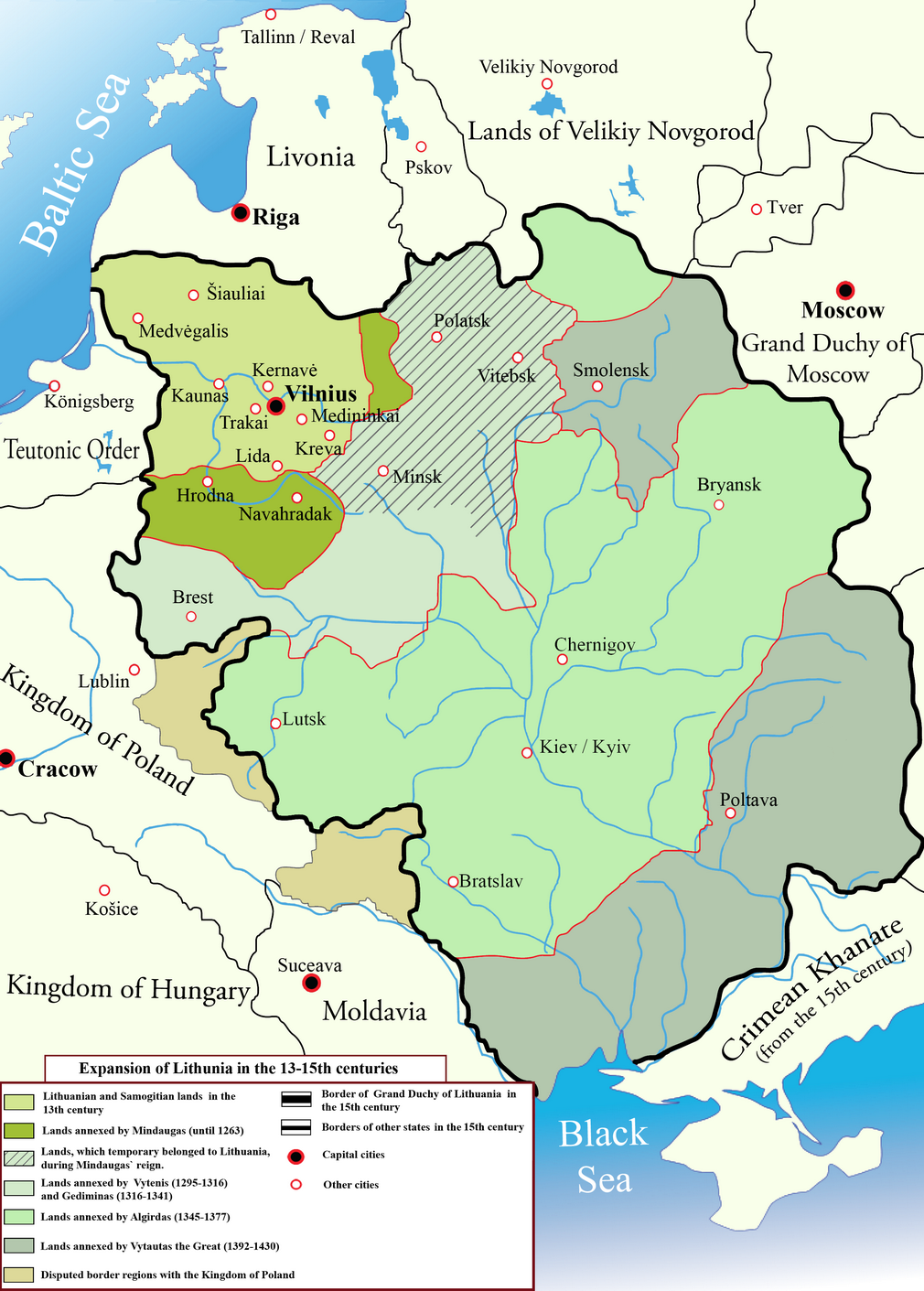
Expansion of the Grand Duchy of Lithuania in the 13th–15th centuries

In 1299 or 1300, Maximos moved the see of the Kievan metropolitans to the city of Vladimir (Volodimir) on the Klyazma in Suzdalia. The reasons and circumstances for this relocation are still debated. Traditional interpretations put a lot of weight in the phrases "Tatar oppression" (Church Slavonic: Татарьско насильӕ, romanized: Tatar'sko nasilya) and "all of Kiev fled" (Church Slavonic: и весь Киевъ розбе жалъся, romanized: i ves' Kiev' rozbezhal'sya) in the Laurentian Codex under the year 6808 (1300). (Note: Church Slavonic: Того же лета митрополитъ Максимъ, не терпя татарьско насилья, о ставя митрополью, избежа и с Киева, и весь Киевъ розбе жалъся., lit. 'In the same year metropolitan Maximos, not tolerating the Tatar oppression, left the metropolis and fled from Kiev. And the whole of Kiev scattered.') Nikolay Karamzin (1826) concluded that Maximos moved because found 'Mongol tyranny intolerable', leading Donald Ostrowski (1993, 2015) to wonder: "If that is the reason the metropolitan left Kiev, then it is not clear why he would wait until 1299, when Mongol control in the area was declining and the Lithuanians were moving into the area."

Based on the same chronicle entry stating that "all the city of Kiev did flee also" or "all Kiev fled (razbězhesia)", Vasily Klyuchevsky (died 1911) asserted that the entire population of Kiev fled to Vladimir due to the Mongol invasion, taking the metropolitan with them. Ostrowski noted that these entries do not indicate the direction where the Kievans fled towards, while some of them stayed in the city according to other entries, and remarked: "Kliuchevskii makes no effort to account for the apparent time delay between the Mongol sack of Kiev in 1240 and the move of the metropolitan fifty-nine years later. If conditions in Kiev were so bad, one would think that the metropolitan would have moved sooner."

Nevertheless, until 1461, the metropolitans who lived in Vladimir held the title Metropolitans of Kiev and all Rus'. For a long time, the Ecumenical Patriarchate of Constantinople did not recognise the metropolitan residential transfer from Kiev to Vladimir, and later Moscow. In response, the Kingdom of Galicia–Volhynia requested the Patriarch of Constantinople a separate Metropolis of Halych for the southwestern Rus' principalities, which was established in 1303. The Metropolis of Lithuania, headquartered in Navahrudak and encompassing large parts of present-day Belarus that had been acquired by the Grand Duchy of Lithuania, was established in or around 1317; another reduction of the nominal jurisdiction of the Metropolis of Kiev.

== Dynastic and military evolution (1300–1363) ==
Meanwhile, in 1300/1301, with the help of Khan Tokta, representatives of the Olgovichi clan (of Chernigov and Novhorod-Siverskyi) appear to have obtained possession of Kiev. The Synodikon of Liubech mentions the names of princes Volodymyr-Ivan Ivanovych and Stanislav of Kiev.

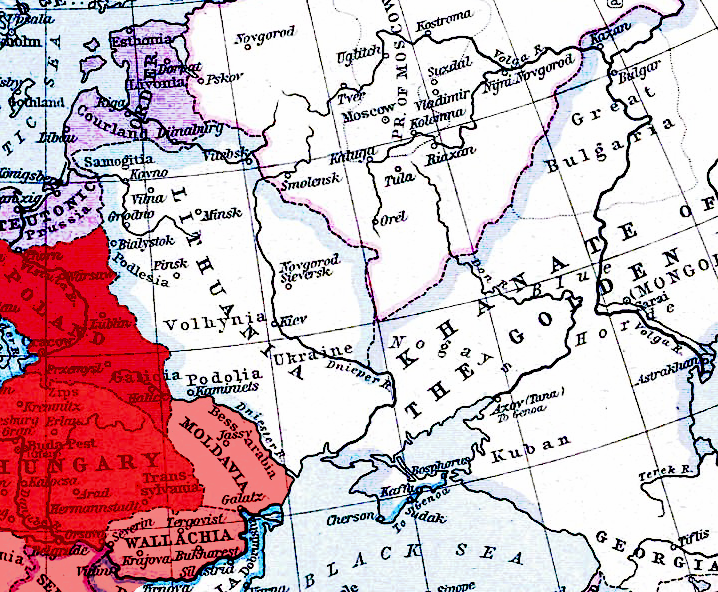
Ukraine around 1360

A number of relatively late and questionable chronicles (Note: Including the Chronicle of the Grand Duchy of Lithuania, Ruthenia and Samogitia, Bychowiec Chronicle, and Hustyn Chronicle, as well as the Rumyantsev, Yevreinovsky and other chronicles.) record that in the early 1320s (traditionally dated 1321), a Battle on the Irpin River took place between the Gediminas, Grand Duke of Lithuania, and prince Stanislav of Kiev; Gediminas' victory would have made the city dependent on the Grand Duchy of Lithuania for 10 years. As his governor over Kiev, Gediminas reportedly appointed Mindaugas (Mindovg) Holshanski, "who was baptised into the Rus' faith". The historicity of this battle is contested; some anachronisms in the texts, and its absence in other sources, have led many scholars (from Karamzin in 1817 onwards) to conclude this military clash did not take place, at least not as narrated. In that case, Golden Horde hegemony over central Ukraine including the Kievan region probably persisted until 1362/3.

In 1331, a Kievan prince named Fedir-Hlib Ivanovych (or Fedor), was first mentioned. Given that his name is also connected with the last mention of a basqaq in Kiev, it has been surmised by some scholars that Fedir was a vassal of the Golden Horde, although an allegiance to Lithuania cannot be ruled out.

In 1359, when the Jochid clan died out, a war of succession known as the Great Troubles broke out within the Golden Horde. The Lithuanians and their allies took advantage of the turmoil, and under the command of Algirdas defeated a Horde army at the Battle of Blue Waters, either in the year 1362 or 1363. The Principality of Kiev was most probably incorporated into the Grand Duchy of Lithuania in the aftermath, or (less likely) just before the battle, but almost certainly in the 1360s during the reign of Algirdas.

== Black Death in Kiev ==
Spread of the Black Death

Lawrence Langer (1975) analysed medieval chronicle reports on plagues and data on natural calamities gathered by Soviet researchers, showing that, apart from epidemics which allegedly affected "all of Rus'", the city of Kiev experienced only three local outbreaks of the Black Death in 1352, 1376, and 1419–1420. This would have been very few times compared to northwestern Rus' cities such as Novgorod, Pskov, Smolensk and Polotsk, and northeastern Rus' cities like Tver, Moscow, Vladimir and Suzdal, but more often than Chernigov, which is only mentioned once under 1352. (Note: Того лсе л та гіысть вюръ спленъ з ло въ Смоленск, и въ Кіев, п въ Чернигов и въ Суждал, и во всей земл Руссхей смерть люта, и напрасна и скора; и бысть страхъ u трепетъ велій" на вс хъ человц хі.. "That same year the plague was spread in Smolensk, and in Kiev, and in Chernigov, and in Suzhdal, and in the whole of Rus' death was fierce, vain and swift; and great fear and trembling came upon all men." Nikon Chronicle, PSRL X, 1965, p. 223.) Langer indicated that there were probably some biases in the data, as the Soviet researchers were primarily interested in explaining crop failures in Russia. There was no good explanation yet why the Black Death in 1349–1352 seems to have entered northwestern Rus' cities such as Novgorod, Pskov and Polotsk from Germany, rather than from the south, where it was first noted during the Siege of Caffa in Crimea in c. 1346.

Langer questioned George Vernadsky's (1953) explanation 'that the Russian steppe was thinly populated and hence acted as a buffer zone between the Golden Horde and north-east Russia', because he found it 'still quite possible that the path of the Black Death along the Dnepr river may have originated in the Crimea or possibly from Lithuania.' A 2017 paper by Cesana, Benedictow & Bianucci showed a map with a dotted line, representing the "Approximate border between the Mongol Khanate, the Golden Horde, and the Russian principalities[.] Passage prohibited for Christians.", without further explanation.

== See also ==
- History of Kyiv
  - History of Kyiv (1362–1657)
  - History of Kyiv (1657–1811)
  - History of Kyiv (1811–1917)
- List of wars and battles involving the Golden Horde
- Siege of Kiev (1240)
- Timeline of the Golden Horde

== Bibliography ==
=== Primary sources ===
- Giovanni da Pian del Carpine, Ystoria Mongalorum (1240s)
- Galician–Volhynian Chronicle (c. 1292), a continuation of the Kievan Chronicle.
  - Shakhmatov, Aleksey Aleksandrovich, ed. (1908). Галицко-Волынскій сводъ [The Galician–Volhynian Codex]. Complete Collection of Russian Chronicles (PSRL) (in Church Slavic). Vol. 2 (3rd ed.). Saint Petersburg: Typography of M. A. Aleksandrov / Izbornyk. pp. 715–938. – critical edition
  - Perfecky, George A. (1973). The Hypatian Codex Part Two: The Galician–Volynian Chronicle. An annotated translation by George A. Perfecky. Munich: Wilhelm Fink Verlag. OCLC 902306. – 1973 English translation
  - (modern Ukrainian translation) Makhnovets, Leonid (1989). Літопис Руський за Іпатським списком [Rus' Chronicle according to the Hypatian Codex] (in Ukrainian). Kyiv: Dnipro. p. 591. ISBN 5-308-00052-2. — A modern annotated Ukrainian translation of the Galician–Volhynian Chronicle based on the Hypatian Codex with comments from the Khlebnikov Codex.
- Laurentian Codex (1377), the Nizhegorodian continuation of the Suzdalian Chronicle.
  - (Church Slavonic critical edition) Лаврентьевская летопись [Laurentian Chronicle]. Полное Собрание Русских Литописей [Complete Collection of Russian chronicles]. Vol. 1. Leningrad: Academy of Science (SSSR). 1926–1928. pp. 285–301.
  - "Laurentian Codex 1377" (in Church Slavic and Russian). National Library of Russia. 2012. [digitisation of the Laurentian Codex, including the Suzdalian Chronicle, with a transcription of the Old Church Slavonic text and a translation into modern Russian].
- Novgorod First Chronicle (c. 13th–15th centuries).
  - (Church Slavonic Synodal Scroll critical edition) Izbornyk (1950). "Новгородская Первая Летопись Старшего Извода (синодальный Список)" [Novgorod First Chronicle of the Older Edition (Synodal Scroll)]. Izbornyk (in Church Slavic). Moscow / Leningrad: Academy of Sciences of the USSR. – digitised version of the late-13th-century Synodal Scroll edition (or "Older Edition") of the Novgorod First Chronicle (Synodalnyy NPL).
  - (modern English translation) Michell, Robert; Forbes, Nevill (1914). The Chronicle of Novgorod 1016–1471. Translated from the Russian by Robert Michell and Nevill Forbes, Ph.D. Reader in Russian in the University of Oxford, with an introduction by C. Raymond Beazley and A. A. Shakhmatov (PDF). London: Gray's Inn. p. 237.

=== Literature ===
- Artemenko, I.I. (1982). История Киева в трех томах, четырех книгах. Том первый. Древний и средневековый Киев [History of Kiev in three volumes, four books. Volume one. Ancient and Medieval Kiev] (in Russian). Kiev: Naukova Dumka. p. 408.
- Cesana, D.; Benedictow, O.J.; Bianucci, R. (2017). "The origin and early spread of the Black Death in Italy: first evidence of plague victims from 14th-century Liguria (northern Italy)". Anthropological Science. 125 (1): 15–24. doi:10.1537/ase.161011. ISSN 0918-7960. Archived from the original on 15 January 2025.
- Halperin, Charles J. (1987). Russia and the Golden Horde: The Mongol Impact on Medieval Russian History. Indiana University. p. 222. ISBN 9781850430575. (e-book).
- Ivakin, Hleb Yuriyovych (1996). Історичний розвиток Києва XIII — середина XVI ст [Historical development of Kyiv in the 13th to mid-16th centuries] (in Ukrainian). Kyiv: Naukova Dumka. p. 272. ISBN 5-85654-047-6.
- Langer, Lawrence N. (1975). "The Black Death in Russia: Its Effects Upon Urban Labor". Russian History. 2 (1): 53–67. doi:10.1163/187633175X00045. ISSN 0094-288X. JSTOR 24649670.
- Martin, Janet (2007). Medieval Russia: 980–1584. Second Edition. E-book. Cambridge: Cambridge University Press. ISBN 978-0-511-36800-4.
- Ostrowski, Donald (2023) [1993]. "Why Did the Metropolitan Move from Kiev to Vladimir in the Thirteenth Century?". California Slavic Studies. Volume 16. University of California Press. pp. 83–101. ISBN 9780520313606.
  - Ostrowski, Don (30 December 2015). "The Move of the Metropolitan from Kiev in 1299". Academia.edu. p. 26. (updated, open-source version of the same article)
- Raffensperger, Christian; Ostrowski, Donald (2023). The Ruling Families of Rus: Clan, Family and Kingdom. London: Reaktion Books. p. 309. ISBN 978-1-78914-745-2. (e-book)
