= History of Kyiv =

Historical affiliations

Tributary of the Khazar Khaganate (? – c. 880)
Kievan Rus' (c. 880–1240)
Principality of Kiev 1132–1471
∟ part of Kievan Rus' from 1132 to 1240
∟ part of the Golden Horde from the 1240s to 1362
∟ part of the Grand Duchy of Lithuania from 1362 to 1471
Grand Duchy of Lithuania 1471–1569
Crown of the Kingdom of Poland 1569–1648
∟ part of the Polish–Lithuanian Commonwealth
Cossack Hetmanate 1648–1737
∟ part of the Polish–Lithuanian Commonwealth from 1648 to 1667
∟ part of the Tsardom of Russia from 1667 to 1721
∟ part of the Russian Empire from 1721 to 1737
Russian Empire 1737–1917
Ukrainian People's Republic 1917–1918
Ukrainian State 1918
Ukrainian People's Republic 1918–1920
Ukrainian SSR 1919–1941
∟ part of the Soviet Union from 1922 to 1941
Reichskommissariat Ukraine 1941–1944
∟ part of German-occupied Europe from 1941 to 1944
Ukrainian SSR 1944–1991
∟ part of the Soviet Union from 1944 to 1991
Ukraine 1991–present

The history of Kyiv (before 1991 commonly known as Kiev) (Note: Ukrainian: Київ, before 1991 officially known as Kiev (Russian: Киев, pre-1918 spelling Кіевъ. Since Ukrainian independence in 1991, English-language literature and media have gradually switched from the Russian-derived spelling Kiev to the Ukrainian-derived spelling Kyiv. See Names of Kyiv for more information.) spans over a millennium. It has served as the capital city of several countries up until present-day Ukraine, but the city's exact origins are uncertain and debated. In the 1970s, Kyiv was officially designated to have been founded in 482, and thus its 1500th anniversity was celebrated in 1982, but depending on various criteria, the city or settlement may date back at least 2,000 years. Archaeologists have dated the oldest-known settlement in the area to 25,000 BC.

Legend recorded in later writings such as the Primary Chronicle has it that Saint Andrew (d. AD 60/70) visited the hilly shores of the Dnieper River and prophesied that a great city would emerge there. The same Chronicle reports another legend asserting that the three brothers Kyi, Shchek and Khoryv and their sister Lybid founded the city and, after the eldest brother Kyi, named it Kyevû (киевъ, amongst many other attested spelling variations). The earliest more reliable evidence suggests it was initially an early medieval Slavic settlement paying tribute to the Khazars. Reportedly conquered or otherwise acquired by Varangians in c. 880, Kyiv would be the capital of medieval Kievan Rus' until 1240.

From the late 9th century, it gradually acquired eminence as a socio-economic and political center on the crossroads of early Slavic, Varangian (Old Norse), and Finno-Ugric languages and cultures, with a mixture of pagan Slavic, Norse, Christian, Islamic and Jewish religious traditions and influences. The Christianization of Kievan Rus' would eventually lead to the dominance of Christianity, as well as the adoption of Church Slavonic as the literary standard for communication. Its political, but not cultural, importance declined after 1169, when the troops of Andrey Bogolyubsky sacked the old town. Numerous sackings of Kyiv by other Rus' princes followed and it was thoroughly devastated in the Mongol invasion of 1240.

In the following centuries, the city was a provincial capital of marginal importance on the outskirts of territories controlled by powerful neighbors: the Golden Horde, the Grand Duchy of Lithuania, its successor the Polish–Lithuanian Commonwealth, and the Tsardom of Russia, which later became the Russian Empire. Kyiv was also a major center for early modern Ukrainian culture, especially during the Cossack Hetmanate in the 17th–18th centuries, although the administrative capitals in this period of Cossack independence and autonomy were Chyhyryn (1649–1676), Baturyn (1663–1708), and Hlukhiv (1708–1764).

Kyiv prospered in the Russian industrial revolution of the late 19th century. In the conflicts and turbulence that followed the October Revolution of 1917, it became the capital of several short-lived Ukrainian states. From December 1922 on, it was part of the Soviet Union, and from 1934 the capital of Soviet Ukraine. In World War II the city was again destroyed, almost completely, but quickly recovered post-war to become the third-most important Soviet city and the capital of the second-most populous Soviet republic. It remains the capital of Ukraine, independent since the 1991 dissolution of the Soviet Union.

== Origins ==
=== Founding legends ===
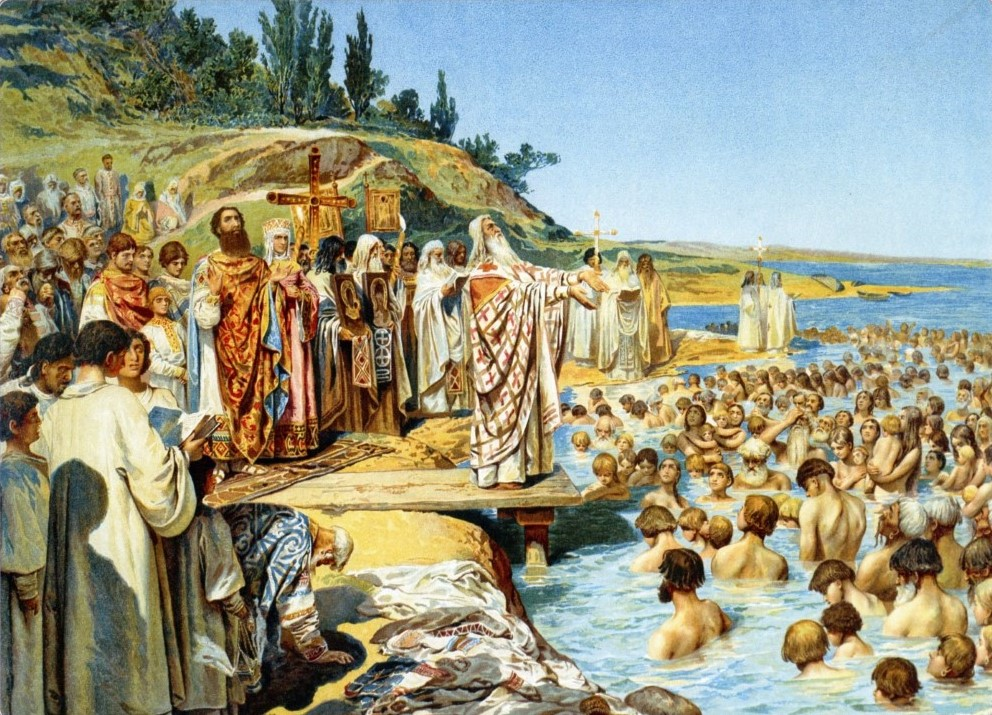
The Baptism of Kyivans, a painting by Klavdiy Lebedev (c. 1900).

According to a legend recorded in the Primary Chronicle (PVL), some early Slavs known as "Polyanians" – "because they lived in the fields" – settled on the river Dnieper (Dnipro) at an unspecified time. At some point, a founder-family consisting of four siblings named Kyi, Shchek, Khoryv and Lybid reportedly founded the city on three hills along the river, and named it Kyiv (Ukrainian: Київ; Old East Slavic: киевъ, romanized: Kyevŭ) after their eldest brother Kyi.

Certain Slavs settled also on the Dnipro, and were likewise called Polyanians (...). While the Polyanians lived apart and governed their families (for before the time of these brothers there were already Polyanians, and each one lived with his gens on his own lands, ruling over his kinsfolk), there were three brothers, Kyi, Shchek, and Khoriv, and their sister was named Lybed'. Kyi lived upon the hill where the Borichev trail now is, and Shchek dwelt upon the hill now named Shchekovitsa, while on the third resided Khoriv, after whom this hill is named Khorevitsa. They built a town and named it Kyiv after their oldest brother.

— Primary Chronicle 6.12–13; 9.5–21.

=== Archaeological and linguistic studies ===
Slavic settlements existed in the area starting from the end of the 5th century, and later developed into the city. Archaeological excavations have suggested seventh or eighth century commercial activity in Kyiv's Podil district, but dendrochronological analysis of ruined remnants of Podil log dwellings has only found evidence of settlement as far back as 887. Omeljan Pritsak writes that archaeologists have proven "beyond any doubt that Kyiv as a town did not exist before the last quarter of the ninth to the first half of the tenth century."

Western historians (e.g. Julius Brutzkus, Kevin Alan Brook) speculated that the city was founded by Khazars or Magyars: Brutzkus posited an etymology of Kyiv as a Turkic place name (Küi = riverbank + ev = settlement). Meanwhile Canadian Ukrainian linguist Jaroslav Rudnyckyj connects the name Kyiv to the Proto-Slavic root *kyjь, which should be interpreted as meaning 'stick, pole' as in its modern Ukrainian equivalent кий and proposes the toponym should in that case be interpreted as 'palisaded settlement'. The Primary Chronicle, an important source of information on the early history of the area, says that Slavic Kyivans told Askold and Dir that they had no local ruler and paid tribute to the Khazars - an event attributed to the 9th century. Brook believes that in the 8th and 9th centuries the city was an outpost of the Khazar empire. A hill-fortress called Sambat (Old Turkic for "high place") was built to defend the area.

However it was founded, the city's location made it a node on important ancient trade routes. In the seventh or eighth century the Dnipro came to be the standard route between Scandinavia and the Byzantine Empire, while the Desna gave the area water access via portages to the Don and Oka-Volga basins.

== Kyivan Rus' ==
Kyivan Rus' principalities (map showing the situation of 1132) in the 1167–9 succession crisis: Iziaslavichi Kyiv (Note: Including Oleshia.) – Iziaslavichi Novgorod – Iziaslavichi Volynia – Iziaslavichi Halych – Rostislavichi of Tmutarakan Coalition Pereyaslavl – Yurievichi Suzdalia – Yurievichi Smolensk – Rostislavichi of Smolensk Chernigov – Olgovichi Neutral Murom-Ryazan – Sviatoslavichi (Olgovichi branch) Polotsk – Vseslavichi (disputed territory)

According to the Primary Chronicle, Oleg the Wise (Helgi) conquered the city in 881/2. He was a relative of Rurik, a Varangian pagan chieftain. The date given for Oleg's conquest of the town in the Primary Chronicle is uncertain, and some historians, such as Omeljan Pritsak and Constantin Zuckerman, dispute this account and maintain that Khazar rule continued until as late as the 920s (documentary evidence exists to support this assertion — see the Kyivan Letter and the Schechter Letter).

Since Oleg's seizure of the city, Kyiv functioned as the capital of Kyivan Rus', which was ruled by the Varangian Rurikid dynasty which gradually became Slavicized. The Grand Princes had traditional primacy over the other rulers of the land and the Kyivan princehood was a valuable prize in an intra-dynastic system. In 968 the city withstood a siege by the nomadic Pechenegs.

In 988, Prince Volodymyr I (St. Volodymyr) converted to Christianity and ordered the city residents to accept baptism en masse in the Dnipro river, an event which symbolized the Baptism of Kyivan Rus to Orthodox Christianity. The city reached the height of its position – its political and cultural Golden Age – in the middle of the 11th century under Volodymyr's son Yaroslav the Wise (Grand Prince from 1019 to 1054). In 1051, prince Yaroslav assembled the bishops at St. Sophia Cathedral and appointed Hilarion as the first native-born metropolitan bishop of Rus'.

In spite of the East–West Schism in Christianity, the Kyivan church maintained good relations with Rome (note for example prince Iziaslav I's request to Pope Gregory VII to extend to Kyivan Rus "the patronage of St. Peter", which the Pope fulfilled by sending Iziaslav a crown from Rome in 1075). An Armenian merchant factory was based in Kyiv from the 11th century until the 13th-century Mongol invasions.

Following the feudalisation of the Kyivan Rus' polity, the inner Principality of Kyiv emerged in 1132. Subsequent years saw rivalries of the competing princes of the dynasty and the weakening of Kyiv's political influence, although the city temporarily prevailed after the defeat of Polotsk at the Battle on the river Nemiga (1067) that also led to the burning of Minsk. In 1146 the next Rus' bishop, Kliment Smoliatich of Smolensk, was appointed to serve as the Metropolitan of Kyiv and all Rus'. In 1169 Andrei of Suzdal (Bogolyubsky) sent an army against Mstislav II Izyaslavich and Kyiv. Led by one of his sons, it consisted of the forces of eleven other princes, representing three of the main branches of the Rurikid dynasty against the fourth, the Iziaslavichi of Volynia. The allies were victorious, and sacked the city for three days. They left the old town and the prince's hall in ruins, and took many pieces of religious artwork - including the Theotokos of Vladimir icon – from nearby Vyshhorod. Kyiv remained the political and religious capital of Rus', and the symbol of agnatic seniority within the princely family. Bogolyubsky maintained his resicence in Vladimir, while his younger brother Gleb received the Kyivan throne due to being next in line as the prince of Pereyaslavl, thereby restoring the order of succession. However, Gleb died only 2 years later in 1171, so that Andrey lost his indirect control over Kyiv. When he tried to take back the capital in 1173 with a fresh coalition army, it was utterly defeated at the Battle of Vyshgorod.

In 1203, Prince Rurik Rostislavich captured and burned Kyiv. In the 1230s different Rus' princes besieged and ravaged the city several times. Then Mongol-Tatar forces led by Batu Khan besieged and then completely destroyed the city on 6 December 1240. The Mongols had originally planned to take the city unharmed, but upon their arrival, the garrison threw down the bodies of the Mongol diplomats sent to urge them to surrender. In revenge the Mongols broke down the gates and slaughtered much of the population, then razed the city.

== Golden Horde ==
Kiev in the Golden Horde period is the chapter in the history of Kyiv from the 1240 Mongol siege and conquest of Kiev until the 1362/3 Battle of Blue Waters, which saw the Grand Duchy of Lithuania emerge as the new hegemon in central Ukraine (see History of Kyiv (1362–1657)). The Mongol invasion of 1237–1242 destroyed the Kievan Rus' state and disrupted traditional economic ties. This had a negative impact on the socio-economic, political and cultural development of Kiev. The Mongol army commander Batu Khan established the Khanate of the Golden Horde, with its capital city of Sarai on the Lower Volga, replacing Kiev as the political centre of the Rus' principalities. However, Kiev remained the de jure and de facto metropolitan see, and thereby the religious centre of Rus', until at least 1299.

== Grand Duchy of Lithuania ==
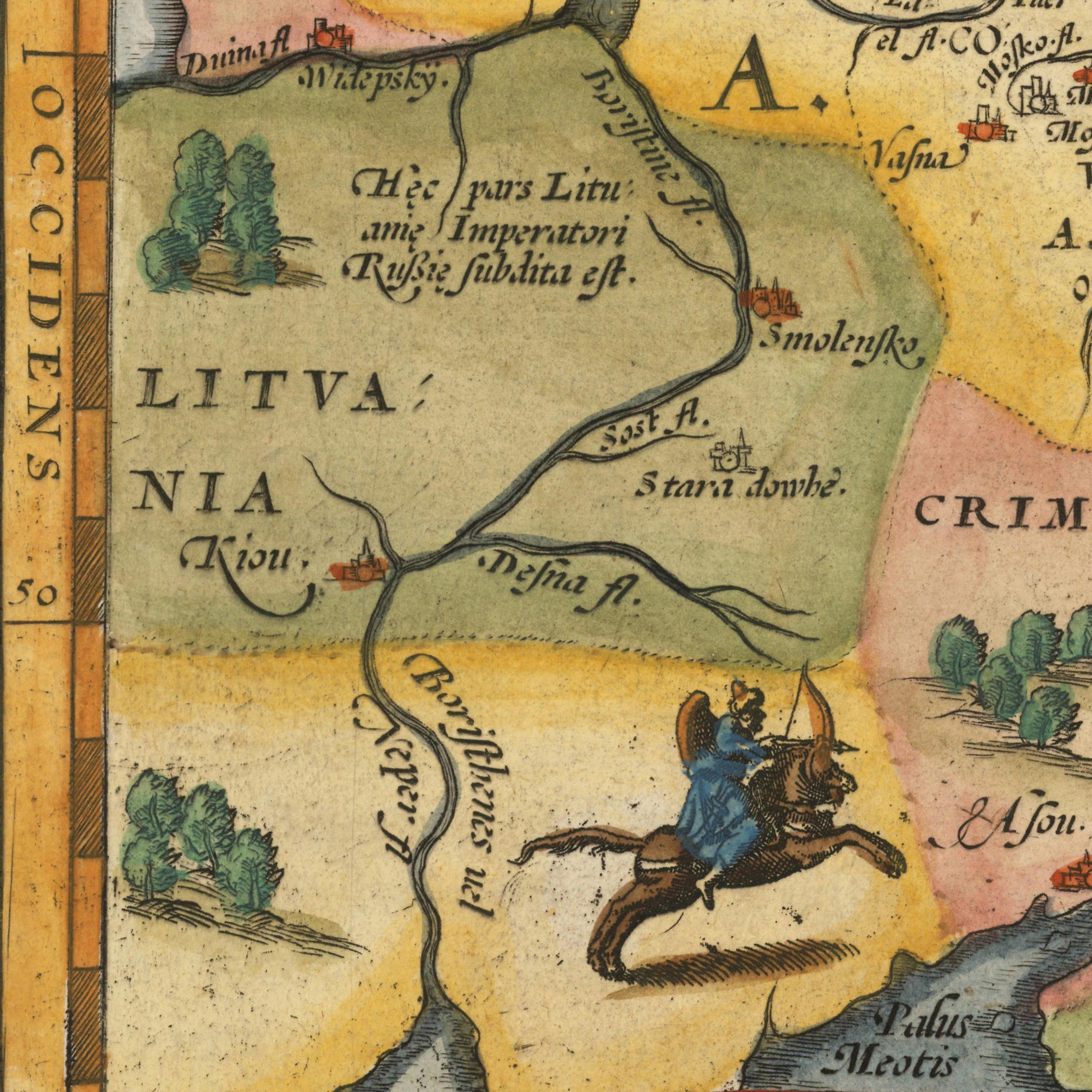
Kyiv, labelled Kiou, in a detail of Ortelius's 1562 map "Russiae, Moscoviae et Tartariae Descriptio" (Description of Rus, Muscovy, and Tartary).

Kyiv became a part of the Grand Duchy of Lithuania after the Battle at Blue Waters in 1362, when Algirdas, Grand Duke of Lithuania, beat a Golden Horde army. During the period between 1362 and 1471, the city was ruled by Lithuanian princes from different families. By order of Casimir Jagiellon, the Principality of Kyiv was abolished and the Kyiv Voivodeship was established in 1471. Lithuanian statesman Martynas Goštautas was appointed as the first voivode of Kyiv the same year; his appointment was met by hostility from locals.

At the time of the Lithuanian rule, the core of the city was located in Podil and there was a Lithuanian Kyiv Castle with 18 towers on the Zamkova Hora.

The city was frequently attacked by Crimean Tatars and in 1482 was sacked again by Crimean Khan Meñli I Giray. Despite its diminished political significance, the city still played an important role as seat of the local Orthodox metropolitan. Starting in 1494, however, the city's local autonomy (Magdeburg rights) gradually increased in a series of acts of Lithuanian Grand Dukes and Polish Kings, finalized by a charter granted by Sigismund I the Old in 1516.

Kyiv had a Jewish community of some significance in the early sixteenth century. The tolerant Sigismund II Augustus granted equal rights to Jews in the city, on the grounds that they paid the same taxes as Podil's burghers. Polish sponsorship of Jewish settlement in the city added fuel to the conflict that already existed between the Orthodox and Catholic churches.

== Kingdom of Poland ==
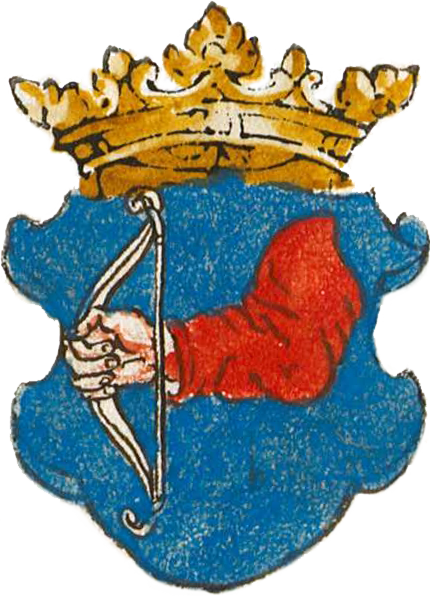
Coat of arms of Kyiv during the 16th century

In 1569, under the Union of Lublin that formed the Polish–Lithuanian Commonwealth Kyiv was transferred to the Crown of the Kingdom of Poland, remaining the capital of the Kijów Voivodeship. Its role of Orthodox center strengthened due to expansion of Roman Catholicism under Polish rule. In 1632, Peter Mogila, the Orthodox Metropolitan of Kyiv and Galicia established the Kyiv-Mohyla Academy, an educational institution aimed to preserve and develop Ukrainian culture and Orthodox faith despite Polish Catholic oppression. Although ruled by the church, the academy provided students with educational standards close to universities of Western Europe (including multilingual training) and became the foremost educational center, both religious and secular.

== Cossack Hetmanate ==
In 1648, Bohdan Khmelnytsky's Cossacks triumphantly entered the city in the course of their uprising establishing the rule of their Cossack Hetmanate in the city. The Zaporizhian Host had a special status within the newly formed political entity. The complete sovereignty of the Hetmanate did not last long as the Polish–Lithuanian Commonwealth refused to recognize it and resumed hostilities. In January 1654, Khmelnytsky decided to sign the Treaty of Pereyaslav with Tsardom of Russia to obtain military support against the Polish Crown. However, in November 1656 the Muscovites concluded the Truce of Vilna with the Polish–Lithuanian Commonwealth, which was approved by Bohdan Khmelnytsky. After his death, in the atmosphere of sharp conflicts his successor became Ivan Vyhovsky who signed the Treaty of Hadiach. It was ratified by the Crown in a limited version. According to Vyhovsky's original intention, Kyiv was to become the capital of the Grand Duchy of Ruthenia with limited federate rights within the Polish–Lithuanian–Ruthenian Commonwealth. However, this part of the Treaty was removed during the ratification. In the meantime, Vyhovsky's opponent Yuri Khmelnytsky signed the Second Treaty of Pereyaslav in October 1659 with a representative of the Russian tsar. In 1660, the local Armenians were expelled by Tsar Alexis of Russia.

== Hetmanate under Russian suzerainty (1667–1775) until the Great Fire of Podil (1811) ==
On 31 January 1667 the Truce of Andrusovo was concluded, in which the Polish–Lithuanian Commonwealth ceded Smolensk, Severia and Chernigov, and, on paper only for a period of two years, the city of Kyiv to the Tsardom of Russia. The Eternal Peace of 1686 acknowledged the status quo and put the city under the control of Russia for the centuries to come. Ukraine slowly lost its autonomy, which was finally abolished in 1775 by the Empress Catherine the Great. None of the Polish-Russian treaties concerning the city have ever been ratified.

The 1811 Great Fire of Podil devastated the city. Reconstruction in subsequent years fundamentally changed the urban landscape.

== Russian Empire ==
In 1834, St. Vladimir University was established in the city (now known as National Taras Shevchenko University of Kyiv). The Ukrainian poet Taras Shevchenko cooperated with its geography department as a field researcher and editor. The Magdeburg Law existed in Kyiv till that year, when it was abolished by the Decree of Tsar Nicholas I of Russia on 23 December 1834.

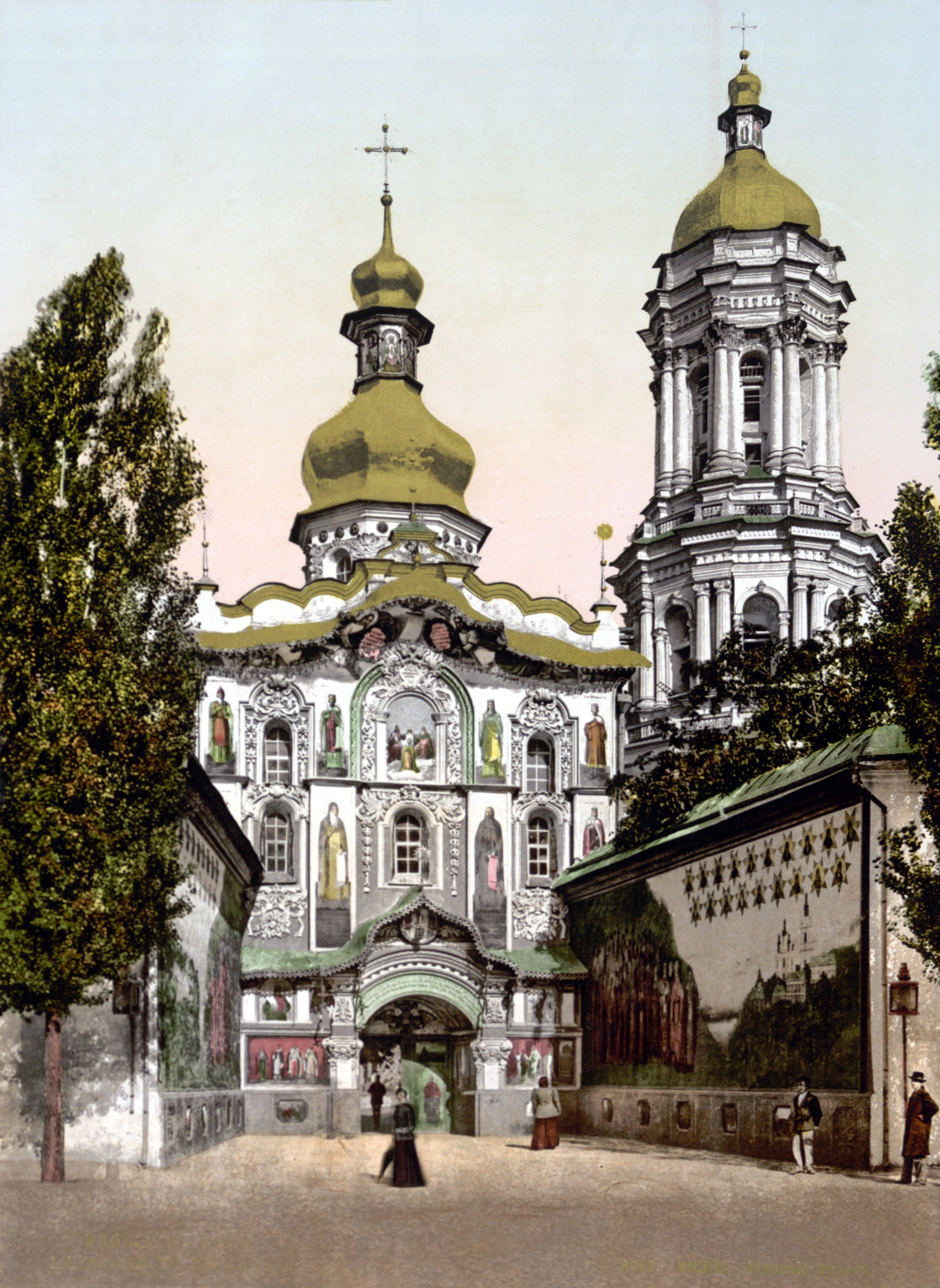
The gates to the Monastery of the Caves in the 1890s.

Even after Kyiv and the surrounding region ceased being a part of Poland, Poles continued to play an important role. In 1812 there were over 43,000 Polish noblemen in Kyiv province, compared to only approximately 1,000 Russian nobles. Typically the nobles spent their winters in the city, where they held Polish balls and fairs. Until the mid-18th century Kyiv preserved the domination of Polish culture, although Poles made up no more than ten percent of the city's population and 25% of its voters. During the 1830s Polish was the language of Kyiv's educational system, and until Polish enrollment in the university of St. Vladimir was restricted in the 1860s Poles made up the majority of that school's student body. The Russian government's cancellation of the city's autonomy and its placement under the rule of bureaucrats appointed from St. Petersburg was largely motivated by fear of Polish insurrection in the city. Warsaw factories and fine Warsaw shops had branches in Kyiv. Józef Zawadzki, founder of Kyiv's stock exchange, served as the city's mayor in the 1890s. Poles living in the city tended to be friendly towards the Ukrainian national movement, and some took part in Ukrainian organizations. Indeed, many of the poorer Polish nobles became Ukrainianized in language and culture and these Ukrainians of Polish descent constituted an important element of the growing Ukrainian national movement. Kyiv served as a meeting point where such activists came together with the pro-Ukrainian descendants of Cossack officers from the left bank. Many of them would leave the city for the surrounding countryside in order to try to spread Ukrainian ideas among the peasants.

According to the Russian census of 1874, of 127,251 people living in Kyiv, 38,553 (39%) spoke "Little Russian" (the Ukrainian language), 12,917 (11%) spoke Yiddish, 9,736 (10%) spoke Great Russian, 7,863 (6%) spoke Polish, and 2,583 (2%) spoke German. 48,437 (or 49%) of the city's residents were listed as speaking "generally Russian speech (obshcherusskoe narechie)." Such people were typically Ukrainians and Poles who could speak enough Russian to be counted as Russian-speaking.

From the late 18th century until the late 19th century, city life was increasingly dominated by Russian military and ecclesiastical concerns. Russian Orthodox Church institutions formed a significant part of the city's infrastructure and business activity at that time. In the winter 1845–1846, the historian Mykola Kostomarov founded a secret political society, the Brotherhood of Saints Cyril and Methodius, whose members put forward the idea of a federation of free Slavic people with Ukrainians as a distinct group among them rather than a part of the Russian nation. The Brotherhood's ideology was a synthesis of programmes of three movements: Ukrainian autonomists, Polish democrats, and Russian Decembrists in Ukraine. The society was quickly suppressed by the Tsarist authorities in March–April 1847.

Following the gradual loss of Ukraine's autonomy and suppression of the local Ukrainian and Polish cultures, Kyiv experienced growing Russification in the 19th century by means of Russian migration, administrative actions (such as the Valuev Circular of 1863), and social modernization. At the beginning of the 20th century, the city was dominated by Russian-speaking population, while the lower classes retained Ukrainian folk culture to a significant extent. According to the census of 1897, of the city's approximately 240,000 people approximately 56% of the population spoke the Russian language, 23% spoke the Ukrainian language, 12.5% spoke Yiddish, 7% spoke Polish and 1% spoke the Belarusian language. Despite the Russian cultural dominance in the city, enthusiasts among ethnic Ukrainian nobles, military and merchants made recurrent attempts to preserve native culture in the city (by clandestine book-printing, amateur theater, folk studies etc.).

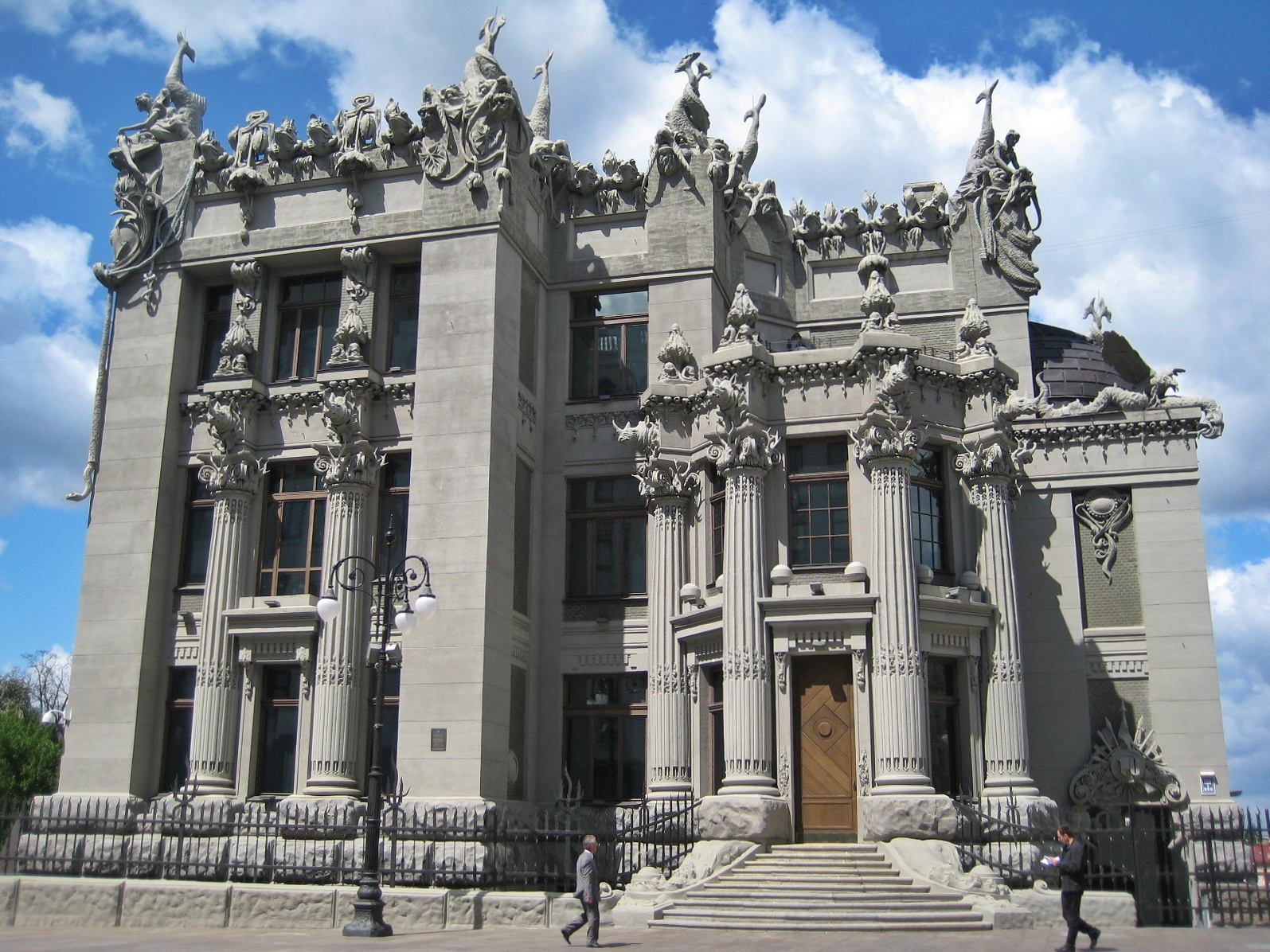
House with Chimaeras, built in 1902 by the Polish architect Władysław Horodecki

During the Russian industrial revolution in the late 19th century, Kyiv became an important trade and transportation center of the Russian Empire, specializing in sugar and grain export by railroad and on the Dnieper river. By 1900, the city had also become a significant industrial center, having a population of 250,000. Landmarks of that period include the railway infrastructure, the foundation of numerous educational and cultural facilities as well as notable architectural monuments (mostly merchant-oriented, i.e. Brodsky Choral Synagogue).

At that time, a large Jewish community emerged in the city, developing its own ethnic culture and business interests. This was stimulated by the prohibition of Jewish settlement in Russia proper (Moscow and Saint Petersburg) — as well as further eastwards. Expelled from Kyiv in 1654, Jews probably were not able to settle in the city again until the early 1790s. On 2 December 1827 Nicholas I of Russia expelled seven hundred Jews from the city. In 1836, the Pale of Settlement banned Jews from Kyiv as well, fencing off the city's districts from the Jewish population. Thus, at mid-century Jewish merchants who came to fairs in the city could stay for up to six months. In 1881 and 1905, notorious pogroms in the city resulted in the death of about 100 Jews.

The development of aviation (both military and amateur) became another notable mark of distinction of Kyiv in the early 20th century. Prominent aviation figures of that period include Pyotr Nesterov (aerobatics pioneer) and Igor Sikorsky, both of whom hailed from the city. The world's first helicopter was built and tested in Kyiv by Sikorsky, and in 1892 the first electric tram line of the Russian Empire was established in Kyiv.

== Ukrainian War of Independence ==
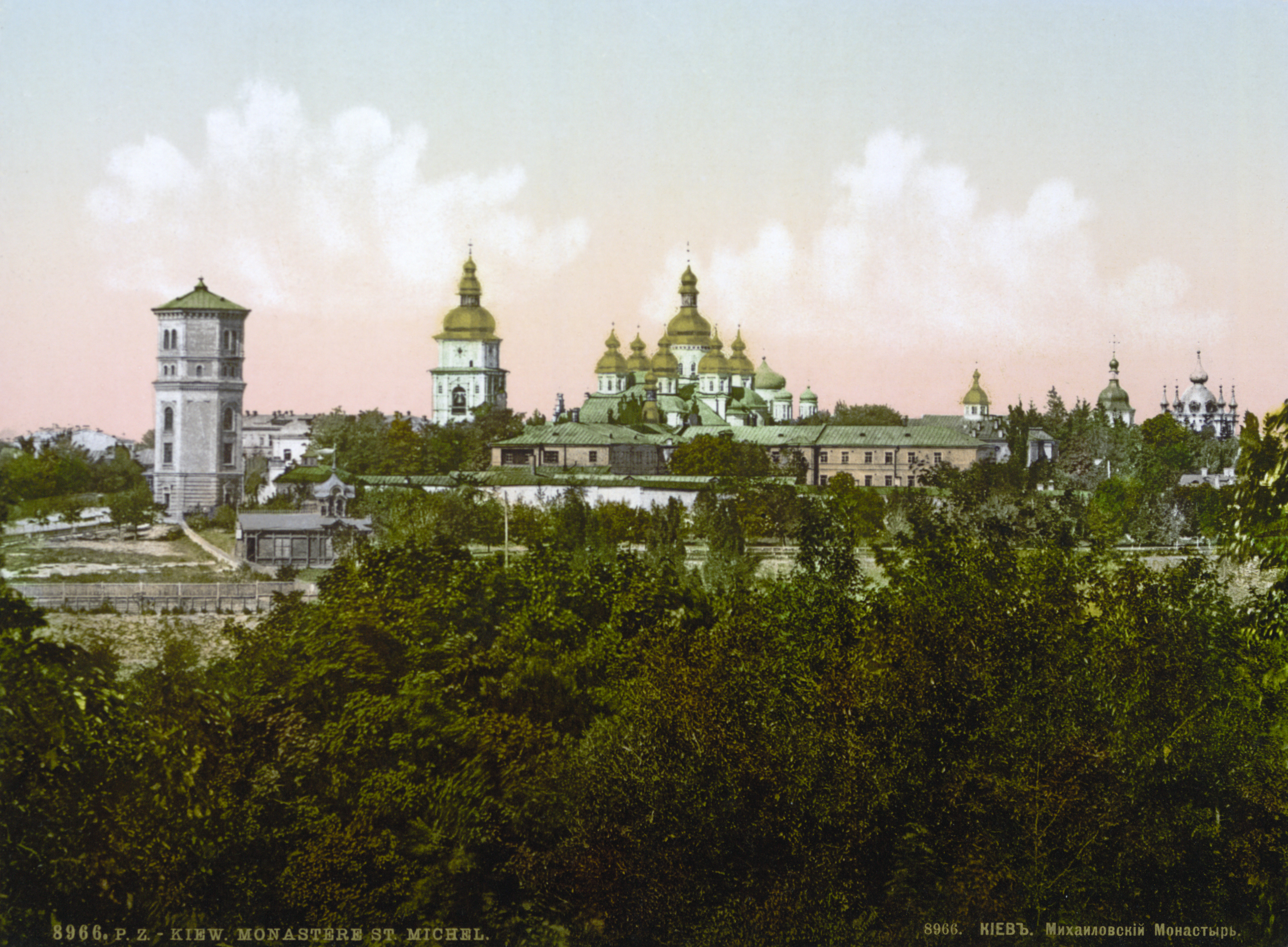
St. Michael's Monastery, in the city centre, c.1890–1905.

In 1917, the Central Rada (Tsentralna Rada), a Ukrainian self-governing body headed by the historian Mykhailo Hrushevsky, was established in the city. Later that year, Ukrainian autonomy was declared. During the period of dual power this body competed for authority with the Russian Army loyal to the Russian Provisional Government and later with the Bolsheviks.

On 7 November 1917, it was transformed into an independent Ukrainian People's Republic with the capital in Kyiv. During this short period of independence, the city experienced rapid growth of its cultural and political status. An Academy of Sciences and professional Ukrainian-language theaters and libraries were established by the new government.

Later the city became a war zone in the lasting and bloody struggle between Ukrainian, Polish and Russian Bolshevik governments in the time of the Russian Revolution, the Ukrainian-Soviet War, the Polish-Ukrainian War and the Polish-Soviet War.

After the "January Uprising" on 29 January 1918 was extinguished, Bolshevik Red Guards took the city in the Battle of Kyiv, forcing the Central Rada to flee to Zhytomyr. The Bolsheviks established Kharkiv as the capital of the Ukrainian Soviet Republic. By March, the city had been occupied by the Imperial German Army under the terms of the Treaty of Brest-Litovsk.

With the withdrawal of German troops after the end of World War I, an independent Ukraine was declared in the capital city under Symon Petliura. Red Army forces once again recaptured the city in the January 1919 battle of Kyiv, taking the time to conduct a city-census of Kyiv. In August 1919, the White armies recaptured the city, before losing it to the bolsheviks again in the Battle of Kyiv of December 1919.

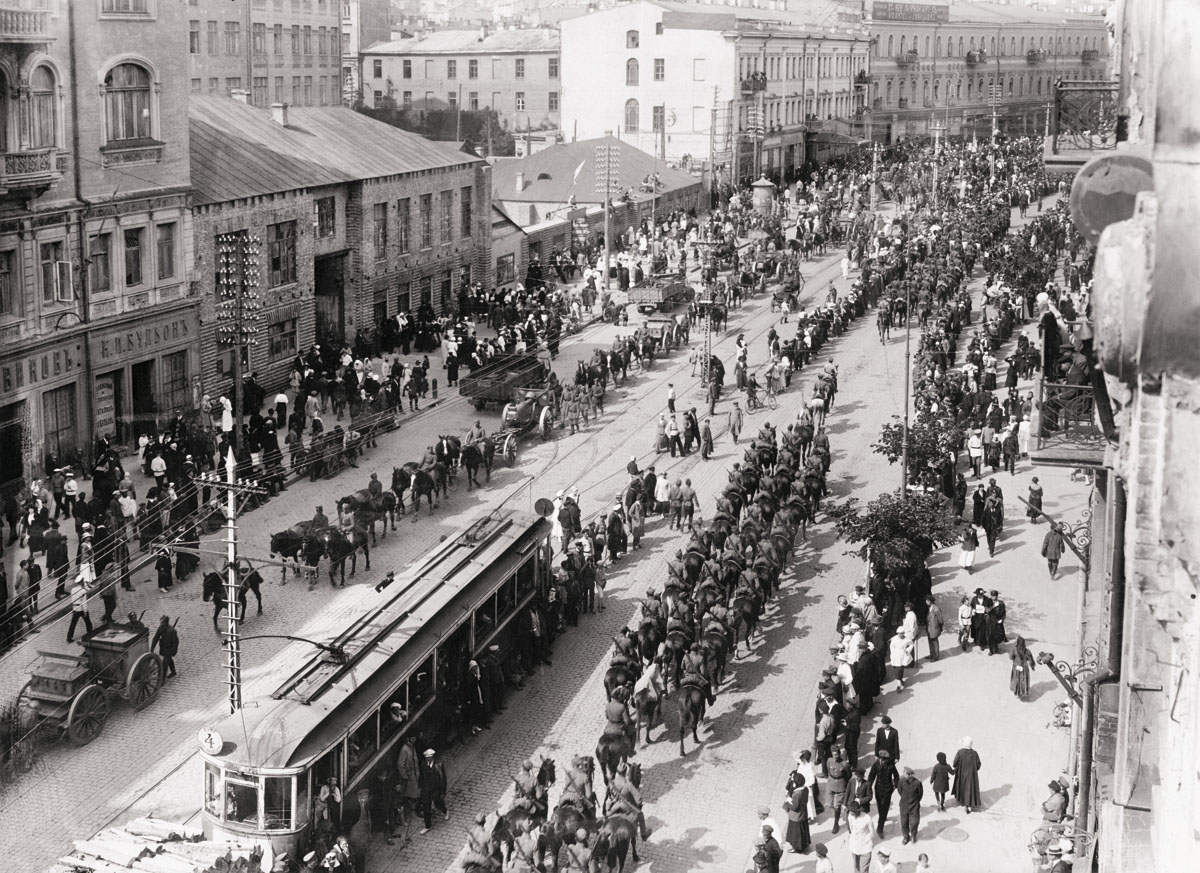
Polish-Ukrainian military parade in 1920

It was then briefly occupied by the White armies before the Soviets once more took control in 1920. On 7 May 1920, during the Russo-Polish War it was captured by the Polish Army, and on 9 May it was the site of the Kyiv Victory Parade, a joint Polish-Ukrainian military parade in the liberated city, but the Poles were soon driven out by the Red Army.

== Ukrainian Soviet Socialist Republic ==
=== 1920s ===
After the Ukrainian SSR was formed in 1922, Kharkiv was declared its capital. Kyiv, being an important industrial center, continued to grow. In 1925, the first public buses ran on city streets, and ten years later the first trolleybuses were introduced. In 1927 the suburban areas of Darnytsia, Lanky, Chokolivka, and Mykilska Slobidka were included into the city. In 1932, the city became the administrative center of newly created Kyiv Oblast.

=== 1930s ===
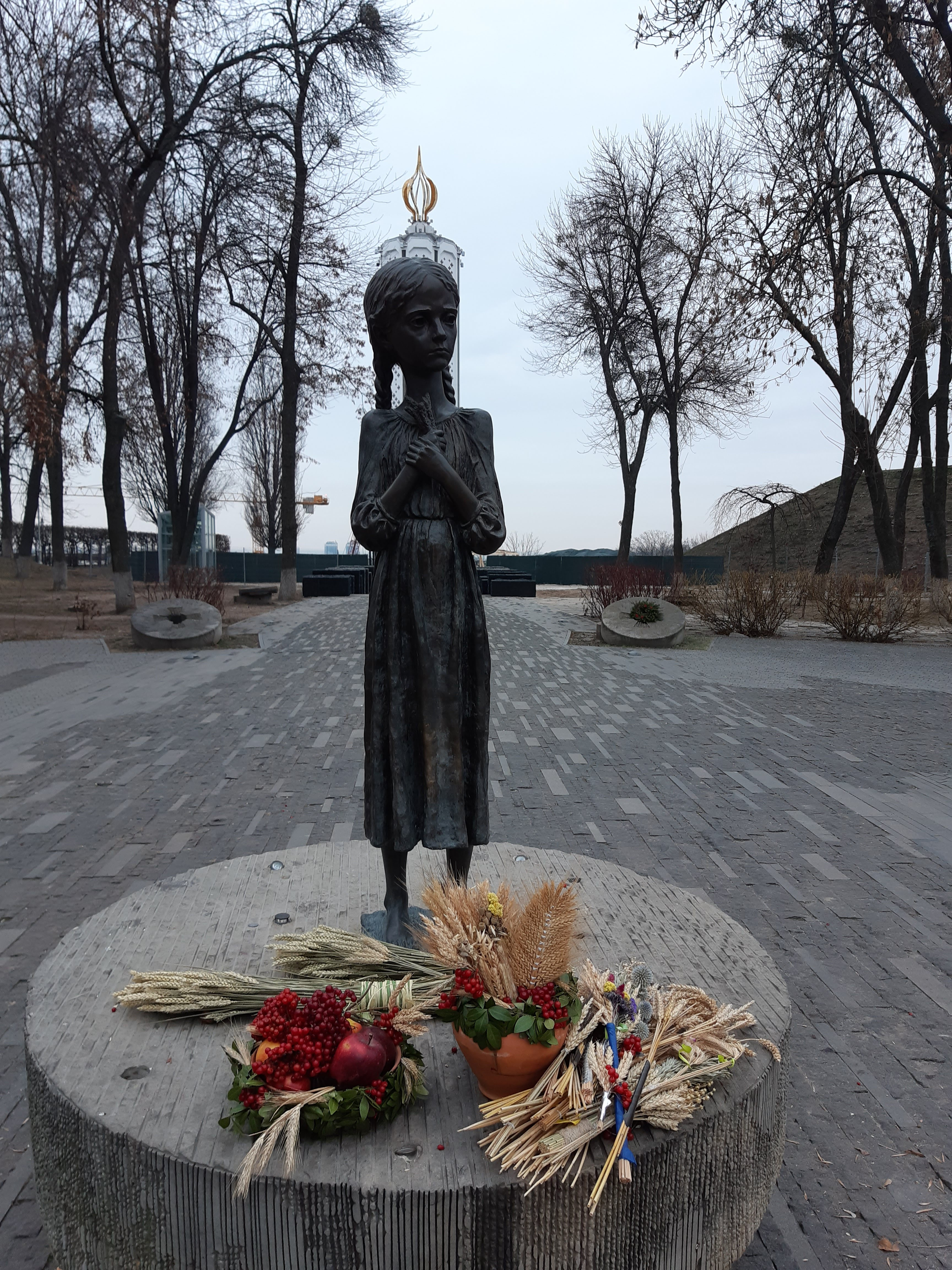
National Museum of the Holodomor-Genocide created after the collapse of the USSR.

In the 1930s, the city suffered terribly from famine and from Stalinization. In 1932–33, the city population, like most of the other Ukrainian territories, suffered from the Holodomor. In Kyiv, bread and other food products were distributed to workers by food cards according to daily norm, but even with cards, bread was in limited supply, and citizens were standing overnight in lines to obtain it.

In 1934 the capital of Ukrainian SSR was moved from Kharkiv to Kyiv. The goal was to fashion a new proletariat utopia based on Stalin's blueprints. The city's architecture was made over, but a much greater impact on the population was Soviet social policy, which involved large-scale purges, coercion, and rapid movement toward totalitarianism in which dissent and non-communist organizations were not tolerated.

In the 1930s the process of destruction of churches and monuments, which started in the 1920s, reached the most dramatic turn. Churches and structures that were hundreds of years old, such as St. Michael's Golden-Domed Cathedral and the Fountain of Samson, were demolished. Others, such as Saint Sophia Cathedral, were confiscated. The city's population continued to increase mostly by migrants. The migration changed the ethnic demographics of the city from the previous Russian-Ukrainian parity to predominantly Ukrainian, although Russian remained the dominant language.

In the 1930s, the city inhabitants also suffered from the controversial Soviet political policy of that time. While encouraging lower-class Ukrainians to pursue careers and develop their culture (see Ukrainization), the Communist regime soon began harsh oppression of Ukraine's political freedom, autonomy and religion. Recurring political trials were organized in the city to purge "Ukrainian nationalists", "Western spies" and opponents of Joseph Stalin inside the Bolshevik party. During this time, numerous historic churches were destroyed or vandalized and the clergy repressed.

In the late 1930s, clandestine mass executions began in Kyiv. Thousands of city residents (mostly intellectuals and party activists) were arrested in the night, hurriedly court-martialed, shot and buried in mass graves. The main execution sites were Babi Yar and the Bykivnia forest. Tens of thousands were sentenced to GULAG camps. In the same time, the city's economy continued to grow, following Stalin's industrialization policy.

== World War II ==
Following the Soviet invasion of Poland at the start of World War II in 1939, the staff of the Consulate of Poland in Kyiv was arrested by the Soviets in breach of international law. In 1940 it was the site of Soviet executions of Polish officers and intelligentsia committed as part of the Katyn massacre.

During the Second World War, Nazi Germany occupied the city on 19 September 1941 (see the Battle of Kyiv). Overall, the battle proved disastrous for the Soviet side but it significantly delayed the German advances. The delay also allowed the evacuation of all significant industrial enterprises from Kyiv to the central and eastern parts of the Soviet Union, away from the hostilities, where they played a major role in arming the Red Army fighting the Nazis (see, for example, the Arsenal Factory).

Before the evacuation, the Red Army planted more than ten thousand mines throughout the city, controlled by wireless detonators. On 24 September, when the German invaders had settled into the city, the mines were detonated, causing many of the major buildings to collapse, and setting the city ablaze for five days. More than a thousand Germans were killed.

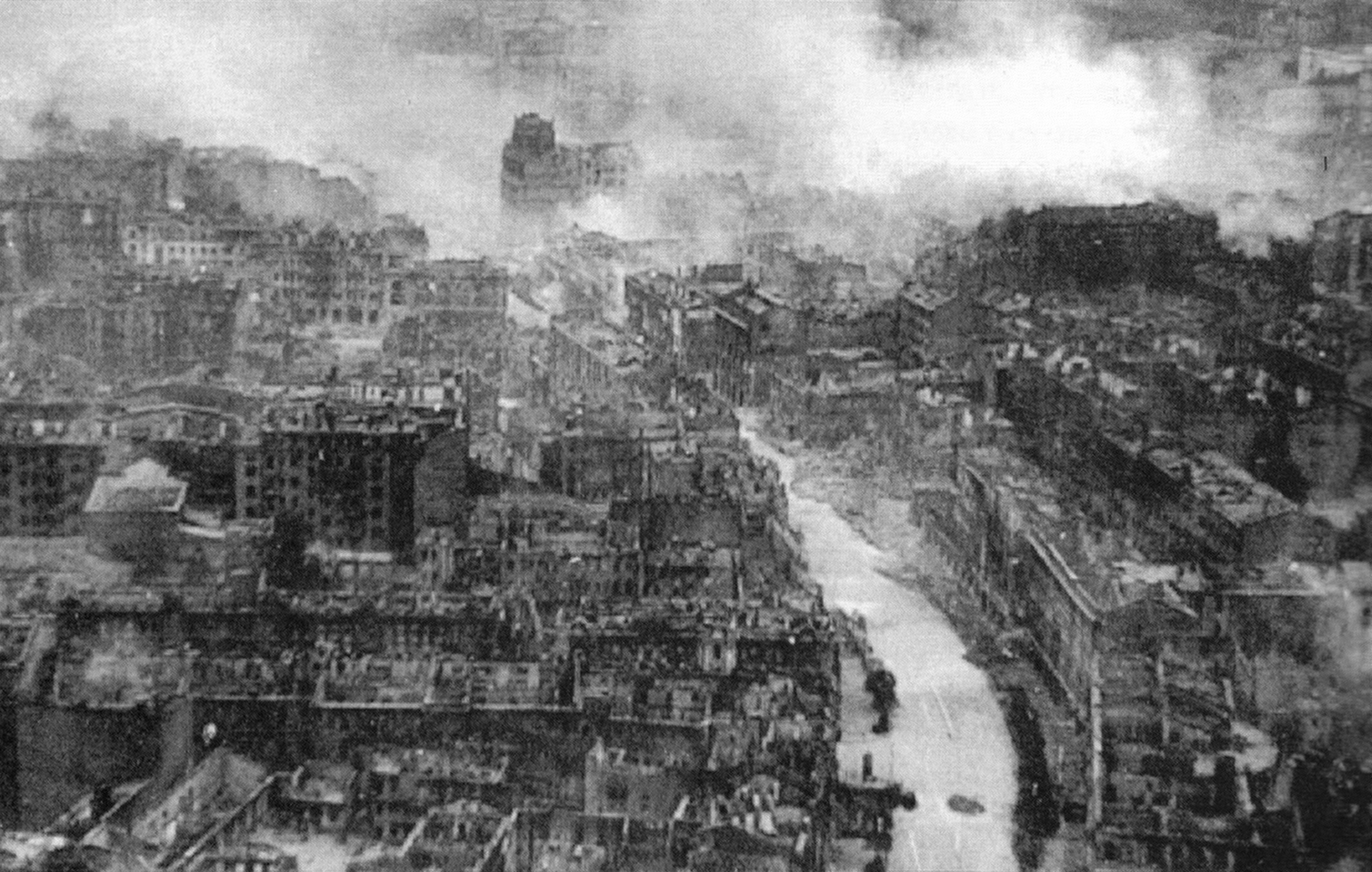
Kyiv, as seen during World War II.

Babi Yar, a location in Kyiv, became a site of one of the most infamous Nazi WWII war crimes. During two days in September 1941, at least 33,771 Jews from Kyiv and its suburbs were massacred at Babi Yar by the SS Einsatzgruppen, according to their own reports. Babi Yar was a site of additional mass murders of captured Soviet citizens over the following years, including Ukrainians, Romani, POWs and anyone suspected in aiding the resistance movement, perhaps as many as 60,000 additional people.

In the "Hunger Plan" prepared ahead of the Nazi invasion of the Soviet Union, with the aim of ensuring that Germans were given priority over food supplies at the expense of everyone else, the inhabitants of the city were defined as "superfluous eaters" who were to be "gotten rid of" by the cutting off of all food supplies to the city – the food to be diverted to feeding the Wehrmacht troops and Germany's own population. Luckily for city inhabitants, this part of the "Hunger Plan" was never fully implemented.

An underground resistance quickly established by local patriots was active until the liberation from Nazi occupation. During the war, the city was heavily bombarded, especially in the beginning of the war and the city was largely destroyed including many of its architectural landmarks (only one building remained standing on the Khreschatyk, a main street).

While the whole of Ukraine was a '[Third] Reich commissariat', under the Nazi Reichskommissar Erich Koch, the region surrounding Kiew (as it is spelled in German) was one of the six subordinate 'general districts', February 1942 – 1943 Generalbezirk Kiew, under Generalkommissar Waldemar Magunia (b. 1902 – d. 1974, also NSDAP)

The city was liberated by the Red Army on 6 November 1943. For its role during the War the city was later awarded the title Hero City.

== Post-war Ukrainian SSR ==
Despite the end of the war, on 4–7 September 1945 an antisemitic pogrom occurred around one hundred Jews were beaten, of whom thirty-six were hospitalized and five died of wounds.

The postwar period in Kyiv was one of rapid socio-economic growth and political pacification. The arms race of the Cold War caused the establishment of a powerful technological complex in the city (both research and development and production), specializing in aerospace, microelectronics and precision optics. Dozens of industrial companies were created employing highly skilled personnel. Sciences and technology became the main issues of the city's intellectual life. Dozens of research institutes in various fields formed the Academy of Sciences of the Ukrainian SSR.

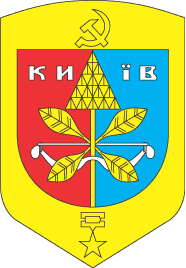
Coat of arms of Kyiv during the Soviet era.

The city also became an important military center of the Soviet Union. More than a dozen military schools and academies were established, also specializing in high-tech warfare (see also Soviet education). This created a labor force demand which caused migration from rural areas of both Ukraine and Russia. Large suburbs and an extensive transportation infrastructure were built to accommodate the growing population. However, many rural-type buildings and groves have survived on the city's hills, creating Kyiv's image as one of the world's greenest cities.

The city grew tremendously in the 1950s through 1980s. Some significant urban achievements of this period include establishment of the Metro, building new river bridges (connecting the old city with Left Bank suburbs), and Boryspil Airport (the city's second, and later international airport).

Systematic oppression of pro-Ukrainian intellectuals, dubbed as "nationalists", was carried under the propaganda campaign against Ukrainian nationalism threatening the Soviet way of life. In cultural sense it marked a new wave of Russification in the 1970s, when universities and research facilities were gradually and secretly discouraged from using Ukrainian. Switching to Russian, as well as choosing to send children to Russian schools was expedient for educational and career advancement.

Thus the city underwent another cycle of gradual Russification.

Every attempt to dispute Soviet rule was harshly oppressed, especially concerning democracy, Ukrainian SSR's self-government, and ethnic-religious problems. Campaigns against "Ukrainian bourgeois nationalism" and "Western influence" in Kyiv's educational and scientific institutions were mounted repeatedly. Due to limited career prospects in Kyiv, Moscow became a preferable life destination for many Kyivans (and Ukrainians as a whole), especially for artists and other creative intellectuals. Dozens of show-business celebrities in modern Russia were born in Kyiv.

In the 1970s and later 1980s–1990s, given special permission from the Soviet government, a significant part of the city's Jews migrated to Israel and the West.

The Chernobyl accident of 1986 affected city life tremendously, both environmentally and socio-politically. Some areas of the city have been polluted by radioactive dust. However, inhabitants of Kyiv were neither informed about the actual threat of the accident, nor recognized as its victims. Moreover, on 1 May 1986 (a few days after the accident), local CPSU leaders ordered Kyivans (including hundreds of children) to take part in a mass civil parade in the city's center—"to prevent panic". Later, thousands of refugees from accident zone were resettled in Kyiv.

== Independent Ukraine ==
=== Capital of an independent nation ===
After 57 years as the capital of the Ukrainian Soviet Socialist Republic within the Soviet Union, the city became the capital of an independent Ukraine in 1991.

The city was the site of mass protests over the 2004 Ukrainian presidential election by supporters of opposition candidate Viktor Yushchenko beginning on 22 November 2004 at Maidan Nezalezhnosti, Independence Square. Much smaller counter-protests in favor of Viktor Yanukovych also took place.

The city hosted the Eurovision Song Contest 2005 on 19 and 21 May in the Palace of Sports.

Kyiv has co-hosted the UEFA Euro 2012.

In February 2014, the city was the site of the Revolution of Dignity, also known as the Maidan Revolution.

In 2014, Vitali Klitschko, former professional boxer, became the city's mayor.

=== 2022 Russian invasion ===
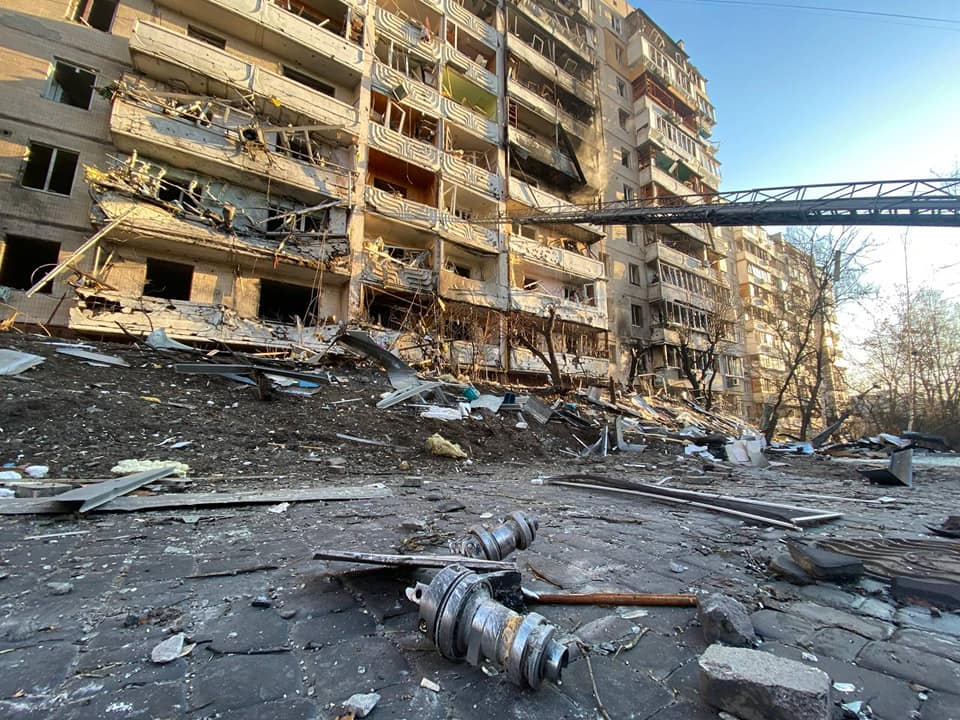
War damages after Russian shelling in 2022

In 2022, during the Russian invasion of Ukraine, a Russian offensive attempted to surround and besiege the capital city, and multiple teams of Russian soldiers and mercenaries entered the city to assassinate president Volodymyr Zelenskyy in what was widely reported to be an attempt at regime change. Due to Kyiv's proximity to the Belarusian border, the Russians attempted to invade Kyiv from Belarus, at the Vilcha border crossing, and although they managed to capture north-Kyiv Oblast, and many cities within it, up to the edge of Kyiv, they never managed to occupy any part of Kyiv. However, Kyiv city still suffered great losses from the attacks, such as missile strikes that killed multiple people, with the city's inner metro stations being used as air raid shelters. On 2 April 2022, the Russian assault of Kyiv Oblast was defeated and Ukraine re-occupied the whole of Kyiv Oblast. After Russian forces' withdrawal, evidence was discovered of systematic war crimes, especially in the satellite city of Bucha. However, despite the withdrawal of the Russian forces from Kyiv Oblast, attacks on Kyiv continued, although they did significantly decline. Since 2022, a total of 30 different air strikes have been executed on Kyiv (as of October 2023).

Major air strikes include:

- The mass missile strike, which hit the city on 10 October 2022, killing 8.
- The attack on 16 May 2023, when Kyiv was showered by 18 different Russian missiles and 3 attack drones.
- The drone attack on 2 January 2023, when 60 drones entered Kyiv, killing a person.
- The 26 February 2022 air strike, when Russian artillery shelled the city for over 30 minutes.
- The 1 March 2022 missile strike, when 2 missiles destroyed part of the Kyiv TV tower, disabling some forms of communication, and killing 5 people.
- The 8 July 2024 missile strike, when 30 missiles damaged residential buildings and the Okhmatdyt children's hospital, killing 22.
- The July 2 2026 missile strike, killing at least 30 people and injuring over 90 others. This strike contained the largest number of missiles fired on Kyiv.

Russian forces have targeted medical infrastructure across Ukraine, with the Ukrainian Health Ministry reporting that thousands of facilities have been damaged or destroyed, including hospitals and clinics in Kyiv. Large strikes also knocked out power, heating, and water systems for large parts of the city during harsh winter conditions, and caused major humanitarian challenges. Ukrainian officials condemned these attacks and called for an increased international support effort to strengthen air defenses and protect Ukrainian civilians.

== See also ==
- Timeline of Kyiv

== Bibliography ==
=== Primary sources ===
- Primary Chronicle (PVL; 1110s).
  - Cross, Samuel Hazzard; Sherbowitz-Wetzor, Olgerd P. (1953). The Russian Primary Chronicle, Laurentian Text. Translated and edited by Samuel Hazzard Cross and Olgerd P. Sherbowitz-Wetzor (PDF). Cambridge, Massachusetts: The Mediaeval Academy of America. p. 325. (First edition published in 1930. The first 50 pages are a scholarly introduction.)
    - Cross, Samuel Hazzard; Sherbowitz-Wetzor, Olgerd P. (2013) [1953]. SLA 218. Ukrainian Literature and Culture. Excerpts from The Rus' Primary Chronicle (Povest vremennykh let, PVL) (PDF). Toronto: Electronic Library of Ukrainian Literature, University of Toronto. p. 16. Archived from the original (PDF) on 30 May 2014.
  - Ostrowski, Donald; Birnbaum, David J. (7 December 2014). "Rus' primary chronicle critical edition – Interlinear line-level collation". pvl.obdurodon.org (in Church Slavic). Archived from the original on 28 April 2025. – A 2014 improved digitised version of the 2002/2003 Ostrowski et al. edition.
  - Thuis, Hans (2015). Nestorkroniek. De oudste geschiedenis van het Kievse Rijk [Nestor Chronicle: the oldest history of the Kievan Realm] (in Dutch). Nijmegen: Uitgeverij Vantilt. p. 304. ISBN 9789460042287.

=== Literature ===
- Artemenko, I.I. (1982). История Киева в трех томах, четырех книгах. Том первый. Древний и средневековый Киев [History of Kiev in three volumes, four books. Volume one. Ancient and Medieval Kiev] (in Russian). Kiev: Naukova Dumka. p. 408.
- (in Ukrainian) Історія міста Києва [History of the city of Kyiv]. Kyiv: Institute of History, Academy of Sciences of Ukrainian SSR, 1960.
- (in Ukrainian) F. Berlynskyi. Історія міста Києва [History of the city of Kyiv]. Kyiv: Naukova Dumka, 1991.
- (in Ukrainian) Історія міста Києва з найдавніших часів до 2000 року: науково-допоміжний бібліографічний покажчик у виданнях від XVII ст. до 2000 року: У 3-х т., 14-ти кн. [History of the city of Kyiv from the earliest times to 2000: scientific and auxiliary bibliographic index in publications from the seventeenth century to 2000: In 3 vols. 14 books] (2009–2010). Institute of History of Ukraine, National Academy of Sciences of Ukraine.
- Cybriwsky, Roman Adrian. Kyiv, Ukraine: the city of domes and demons from the collapse of socialism to the mass uprising of 2013–2014 (Amsterdam UP, 2016) online.
- Cybriwsky, Roman Adrian. "Whose city? Kyiv and its river after socialism." Geografiska Annaler: Series B, Human Geography 98.4 (2016): 367–379.
- Estraikh, Gennady. "From Yehupets Jargonists to Kyiv modernists: The rise of a Yiddish literary Centre, 1880s‐1914." East European Jewish Affairs 30.1 (2000): 17–38.
- Hamm, Michael F (1993). Kiev: a portrait, 1800–1917. Princeton University Press. ISBN 0-691-03253-X. online review
- Luckyj, George Stephen Nestor. Young Ukraine: The Brotherhood of Saints Cyril and Methodius in Kiev, 1845–1847 (University of Ottawa Press, 1991).
- Martin, Janet (2007). Medieval Russia: 980–1584. Second Edition. E-book. Cambridge: Cambridge University Press. ISBN 978-0-511-36800-4.
- Meir, Natan M. Kiev: Jewish Metropolis, a History, 1859–1914 (Indiana UP, 2010) 403pp Examines political, religious, demographic, cultural, and other aspects of Kyiv's Jews, from the official readmission of Jews to the city to the beginning of World War I.
- Meir, Natan M. "Jews, Ukrainians, and Russians in Kiev: Intergroup relations in late imperial associational life." Slavic Review (2006): 475–501. online
- Ostrowski, Don (30 December 2015). "The Move of the Metropolitan from Kiev in 1299". Academia.edu. p. 26.
- Ostrowski, Donald (2018). "Was There a Riurikid Dynasty in Early Rus'?". Canadian-American Slavic Studies. 52 (1): 30–49. doi:10.1163/22102396-05201009.
- Pavlychko, Solomea. Letters from Kiev (1992).
- Plokhy, Serhii (2006). The Origins of the Slavic Nations: Premodern Identities in Russia, Ukraine, and Belarus (PDF). New York: Cambridge University Press. pp. 10–15. ISBN 978-0-521-86403-9. Archived (PDF) from the original on 6 June 2011.
- Surh, Gerald. "The Role of Civil and Military Commanders During the 1905 Pogroms in Odessa and Kiev." Jewish Social Studies: History, Culture, and Society 15.3 (2009): 39–55 online.
