= John Cary =

English cartographer

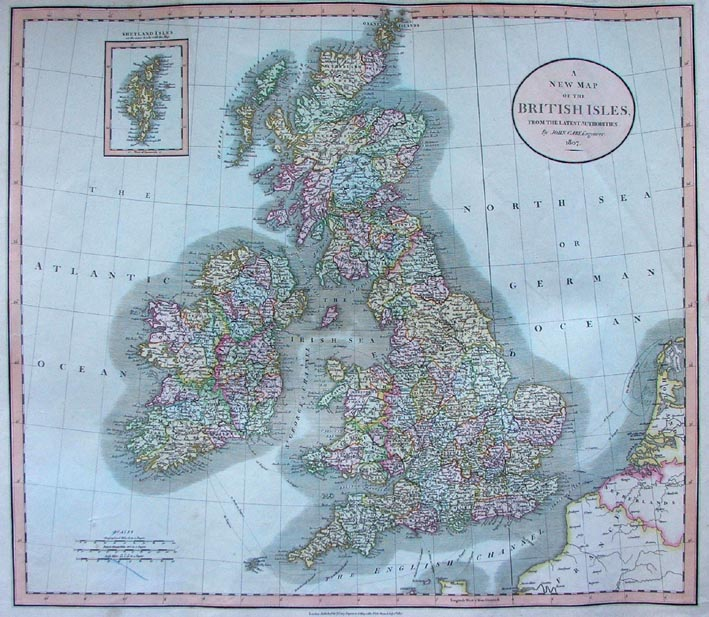
A New Map of the British Isles, from the Latest Authorities 1807, from John Cary's New Universal Atlas

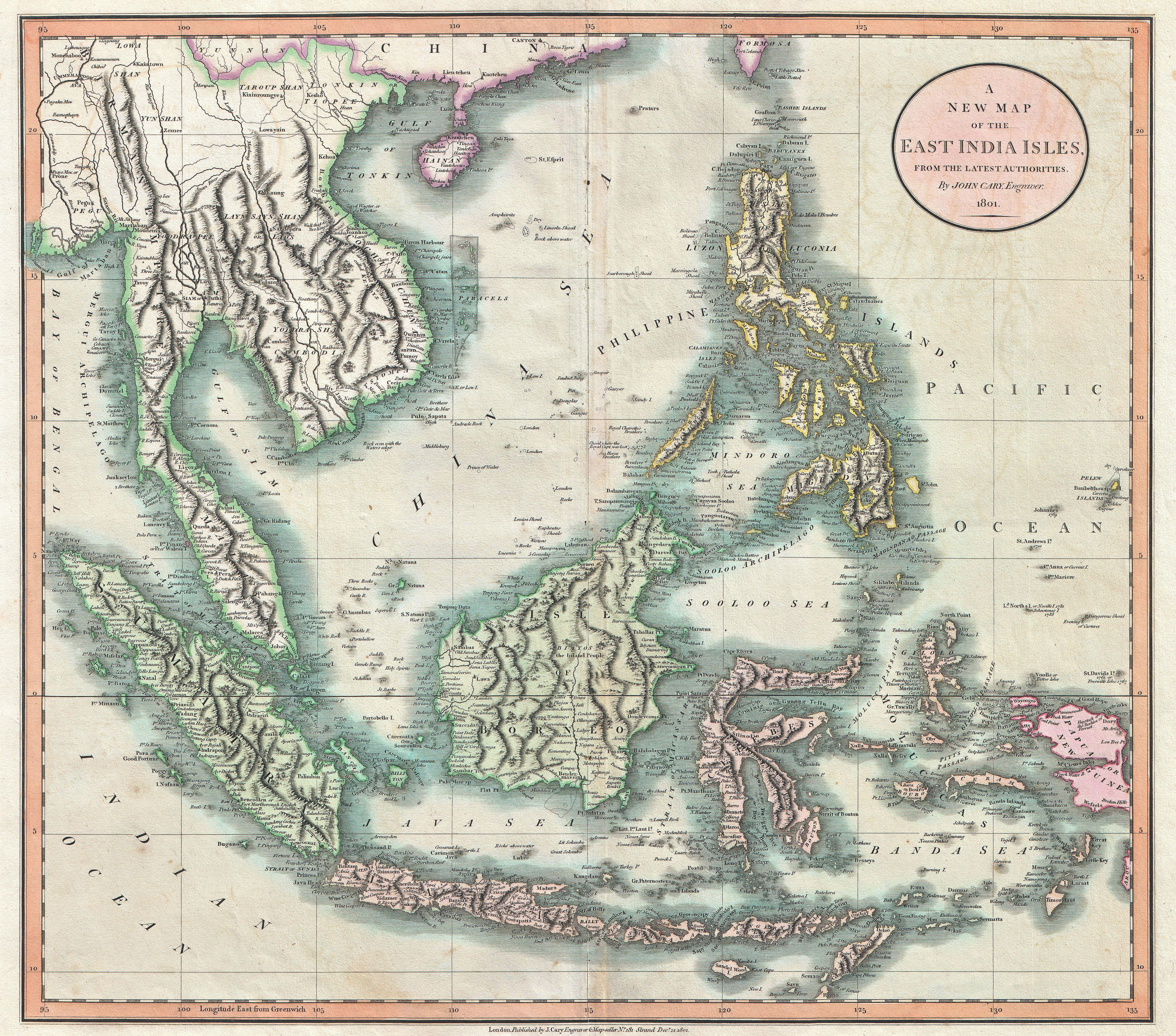
An 1801 map of the East Indies

John Cary (c. 1754 – 1835) was an English cartographer.

== Life ==
Cary served his apprenticeship as an engraver in London, before setting up his own business in the Strand in 1783. He soon gained a reputation for his maps and globes, his atlas, The New and Correct English Atlas published in 1787, becoming a standard reference work in England.

In 1794 Cary was commissioned by the Postmaster General to survey England's roads. This resulted in Cary's New Itinerary (1798), a map of all the major roads in England and Wales. He also produced Ordnance Survey maps prior to 1805.

In his later life he collaborated on geological maps with the geologist William Smith. His business was eventually taken over by G. F. Cruchley (1822–1880).

== Works ==
Cary's major works include:

- Actual Survey of the country fifteen miles around London (1786)
- New and Correct English Atlas (1787)
- Camden's Britannia (1789) - maps for 1789 and 1806 editions
- Cary's Survey of the High Roads from London (1790)
- Cary's Traveller's Companion (1790)
- New Maps of England and Wales with part of Scotland (1794)
- Inland Navigation; or Select Plans of the Several Navigable Canals throughout Britain (1795)
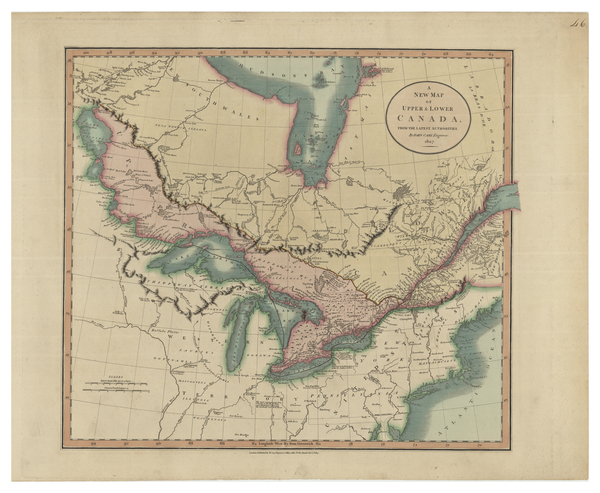
  A New Map of Upper & Lower Canada, from the Latest Authorities (1807)
- Cary's New Itinerary (1798)
- A New Map of Scotland (1801)
- New British Atlas (1805), with John Stockdale
- A New map of chinese & independent Tartary (1806)
- Cary's New Universal Atlas (1808)
- Cary's English Atlas (1809)
- New Elementary Atlas (1813)
- Cary's New Itinerary (1817)
