= History of Kyiv (1362–1657) =

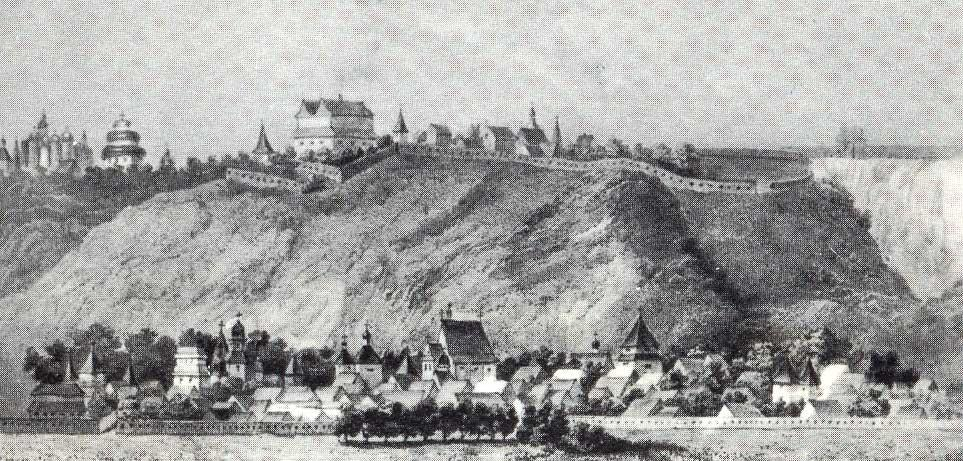
View of Kyiv from the Northeast (1651) by Abraham van Westerveld. View of Podil (Lower City). In the centre: the Dominican Church of St. Nicholas (with a Gothic roof). This drawing can be considered the only documentary image of this area as it was in the mid-17th century.

The history of Kyiv (Note: Ruthenian/Middle Ukrainian: Кї́євъ Kíjev or Кї́ѣвъ Kýjiv. Modern Ukrainian: Київ, romanized: Kyiv. Lithuanian: Kyjivas. Polish: Kijów. Traditional English-language literature before 1991: Kiev. See Names of Kyiv for more information.) from the Battle of Blue Waters (1362/3) until the end of the Khmelnytsky Uprising (1648–1657) encompasses Kyiv's period as part of the Grand Duchy of Lithuania (1362/3–1569), the Crown of the Kingdom of Poland within the larger Polish–Lithuanian Commonwealth (1569–1648), and the early revolutionary period of the Cossack Hetmanate during the Khmelnytsky Uprising. This Lithuanian–Polish–Cossack timeframe was preceded by Kiev in the Golden Horde period (1240–1362/3), and was succeeded by the history of Kyiv (1657–1811), at the times of the Ruin (1657–1687), the hetmanship of Ivan Mazepa (1687–1708), and the gradual liquidation of the autonomy of the Cossack Hetmanate (completed in 1764).

The complex nature of urban life in Kiev was a consequence of the city's border location. In general, the city did not lose its importance as a major commercial, economic and cultural centre of the Ukrainian lands. It was the capital of the Principality of Kiev until 1471, and thereafter of the Kiev Voivodeship. On the other hand, Chyhyryn would be chosen as the capital city of the early Cossack Hetmanate in 1649.

== History ==
=== Late 14th century ===
The Principality of Kiev in 1385, during the reign of Vladimir Olgerdovich, within the Grand Duchy of Lithuania

Following the Battle of Blue Waters (1362/3), Algirdas gained control of Kyiv and the Duchy of Podolia. Vladimir Olgerdovich (Volodymyr Olherdovych) was Grand Prince of Kiev from 1362 to 1394. During his reign, the Principality of Kiev extended across the lands of Kiev, Chernigov (modern Chernihiv), and parts of Polesia (Polissia). It included the cities of Zhytomyr, Vruchi, Turaŭ, Mogilev, Bryansk, Trubchevsk, Novhorod-Siverskyi, Kursk, Chernigov, Rylsk, Putyvl, Korsun, and Pereiaslav. Vladimir pursued a policy aimed at the independence of the Kievan Principality and expressed the interests of local secular and ecclesiastical feudal lords. During this time, Kyiv Castle was built on Zamkova Hora, and the Kievan prince minted his own coins. During this period, nomads rarely appeared in the Kievan region. This contributed to the development of agriculture, trade, and crafts in the Dnieper region and Kiev in particular.

Given the complex geopolitical situation of the Grand Duchy of Lithuania in 1385, the Union of Krewo was concluded between the Grand Duchy and the Kingdom of Poland, according to which, through the dynastic marriage of the Lithuanian Grand Duke Jagiełło and Queen (Note: Jadwiga was officially crowned as "King of Poland" – in regem Poloniae coronata, but her title was "Queen of Poland" - Hedvigis Dei gratia regina Poloniae.) Jadwiga of Poland, Jagiełło received the title of King of Poland, and Lithuania and Poland entered into a personal union.

At a meeting in Belz in 1392, it was decided to liquidate the appanage principalities in the Ruthenian lands by exchanging lands. Skirgaila (previously the Duke of Trakai, 1382–1395) gave Vytautas the Great his own lands in Lithuania and the Principality of Polotsk (after 1508 the Polotsk Voivodeship). In return, Skirgaila Olgerdovich received the Kievan region, as well as part of Podolia and the Principality of Volhynia (Volyn'). At the end of 1394, Prince Vladimir Olgerdovich of Kiev received a small portion of Polesia with the towns of Kapyl and Slutsk. In the autumn of 1395, Skirgaila carried out a successful campaign against the Golden Horde, resulting in the annexation of Cherkasy and Zvenyhorod.

After Skirgaila's death in 1397, Vytautas became the sole ruler of the Grand Duchy of Lithuania, while the Kievan region was ruled by Ivan Olshansky from 1397 to 1401. In the last years of the 14th century, the Grand Duchy of Lithuania became the most powerful state in Eastern Europe.

=== 15th century ===
Grand Duke Vytautas initiated several campaigns against the Golden Horde, even after his defeat at the Battle of the Vorskla River in 1399. Kiev became the main centre for gathering the forces of Vytautas and his allies. Vytautas strengthened the defensive structures of Kiev. During 1401–1433, the Olshansky princes Andrey Olshansky and Mykhailo Olshansky reigned in Kiev. Vytautas' active interference in the internal politics of the Golden Horde led to a large campaign by the forces of the Horde emir Edigu against the Kievan region and Kiev itself in 1416. Podil and the Upper City were captured, but the Kyiv Castle held out.

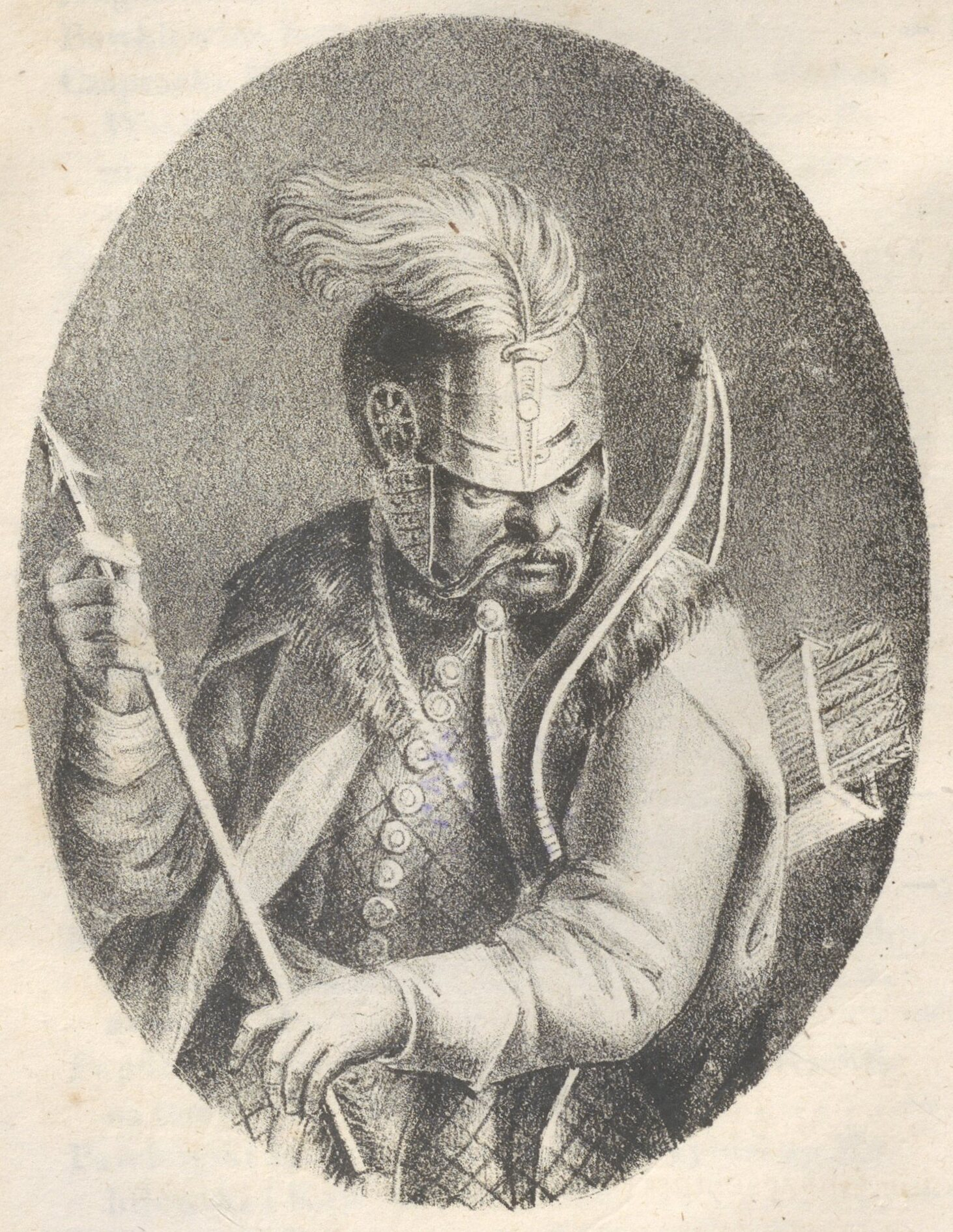
Švitrigaila, Grand Duke of Lithuania, Grand Duke of Ruthenia

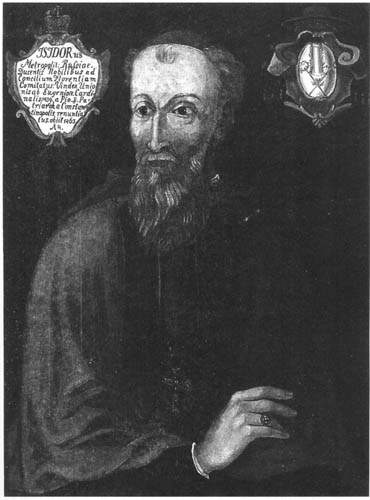
Isidore, Metropolitan of Kiev, Galicia and all Rus'

After Vytautas' death in 1430, the elected Grand Duke of Lithuania Švitrigaila began a policy of breaking the union with Poland and restoring the independence of the Grand Duchy of Lithuania and Rus'. Kiev became the main base of Prince Švitrigaila's 'Ruthenian party' on the eve of the Lithuanian Civil War (1432–1438). As a result of this war, Kiev, Siveria, Volhynia, Podolia, Polotsk, Smolensk and other Ruthenian lands united into the Grand Duchy of Ruthenia (1432–1435), independent from Kraków and Vilnius, and recognised the authority of Švitrigaila. In 1435, Švitrigaila lost the Battle of Wiłkomierz against his rival Sigismund Kęstutaitis, resulting in the collapse of the Grand Duchy of Ruthenia and the Principality of Kiev. In 1436, the people of Kiev rebelled, and in the same year, the Kievan voivode Yursha defeated the Lithuanian army near Kiev. Nevertheless, Švitrigaila was losing his influence in the Ruthenian principalities, and attempted to reconcile with Poland in September 1437: he would reign the lands that still supported him (chiefly Kiev and Volhynia) and after his death the territories would pass to the King of Poland. However, the Polish Senate did not ratify this treaty under strong protest from Sigismund Kęstutaitis. Švitrigaila retreated to Moldavia in 1438.

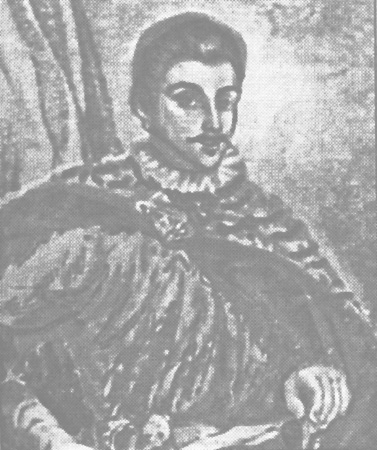
Semen Olelkovich, the last Prince of Kiev (r. 1455–1470)

In 1440, the Kievan Principality was restored, headed by Prince Aleksandras Olelka from the Gediminid clan. During the reign of Prince Olelko (1440–1455) and Semen Olelkovich (1455–1470), the principality enjoyed relative independence. Kiev experienced an economic and cultural boom, becoming a major centre for the development of crafts and trade. During this period (1470), the stone architecture of the Kievan Rus' era was rebuilt and restored, in particular Saint Sophia Cathedral and the Dormition Cathedral.

After the Council of Ferrara-Florence (1438–1445), which was convened to conclude a union between the Western and Eastern Christian churches, Metropolitan Isidore was in Kiev, already holding the titles of papal legate and cardinal. The Prince of Kiev, Oleklo, welcomed the Union of Florence, and the Metropolitan solemnly proclaimed the union in Kiev. However, although he did not encounter strong resistance, the Orthodox continued to avoid Catholic churches.

In 1458, after the schism of the Metropolis of Moscow and all Rus' from the mother church, the Ecumenical Patriarchate of Constantinople, the Muscovite hierarchs lost the right to bear the title "Metropolitan of Kiev". Kiev became the nominal centre of the Metropolis of Kiev, Galicia and all Rus' (1441–1596), although the metropolitans often continued to reside in Navahrudak, the former seat of the Metropolis of Lithuania. Metropolitans held the title Metropolis of Kiev, Galicia and all Rus', and the first metropolitan with this title was Gregory the Bulgarian.

After the death of Prince Semen Olelkovich in 1471, Grand Duke of Lithuania and King of Poland Casimir IV Jagiellon abolished the Principality of Kiev, transforming it into the Kiev Voivodeship. In 1471, the people of Kiev protested against the abolition of the principality and tried to prevent Martynas Goštautas, the first Voivode of Kiev, from entering the city. A permanent Lithuanian garrison was stationed in the castle. In 1481, princes led by Mikhailo Olelkovich conspired to kill Grand Duke of Lithuania Casimir IV and restore the appanage principalities, primarily Kiev. The conspiracy was exposed, and Prince Mikhailo was beheaded in Kiev.

In 1482, Kiev was sacked by Crimean Tatar troops under the command of Crimean Khan Meñli I Giray at the request of the Grand Prince of Moscow, Ivan III. Most of the old Kievan churches were destroyed. Saint Sophia Cathedral was looted. The Crimean khan presented the Muscovite prince with a golden diskos and chalice, which the Tatars took from the cathedral. Ivan III provoked the Crimean khan to further attacks, which took place in the late 15th and early 16th centuries and greatly slowed down the development of Kiev.

In c. 1494~1497, Grand Duke of Lithuania Alexander Jagiellon granted the city of Kiev the right to self-government (Magdeburg rights).

=== 16th century ===
At the beginning of the 16th century, Kiev was at the centre of the Muscovite–Lithuanian Wars. The growing threat from the Ottoman Empire in the first half of the 16th century led to intensive construction work to fortify Kyiv Castle. In 1508, the Glinski rebellion happened. In June 1508, the opportunistic nobleman Michael Glinski from Turov, who had defected to Muscovy, called on the Kievan boyars to revive the Principality of Kiev under the suzerainty of Vasili III. But he was defeated in the Battle of Orsha (1508) by grand hetman Konstanty Ostrogski of Lithuania.

In 1569, on the basis of the Union of Lublin, Kiev and the Kiev Voivodeship were transferred from the Grand Duchy of Lithuania to the Crown of the Kingdom of Poland.

From 1559 to 1608, Konstanty Wasyl Ostrogski, one of the wealthiest and most influential magnates of the Grand Duchy of Lithuania in the Polish-Lithuanian Commonwealth, was the voivode of Kyiv. He had great authority among the Orthodox Christians and in the 1560s advocated for the equal incorporation of Ruthenia into the Commonwealth. The prince founded the Ostrog Academy. However, he was unfavourable towards Kiev and ignored the Sejm's orders to fortify the Kyiv Castle. This was probably due to the independence of the Kievan townspeople, who enjoyed Magdeburg rights.

In 1571–1572, a plague epidemic raged in Kiev.

In 1593, during the Kosiński uprising, Kiev was briefly captured by the Zaporizhian Cossack rebels of Krzysztof Kosiński, but the forces of Ostrogski soon retook the city.

In 1595/6, with the Union of Brest, the Orthodox Metropolis of Kiev, Galicia and all Rus' entered into union with the Roman Catholic Church during the time of Metropolitan Michael Rohoza. This established the Ruthenian Uniate Church, and in it, the new Metropolis of Kiev, Galicia and all Ruthenia, which would last until the Partitions at the end of the 18th century.

In 1596, Kiev was again briefly captured by Cossack rebels during the Nalyvaiko Uprising.

=== 17th century ===
In 1615, Orthodox citizens of Kiev founded the Kyiv Epiphany Brotherhood, which opened the Brotherhood Monastery and the Brotherhood School.

In 1620, a new Orthodox Metropolis of Kiev, Galicia and all Rus' (1620–1686) was created. The Brotherhood received from the Patriarch of Constantinople the status of a self-governing unit (stauropegion), independent of the Metropolitan of Kiev.

In 1632, the Orthodox Kyiv-Mohyla Academy was founded, modelled on Jesuit educational institutions.

The townspeople of Kiev were involved in the Cossack wars led by Taras Triasylo in 1630 and Pavlo But in 1637–1638.

In 1649, Kiev was captured by Cossack troops during the Khmelnytsky Uprising. Bohdan Khmelnytsky made a triumphant entry into the city to the cheers of the Kyiv residents and Orthodox clergy. Kyiv became the centre of the Cossack Kyiv Regiment and Hundred. In May 1649, the Cossacks carried out a brutal three-day pogrom of the nobility, Catholic clergy, monasteries and churches. The pogrom was provoked by a townsman named Polegenkyi from Khmelnytsky's entourage.

On 4 August 1651, Kyiv was captured by the troops of Lithuanian Hetman Janusz Radziwiłł (1612–1655), who burned down Podil (the Lower City). The Lithuanian troops withdrew from Kyiv after a one-month occupation due to an outbreak of plague, which caused heavy losses. However, the city returned under the Polish–Lithuanian control as a result of Bila Tserkva Treaty.

On 4 June 1652, one of the Cossacks who was sympathetic to Adam Kysil secretly informed the voivode about the defeat of the crown army at Batih, advising him to leave Kyiv quickly, which he did immediately that night. The nobles, who learned of this, hastily left the city. Those who did not manage to leave by noon were not allowed to leave the city. Kyiv was returned to the Cossacks.

== Historical topography and administrative structure ==
=== Jurisdictions ===
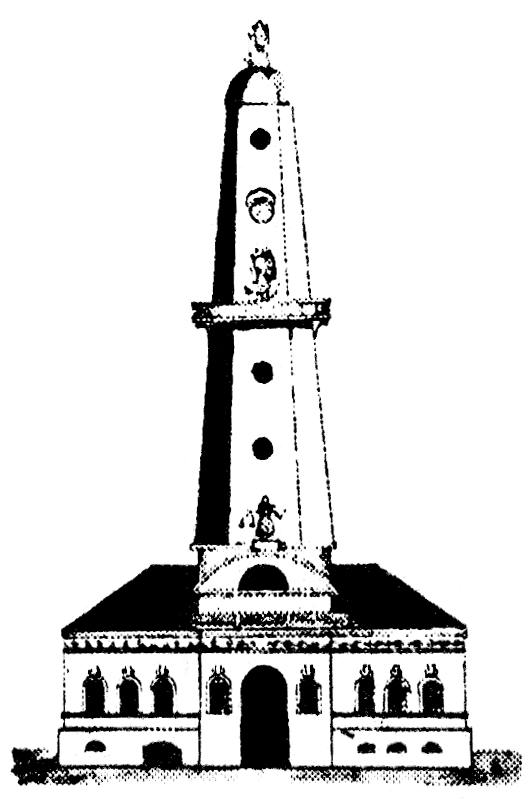
Image of the façade of the old Kyiv City Council building in Podil in 1697. The Ukrainian word for it, ратуша ratusha, came via Polish ratusz from Low German rathuus ("council house").

In the 16th century and the first half of the 17th century, Kiev had the usual elements of development and planning structure typical of Magdeburg cities: a castle, the city itself with a town hall in the centre, and suburbs. Despite this, a unique spatial division developed here, distinct from other cities. During this period, Kiev was a complex urban agglomeration. Its main component was the city of Magdeburg rights, which was located in Podil. Along with it, the agglomeration consisted of separate territories, which are defined as jurisdictions (Ukrainian: юридики, romanized: jurydyky): the castle territory jurisdiction of the Kievan voivode and his government, numerous church lands: the Bishopric — the lands of the Catholic bishop (eparch) of Kiev, the lands of St. Cyril's Monastery, Kyiv-Pechersk Lavra, St. Sophia Cathedral, St. Michael's Golden-Domed Monastery, Vydubychi Monastery, Pustynno-Mykilsky, and Catholic St. Nicholas Dominican Monastery. The Armenian community also had a separate territory with a different jurisdiction. Tense relations developed between the city community and the voivode and lawyers, which manifested themselves in numerous court disputes. The struggle with private lawyers — the common nobility and urban real estate — which was traditional for the Grand Duchy of Lithuania and the Polish–Lithuanian Commonwealth, also continued.

Olena Popelnytska notes the likelihood of the existence of a traditional medieval division into parishes in Kiev during this period, as recorded in documents from the second half of the 17th century. The «Опис київського замку» (Description of the Kyiv Castle) of 1552 and the «Податковий тариф» (Tax Tariff) of 1570 mention the 'priestly' houses of the Prechistenska (Uspinska), Dobro-Nikolska, Pritisk-Nikolska, Demydivska, Voskresenska, Naberezhno-Mykilska, Spaska, Borysoglibska, Bilitska, Rozhdestvenska, and Afanasiivska parishes. From 1611 onwards, the Demydivska, Bilitska and Afanasiivska parishes are not mentioned in the sources. In 1632, new parish churches are mentioned: Vasylivska, Illinska and Sviatodukhivska. Until the middle of the 17th century, some Orthodox churches and monasteries were located within the 'castle' jurisdiction: Dobro- and Prytysko-Mykilska, Vasylivska and Rozhdestvenska (and probably Voskresenska) churches and the Florivsky Monastery.

According to the description by Guillaume Le Vasseur de Beauplan around 1640, the Orthodox Christians of Kiev had up to 10 churches, one of which, the Brotherhood Church, was located near the town hall. Catholics had four churches in the city: the cathedral, the Dominican church (in the market square), the Bernardine church (under the hill), and the Jesuit church ('recently built').

=== Podil (Lower City) ===
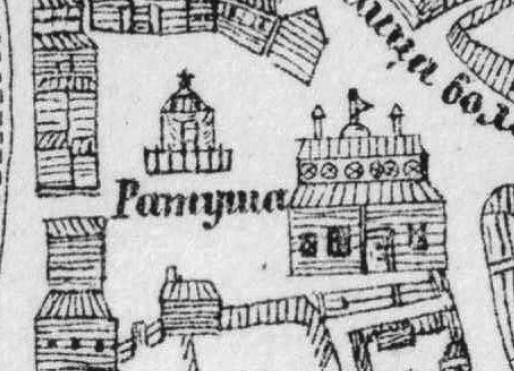
Ivan Ushakov. City Hall on a fragment in the 1695 book «Креслення міста Києва…» ("Drawings of the city of Kyiv")

During the Lithuanian-Polish period, Podil occupied a central place in the urban life of Kiev. Most of the city's population lived here. The city hall (Ратуша Ratusha), the main market, the city cathedral, the harbour, numerous merchant warehouses, and trading colonies from other cities and lands were located here. During this period, Kiev did not have a regularly planned rectangular modular street structure typical of cities with a Magdeburg plan. After the devastation and destruction wrought by the Mongol hordes, Kiev was rebuilt on the basis of the irregular layout established in Kievan Rus' times. This irregular development remained until the great fire of 1811. As in most cities of that time, the main streets connected the Market Square, the entrance gates, and churches. The city centre — the Market Square — was located between the Pyrohoshcha Church and the Brotherhood Monastery. The two-storey wooden Kyiv City Hall building stood on the central Market Square. The interior of the building apparently had two chambers — the ‘courtroom’ or ‘court house,’ which was the main part and where council and bench meetings were held, and the ‘parlour.’ The area around the Market Square was considered a prestigious place to live. The city's elite lived here. The residential buildings were wooden, mostly one-storey. The main unit of development was a courtyard consisting of 1-3 residential and various farm buildings, the number of which depended on the wealth of the owners.

The main cathedral church of Kiev during the Lithuanian-Polish period was the Church of the Assumption of the Mother of God, better known as the Pyrohoshcha Church. It was built in 1135 and reconstructed at the expense of the townspeople in the 15th century, as well as in 1613, when Italian architect Sebastiano Brachi gave it a Renaissance style. The cathedral housed the city archives, trade weights and measures, and was the burial place of the patriciate of Kiev. The temple had a city hospital and a school. In 1632, there were also 11 churches in Podil, 8 of which were located on the territory subordinate to the magistrate. The total area of Podil had significantly decreased compared to the Kievan Rus' period. From the northwest, the city border ran along the bed of the Hlybochytsia River, slightly north of the modern streets of Verkhniy Val (Upper Wall) and Nizhniy Val (Lower Wall) Street. There were fortifications in the form of a wooden palisade. There were no fortifications on the Dnipro side. Several roads led to the Lower City through the entrance gates: from the Upper City via two descents, from the Pechersk town via the Khreshchatyk Gate, from the Kozhumyaki and Kudryavets tracts via the Kozhumyatska Gate, from the Biskupsk town, the Kyrylivsky Monastery through the Biskupsky Gate, and from the Mezhyhirya Monastery through the Voskresensky or Bydlohinny Gate.

=== Kyiv Castle and Castle Hill ===
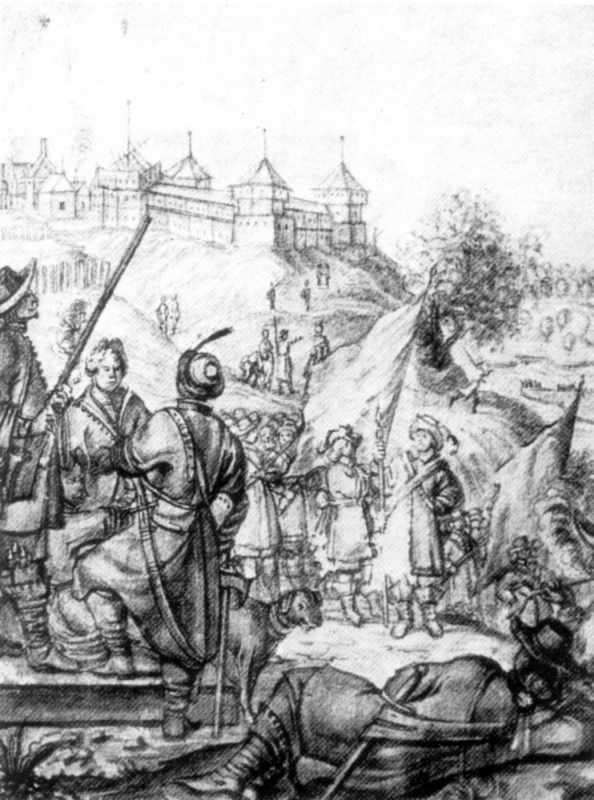
Kyiv Castle in a drawing by Abraham van Westerveld (1651)

After Kyiv's final annexation to the Grand Duchy of Lithuania, Volodymyr Olgerdovych began construction of Kyiv Castle on a hill, which later became known as Zamkova Hora (Castle Hill). It housed the princely residence. After the liquidation of the Kievan Principality, the castle was to serve as a visible confirmation of the presence of central state power. The castle was supposed to be home to the Kievan voivodes or their governors. In case of military threat, the city's population would hide there. The Kyiv Castle was a powerful military fortress that played a big role because of its border location and in the internal political struggles in the Grand Duchy of Lithuania.

In the middle of the 16th century, Kyiv Castle consisted of connected wooden log structures 4 sazhens (approx. 8 m) long and up to 3–4 m high. Some of the log structures were filled with earth, while others were left empty and used to house various service rooms and warehouses, as well as living quarters for the fortress garrison. Also, in 1552, royal auditors recorded 16 buildings in the castle. The Kyiv Castle housed a mint, a bathhouse, a kitchen, and a brewery; there were three Orthodox and one Catholic churches. In the event of an enemy attack, the population of the city and surrounding villages could take refuge here. The fortress had 15 three-tiered towers, one of which was quadrangular and the rest hexagonal, on which cannons were placed. The castle could be accessed through two gates, the Voivodska and the Drabska (Arabic), as well as through a small wicket gate. The main gate was Voivodska, located on the north side of the hill above the building of the modern Zhitny Market. A large clock was located on the Voivodska gate tower. The Drab Gate was located on the southern side of the hill and led to the area of the modern Andriivskyi Uzviz. In front of it was a moat, across which a drawbridge on two chains was thrown.

The jurisdiction of the voivode and the castle government covered part of the lower town adjacent to Castle Hill, as well as the lands near the Kudryavets River, the Skolniki tract, and 11 villages around Kiev.

=== Diocesan and Dominican Monastery ===
In Podil, in the area of modern Prytysko-Mykilska Street, there was the Dominican Monastery with the Church of St. Nicholas. The monastery is documented in pre-Mongol times. It was destroyed several times. Built in the 1600s to replace a wooden church, it was converted into the Orthodox St. Peter and Paul Church in 1691 and destroyed by the Bolsheviks in the 1930s. The monastery owned the Khlopach tract and 10 mills on the Lower Syrka. In the first half of the 17th century, the Bernardine Monastery and the residence of the Jesuits were founded under Andriivska Hill.

In 1602, by order of Sigismund III Vasa, the ‘Bishop's Town’ was established, removing part of the territory with its population from the jurisdiction of the magistrate and the castle and transferring it to the Catholic (Latin) Bishop of Kiev. The town community was headed by a mayor. The community elected four candidates for the position of mayor, one of whom was then approved by the bishop. The territory of the Bishopric extended to the tracts of Hlybochytske, Kozhumyaki, part of Honchariv, Mount Shchekavytsia, part of the Lukyanivskyi Plateau with Kudriavets, as well as the territory ‘behind Kanava’ to the Syrets river, beyond which lay the lands of St. Cyril's Monastery. In 1604, the Latin bishop took away the metropolitan's country house with a garden from the Orthodox clergy and built a castle there. Not far from the modern Rye Market stood a Catholic cathedral.

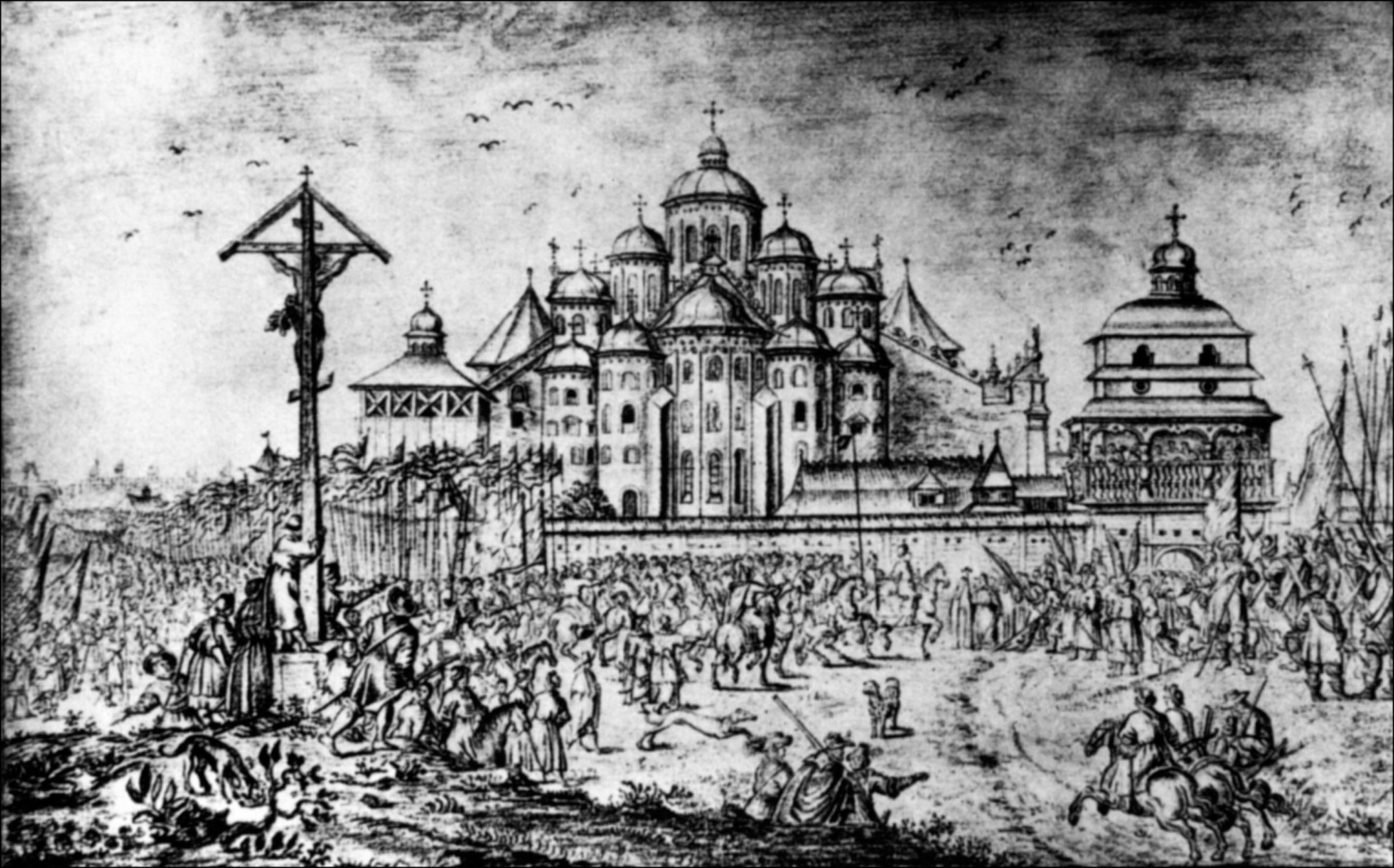
Saint Sophia Cathedral in 1651. Drawing by Abraham van Westerveld.

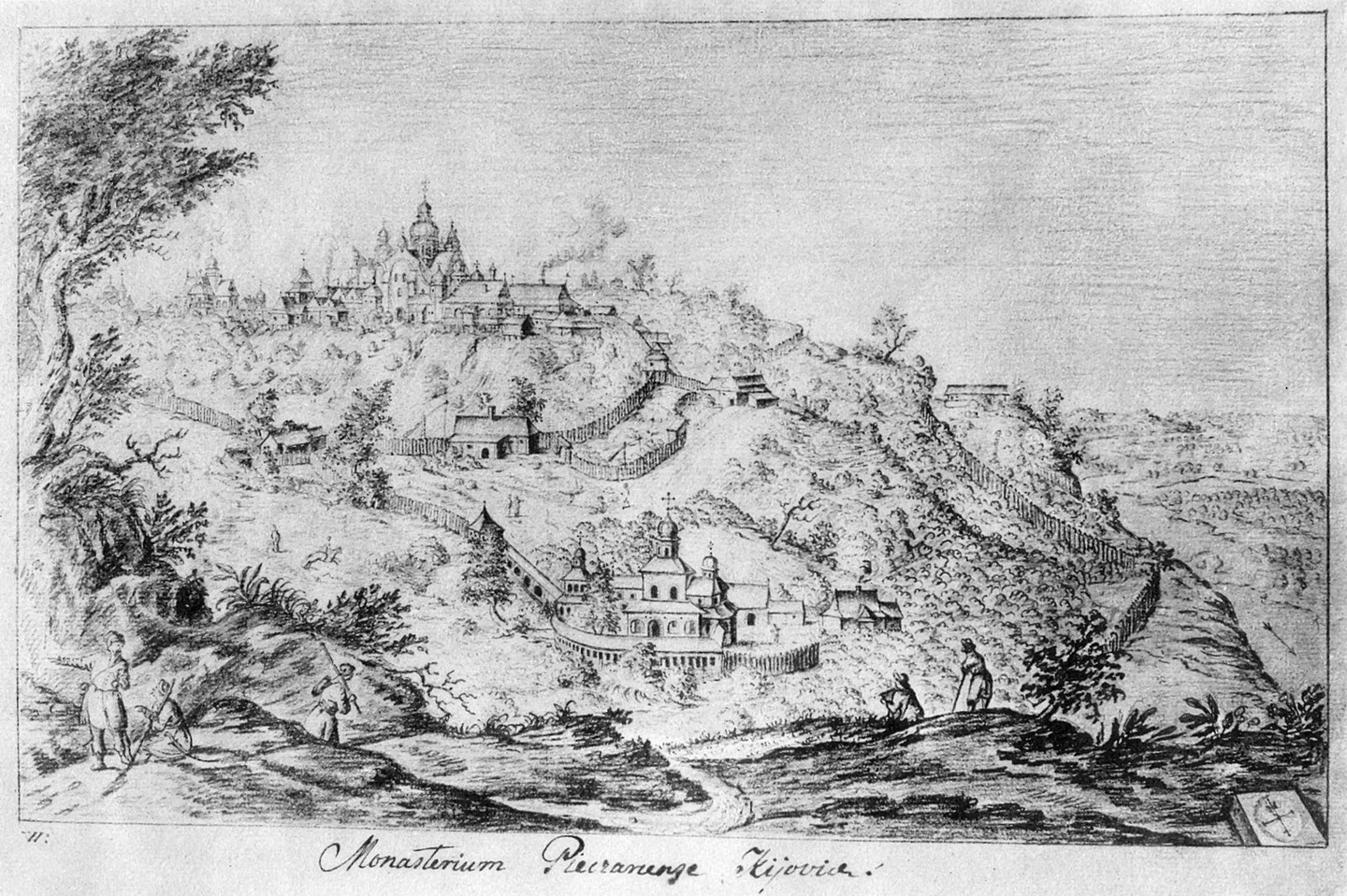
Kyiv Pechersk Lavra in the 1650s in a drawing by Abraham van Westerveld.

=== Sophia Monastery ===
The Sophia Monastery owned a considerable area in Old Kyiv (the Upper City). In 1586, with the permission of Prince Konstanty Ostrogski, a settlement was founded near the monastery. The settlement was headed by a mayor. After the monastery was transferred to the Uniate Metropolitan as a result of the Union of Brest (1596), legal disputes over the right to control the settlement continued between him and the castle government in 1612—1619. In 1633, the St. Sophia Monastery came under the jurisdiction of the Orthodox Metropolitan. By privilege of 8 November 1639, King Władysław IV Vasa, at the request of Metropolitan Petro Mohyla, granted the privilege of establishing a town near the monastery with Magdeburg rights and the right of propination, building a castle, and introducing two annual fairs on St. Sophia's Day and Ascension Day. However, this plan was never realised.

=== Other Orthodox monasteries ===
St. Michael's Golden-Domed Monastery, located in the Upper City since 1560 owned Obrubny Island with Petrykov and Plosky lakes on the Dnieper, land on the right bank at the mouth of the Lybid' river, as well as the villages of Lisivtsi and Tovstolisya. In 1609-1630, the monastery belonged to the jurisdiction of the Uniate Metropolitan. The lands of St. Cyril's Monastery lay across the Syrets River. The Kyiv Pechersk Lavra had the status of a separate town, which had the right to self-government and independence from the voivode. The monastery also owned several villages outside the city. The Vydubychi Monastery and Pustynno-Mykilsky monastery were also landowners.

== Self-government and Magdeburg rights ==
Presumably, the municipal authorities in Kiev at that time were a product of the historical development of the Kievan community since the days of Kievan Rus'. The official granting of Magdeburg rights to the city by the Lithuanian authorities merely legalised the historical customary law. As everywhere else in medieval Europe, the legal basis for the development of Kiev and the expansion of the rights of the urban community was formed by privileges granted to the city by the Grand Dukes of Lithuania in 1494, 1498, 1502, 1514, 1516 and subsequent years. At the end of the 1480s, Kiev had a mayor's office, which had the following functions and powers: supervising order in the city and ensuring its fire safety.

The privilege of 1494 granted by Alexander Jagiellon in the absence of separate city jurisdiction — the mayor had limited administrative functions and no judicial power — regulated the rights and obligations of the city's residents.

The privilege of 1498 granted the residents of Kiev Magdeburg rights. A separate city jurisdiction was formed in Kiev. The population of the city gradually transitioned from the authority and judicial jurisdiction of the voivode to the new city authorities headed by the mayor. Residents living within the city's jurisdiction had to pay city taxes.

The privilege granted by Sigismund II Augustus on 28 May 1570 had a significant impact on the development of the urban community, greatly expanding the rights of the Kievan community in the election of the mayor.

Criminal proceedings in the city were the responsibility of the voivode, who headed the judicial council, the lava. The mayor had a deputy — the leontviat, or podviat — usually chosen from among the senior members of the bench. The privilege of 28 May 1570 gave the Kievan community the right to elect four candidates for mayor, one of whom would then be approved by the king. This right spread to Ukrainian cities after the conclusion of the Lublin Union in 1569 and the introduction of Polish-style administrative procedures in Ukrainian territories. The bench consisted of five bench members (at the end of the 16th century and the first half of the 17th century). Usually, workshop masters under Magdeburg jurisdiction were elected to the bench for a term of one year.

The highest body of municipal self-government was the council, headed by the mayor. The council managed municipal property and represented the city in foreign relations. It conducted civil proceedings in cases concerning inheritance, property, taxes, city improvement, etc. In the last third of the 16th century and the first half of the 17th century, Kiev had a typical model of city government based on Magdeburg law. Every year, the community elected a city government — the ‘New Council,’ which consisted of four ruling councillors who took turns performing the functions of mayor. After the end of their term in office, councillors were considered members of the ‘Old Council,’ retained some powers, and participated in meetings of the New Council. The magistrate assigned certain councillors the functions of treasurers — persons responsible for the city treasury. Tax collectors were selected from among the councillors and aldermen.

From the end of the 16th century, joint meetings of two collegiums — the council and the bench — were common. If necessary, the entire current and previous governments gathered, together with representatives of the city community.

Various Latin and Polish legal compilations were used in the judicial practice of Kiev. In particular, the works of the Polish lawyer Bartłomiej Groicki: ‘Articles of Magdeburg rights, known as the Saxon Mirror, translated from Latin into Polish’ (Kraków, 1558), based on translations from German legislative collections, ‘The Order of City Courts in the Polish Crown’ (Kraków, 1559), ‘The Order of Courts on the Death Penalty,’ based on the German criminal code of Charles V of 1532. The usual punishment in Kiev was fines and imprisonment in the city jail. Unlike in the crown cities, torture and the death penalty were rarely used. Betrayal of the city oath was punished with ‘infamy’, which entailed deprivation of city citizenship and expulsion from the city.

=== City seal and coat of arms ===
The oldest colour image of the coat of arms of Kyiv is found in the armorial of Conrad Grünenberg from 1480.

With the emergence of the self-governing body — the City Council — it received a seal for certifying documents. In the Middle Ages, legal force was given to documents by a ‘seal’ bearing the image of the city's coat of arms, which was certified by the relevant government official.

Researcher of Kyiv seals Kostiatyn Antipovych (1899–1949) identified several types of such seals, the first of which dates back to 1500. The city's coat of arms on it was a rounded shield with a bow and arrow (or two arrows), which were being pulled back by two hands reaching out of a cloud.

On the seal from 1630, the cloud is no longer present in the coat of arms, and the bow has been transformed into a crossbow held vertically by one hand. This transformed symbol appears on all other city seals of Kiev until 1780.

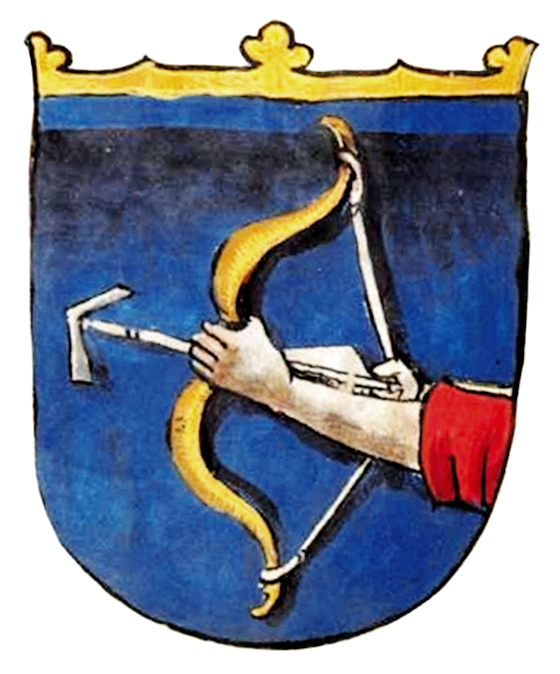
The coat of arms of Kyiv in Conrad Grünenberg's armorial (1480)

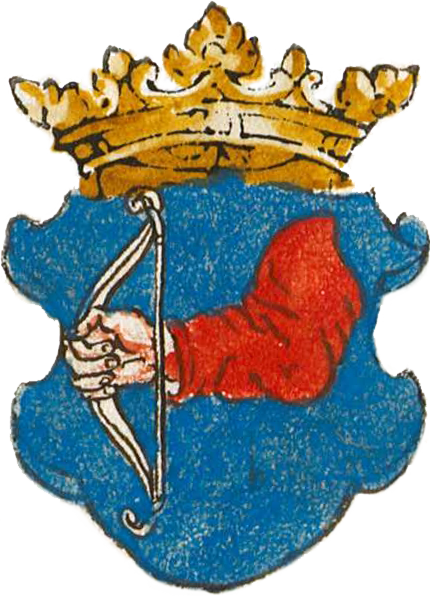
The coat of arms of Kyiv in a German armorial from the first half of the 16th century

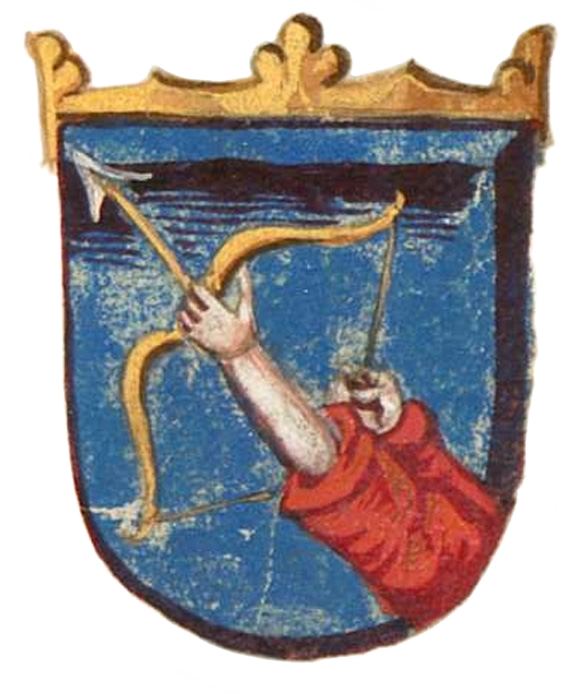
The coat of arms of Kyiv in the Georg Ortenburg manuscript (Cgm 9210; dated 1602—1604) of Grünenberg's armorial

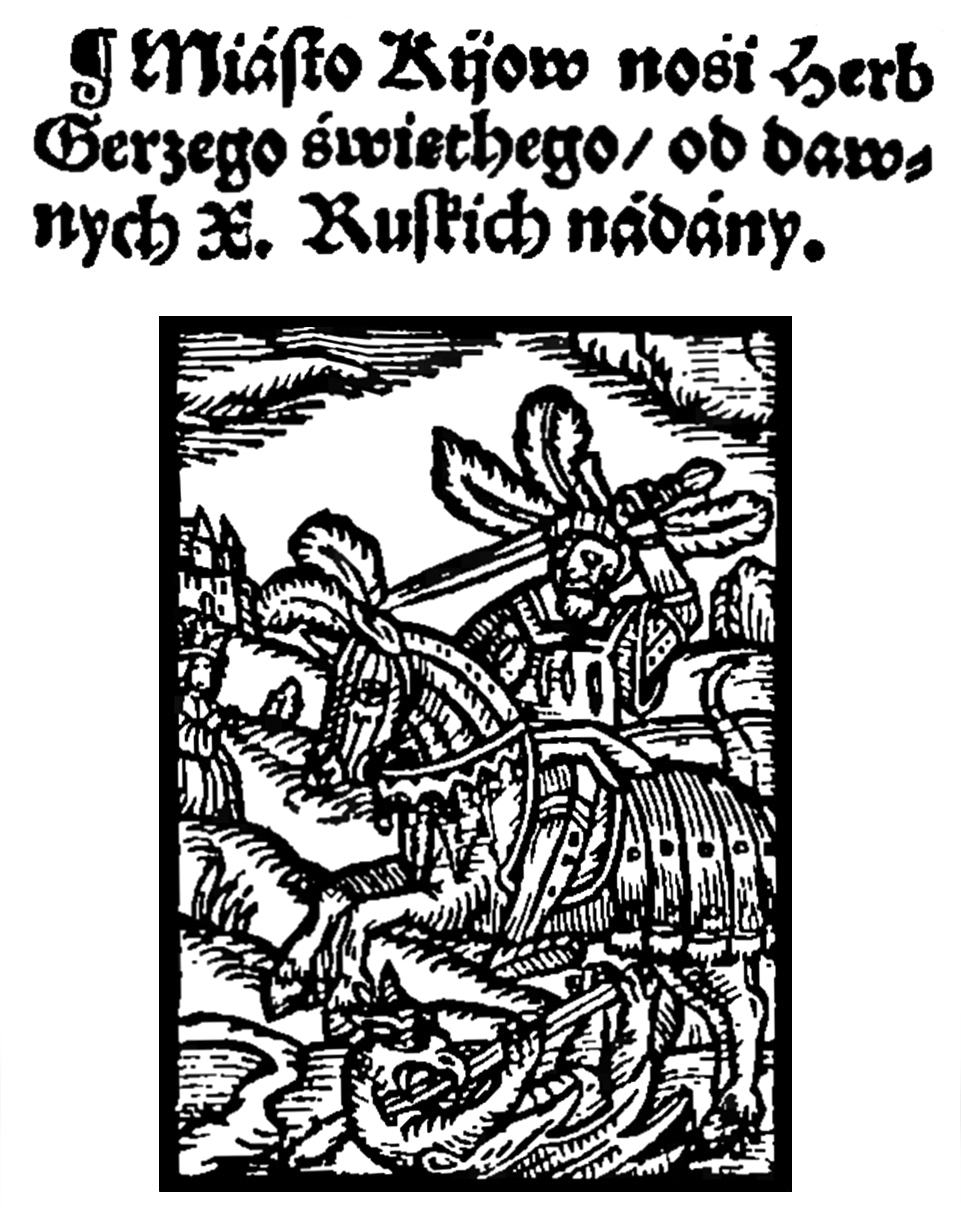
Coat of arms of Kyiv with Saint George the Dragonslayer (1578)

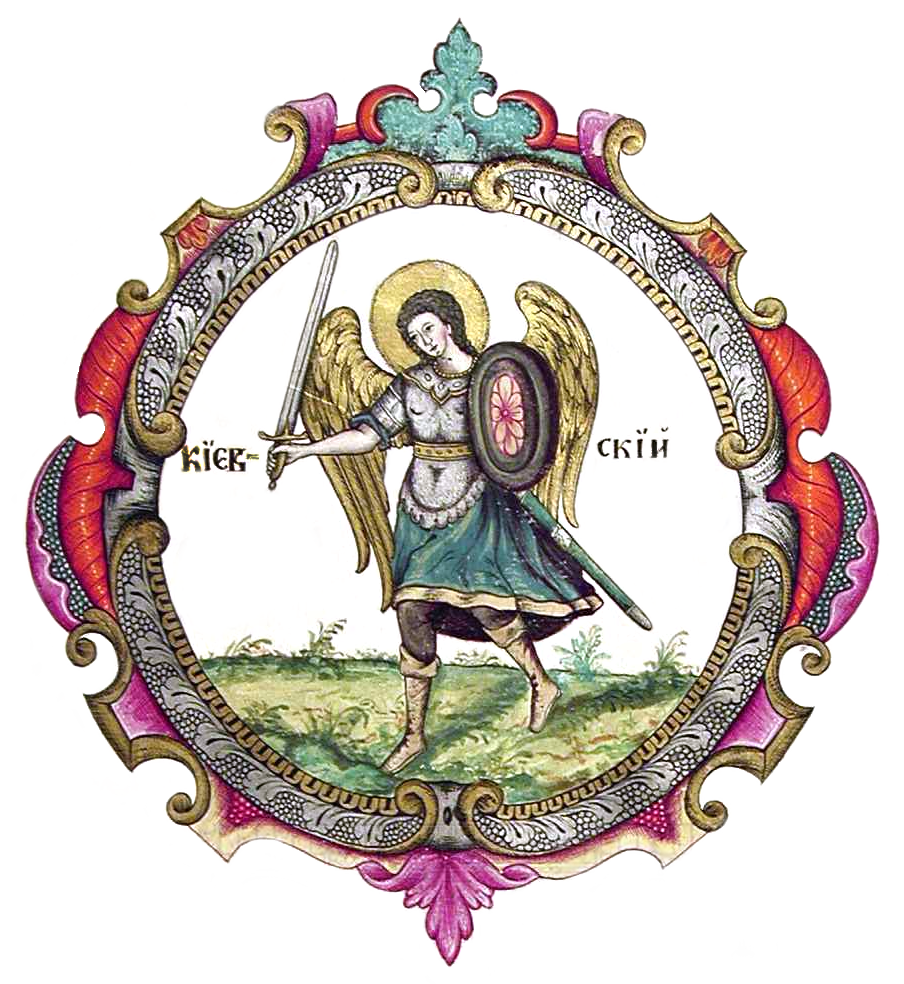
Kyiv Land coat of arms (1672)

Kyiv city magistrate coat of arms (1698, on the seal)

== Population ==
=== Census data and estimates ===
Year	Population
1552	4,500
1571	6,000~6,500
1622	11,000
late 1640s	c. 12,000~13,000

According to the 1552 census, there were 450 households of various jurisdictions in Podil, and the total population of Kiev was about 4,500. (Note: "It can be assumed that about three thousand Kyivan residents lived in Podil at that time. If we add to this the population of the Pechersk town and the Upper Suburb, the total number of inhabitants of Kyiv in the middle of the 17th century would be approximately 4,500.") In 1571, the number of inhabitants appears to have grown to 6,000–6,500. (Note: "In 1571, the number of households in Podil was estimated at approximately 655; in Pechersk and the Upper City, there were almost 300. Thus, the population of Kyiv at the beginning of 1571 could have been around 6,000–6,500.") The plague epidemic of 1571/2 would have significantly decreased the population again. According to data from the 1622 census of the Kievan region, there were 1,750 households in the city (including all settlements under various jurisdictions), which could have amounted to 11,000 inhabitants. For comparison: the largest cities in the Polish-Lithuanian Commonwealth in the 17th century were: Gdańsk (70,000), Warsaw (30,000), Kraków (28,000) and Poznań (20,000), while cities such as Toruń, Elbląg, and Lublin had approximately 10,000 inhabitants each. Meanwhile, Lviv (Lwów), at the time the largest city in the Ukrainian lands, was home to at least 22,000–23,000 people in the second half of the 17th century. This made Kiev an 'average' city in the Commonwealth of the 1630s and 1640s.

According to census data, the majority of the population of Kiev from the 14th century to the mid-17th century was local Ukrainian: almost all names and surnames were typically Ukrainian. Ukrainian was the spoken language in the city. Many Belarusians lived in Kiev. Poles made up part of the population, and their numbers began to grow in the second half of the 16th century. In the area of the present-day Lvivska Square, the Jewish population began to grow in the second quarter of the 17th century.

=== Armenians ===
The Armenian community had a separate territory around the Church of the Nativity of the Virgin Mary, which stood on Khreshchatyk Street, leading from the gate of the same name in the south to Market Square. Now, on the site of this temple, stands the Holy Intercession Church of Podil, built in the late 17th-18th centuries. In 1622, eight Armenian families lived in Podil, including nobleman Fedir Khalepsky (Soltanovich) and burgher and magistrate official Vasyl Kurcevych. Armenians were mainly involved in eastern trade, and the government willingly appointed Armenians as ‘interpreters’ — police officials who were translators and also secretly monitored foreigners arriving in Kiev.The community had the right to own fields and a mill on the Syrets River, two taverns, and courtyards near its own church. The Armenians of Kiev were subject to two jurisdictions. After the adoption of the union, the community was subordinated to the council of Armenian elders in Lviv. In 1633, King Władysław IV Vasa transferred the property of the church to the Kievan magistrate.

=== Cossacks ===
The Ukrainian Cossacks were an important factor in Kievan society. Cossack courtyards were located under the jurisdiction of the castle and the magistrate. At the end of the 15th and 16th centuries, the Cossacks coexisted peacefully in Kiev. Cossacks who were engaged in predatory activities (beekeeping, hunting, fishing) settled in the courtyards of Kievan residents. Kievan Cossacks are also mentioned as ‘steppe pirates’ who robbed merchant caravans. The Cossacks played an important role in the colonisation of the southern lands of the country and in the confrontation with nomads. At the end of the 16th century, the impoverished inhabitants of the city became a source of replenishment for the Registered Cossacks and Zaporizhzhian Cossacks.

From the end of the 16th century, relations between the Kievan community and the Cossacks became complicated. Kiev found itself in the midst of the uprising of the Zaporizhzhian Cossacks led by Krystof Kosynsky in 1593. In response to the arrests and brutal torture of Cossack envoys by castle officials, the rebels laid siege to Kiev. The local nobility, who were gathered in Kiev at the time for court proceedings, sent a delegation to negotiate with the Cossacks. However, the Cossacks marched on Kiev with their entire army, and as a result of negotiations, the Cossacks received monetary compensation and left the city peacefully. Relations between the Kievan community and the Cossacks during the 1593 uprising were tense. Unlike other cities on the Dnieper, the Kievan elite was more loyal to the official authorities. In 1596, Kiev found itself in the midst of the uprising led by Severin Nalyvaiko. After the defeat of the uprising, the confiscation of Cossack property in Kiev continued for several years, including the confiscation of 11 Cossack houses. Starting in the second decade of the 17th century, conflicts arose between the city community and the Cossacks due to the Cossacks' almost annual stays in the city. After the Polish-Muscovite War of 1617–1618, Kiev was constantly under the influence of the Cossacks.

== Economy ==
The Mongol invasion of the mid-13th century interrupted the economic development of Kiev. The city's craft industry suffered the most damage. Many craftsmen died or fled to the Principality of Galicia-Volhynia, and the skills that had been passed down from generation to generation were lost. New craftsmen came mainly from rural areas and peripheral towns. With the stabilisation of the political situation in the Kievan region after the annexation of these lands to the Grand Duchy of Lithuania, and mainly during the reign of the Kievan princes Olelko (1440— 1455) and Semen Olelkovich, Kiev regained its status as a centre of craftsmanship and local and international trade in the region. Volodymyr Olgerdovych established a mint in the castle, where he minted his own coins.

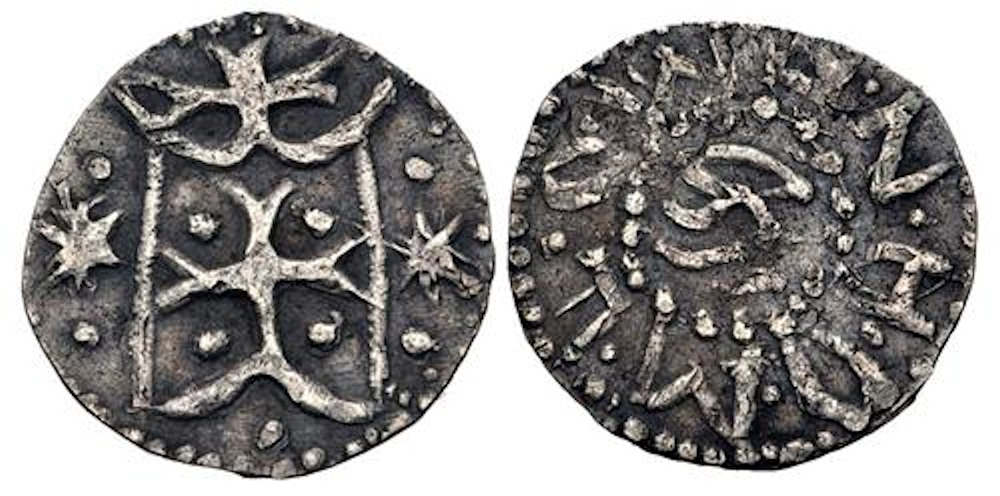
Photo of the obverse of a coin of Volodymyr Olherdovych, prince of Kiev 1362–1394.

Craftsmanship and trade were concentrated mainly in Podil. Kievan craftsmen were united in guild organisations. All guild activities were strictly regulated by statutes. Masters employed journeymen and apprentices. There were also non-guild, unorganised craftsmen in the city — ‘porters’. In the 15th century, there were the following craft specialisations in Kiev: carpenters, joiners, blacksmiths, archers and shooters, bootmakers, tailors, shoemakers, furriers, goldsmiths, winemakers, barbers, butchers, bakers, wheelwrights, coopers, and saddlers. Crafts were also widespread among the people of Kiev, in particular fishing — fishermen united in guilds, industrial hunting of fur animals, milling, etc. The townspeople also engaged in agricultural activities, many of them had orchards, vegetable gardens, and livestock. The hayfields needed for livestock were mainly located in Obolon (where Bydlohinna Street, or Voloska Street, led), in the meadows near it, on the left bank of the Dnieper.

Local trade was conducted by ‘middlemen’ who bought goods from craftsmen and food from peasants and sold them at the market, where they had their own stalls. The ‘middlemen’ were probably united in their own guild. The main products of craftsmanship were mostly everyday items. Food products included bread, meat, fish, poultry, eggs, cheese, fruit, and vegetables. Hay and straw, firewood, charcoal, construction timber, and other goods were also brought in from the villages.

Kiev's location at the crossroads of important trade routes connecting Western and Eastern Europe, the Balkans, and the Middle East, as well as its long tradition of participation in international trade, enabled it to regain its status as a major centre of international trade, which had been lost due to the Mongol invasion. Kiev was home to one of the main customs offices of the Grand Duchy of Lithuania, which was one of the leading places in terms of customs duties in the state. Given the presence of the Dnieper, Pripyat and Desna rivers, which converge in the Kievan area, Kiev became the main centre for gathering Eastern European merchants into caravans to travel to Crimea, the Ottoman Empire, the Balkans, and the Middle East. The market of Kiev was used to export Ukrainian beekeeping products — honey and wax — as well as furs to Moldavia, the Balkans, and Constantinople. Bread from the Middle Dnieper, Volhynia and Podolia regions was sold in Kiev, as well as fur products from the Crimean Khanate. Salt, which was brought from Kolomyia and the Black Sea estuaries, played an important role in Kiev's trade. Extensive trade relations were maintained with Moscow and Belarusian cities. Tatar and Turkish horses were sold at the market of Kiev. An important part of Kiev's transit trade was oriental goods — spices, wines, leather goods, Persian carpets, and various fabrics. Handicrafts were also exported from Kiev: hats, belts, knives, swords, locks, and items made by Kievan jewellers. Kievan bows and arrows were also highly valued.

By a privilege granted on 29 March 1514 by Sigismund I the Old, Kiev was granted the right to hold two annual fairs — Epiphany (6 January) and the Nativity of the Virgin Mary (8 September), and from 1592 on St. George's Day (23 April, instead of Epiphany). The right to sell honey, beer, wine, etc. was also granted. Under this privilege, the townspeople had to pay a national tax for military needs to the royal treasury. The privilege of 12 January 1516 subordinated the craft guilds to the city's jurisdiction. The privilege of Sigismund II on 8 March 1544 granted the Kievan city community vazhnitsa with the right to collect ‘weight’.

The privilege granted by Alexander Jagiellon on 4 June 1500 guaranteed the people of Kiev the right to trade duty-free within the state. The privilege of 1516 mentions the right of storage for Kievan residents, which obliged visiting merchants to sell their goods wholesale to local merchants within a specified period of time. Later, a guest house was built in Kiev for such trade (first mentioned in 1584). Road coercion obliged merchants to transport goods via warehouse cities. One of the most important rights, which brought the greatest profits, was the right to a monopoly on taverns throughout the city, including the castle and monasteries. For this right, the townspeople paid an annual tax to the royal treasury. On 3 July 1627, Kiev was granted the exclusive right to sell grain and food products to visiting merchants in the city.

== Culture ==
Khan Baty's invasion led to a decline in the quantity and quality of artworks created in Kiev. Most of the masters were lost. Experienced icon painters, miniaturists, book copyists, carvers, and others were killed, fled, or taken captive.

=== Book writing and printing ===
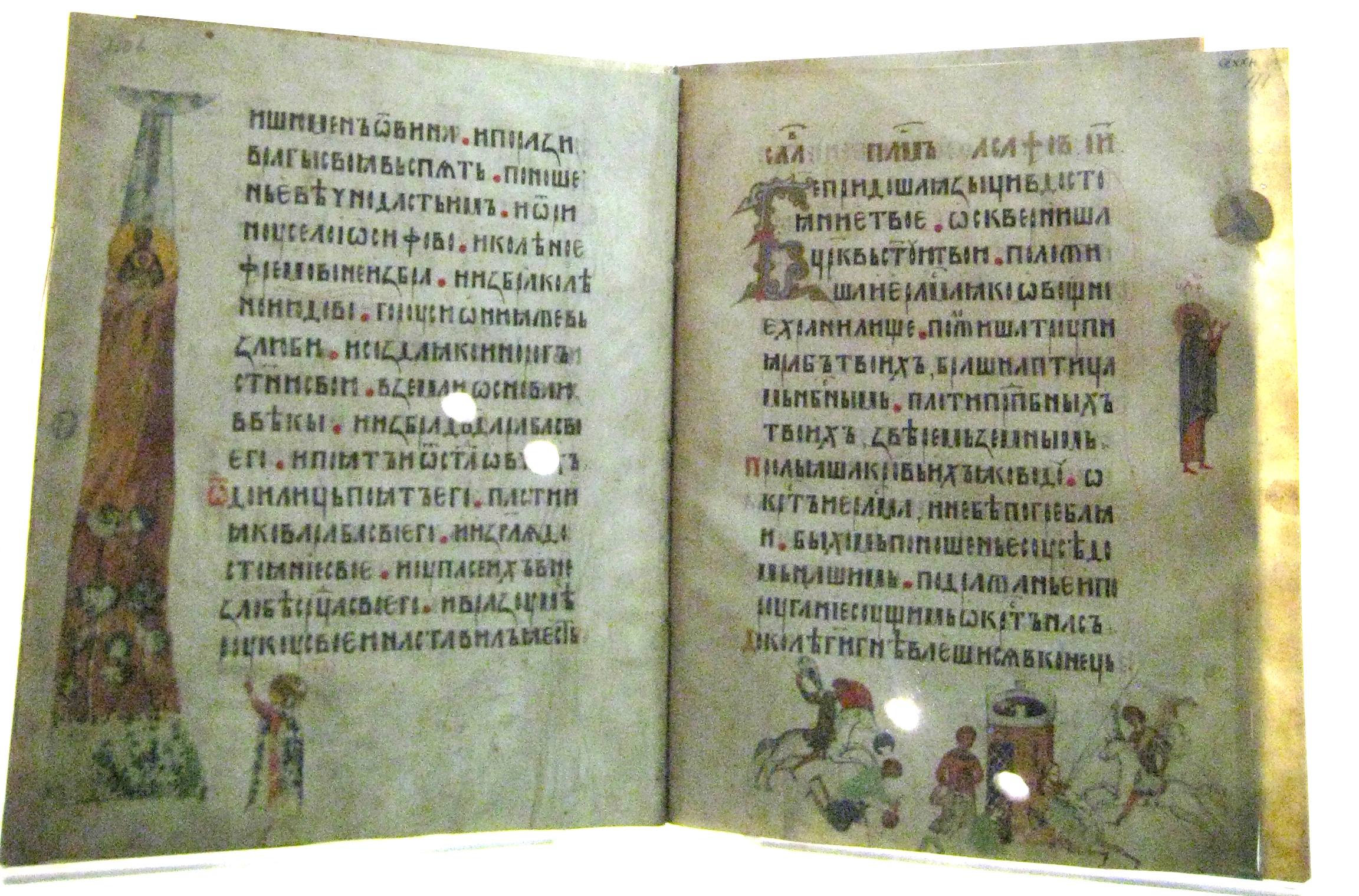
Kiev Psalter of 1397

During the Lithuanian-Polish period, book writing continued in Kiev, having been revived in the second half of the 13th century. Kievan books of the 14th century include the Aprakos Lavra Gospel, which features bright initials, headpieces, and titles, as well as the 14th-century Gospel, which has survived only in fragments. A notable monument of art from that period is the beautifully illustrated Kiev Psalter of 1397, written in a large-format parchment manuscript consisting of 229 sheets. At the end of the 14th century and in the first half of the 15th century, writers and organisers of book and chronicle publishing, Cyprian and Gregory Tsamblak, created various written works in Kiev: letters, ‘words’, messages, sermons, etc.

At the end of the 14th and beginning of the 15th centuries, two new editions of the Kyiv Caves Patericon appeared: the Arseniev and Feodosiev editions. In 1460–1462, Kasian, a monk of the Pechersky Monastery, created two more new editions of the Paterikon, based directly on the Oldest. In the 17th century, printed editions were created: in 1635 by Sylvester Kosov, Joseph Tryzna (1647–1656), the second printed edition in 1661, and others.

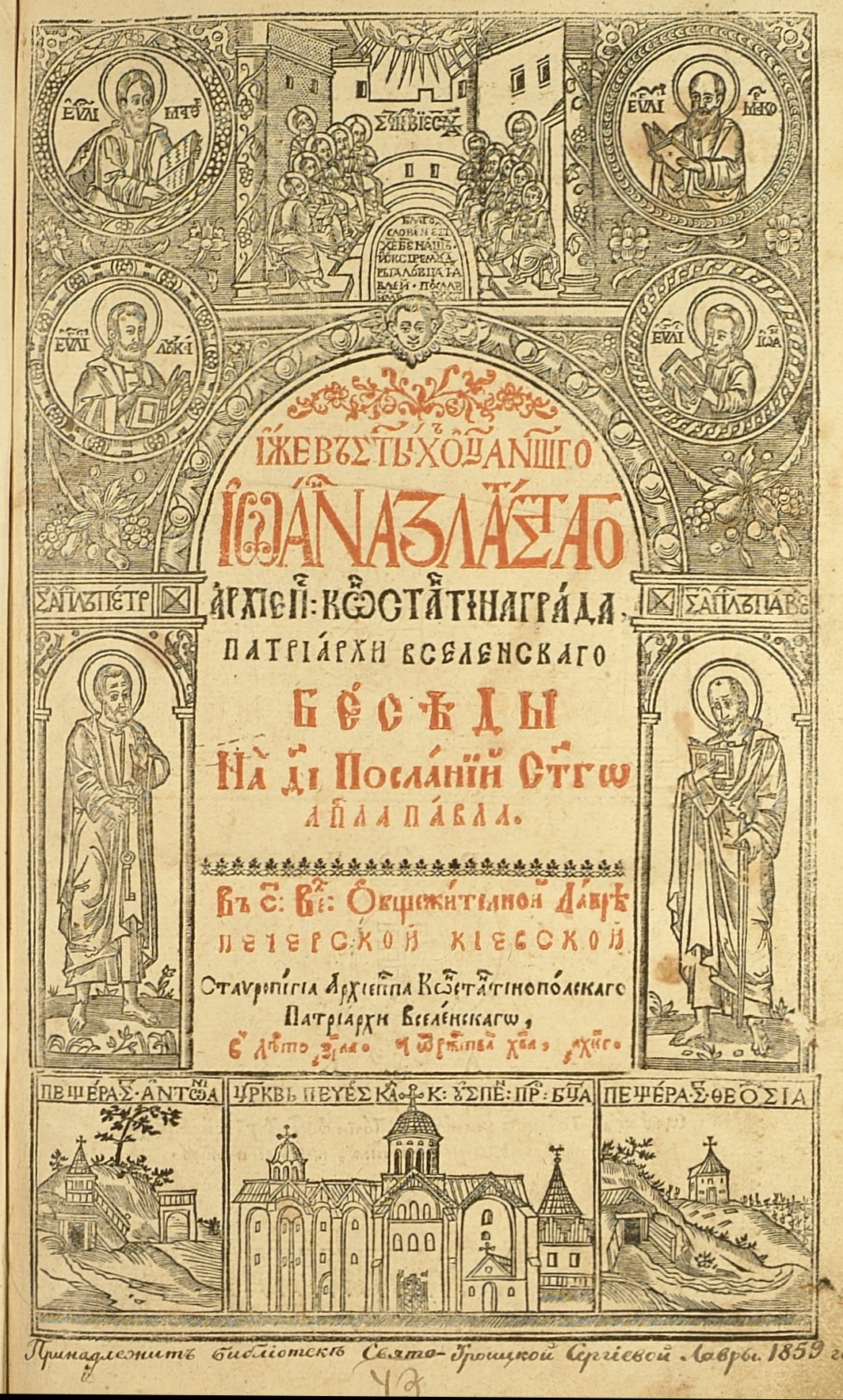
Тitle page from the book ‘Conversations of John Chrysostom.’ 1623.

At the beginning of the 15th century, another monument of book writing was created in the workshop of the Pustynno-Mykilsky Monastery — the Gospel. The Skitsky Paterik and the Ladder of Divine Ascent were also created in this monastery at the beginning of the 17th century. There are also well-known books copied in the Pechersky Monastery — the ‘Explanatory Gospel’ (1434), ‘The Ladder’ (1455), “Zlatostruy” (1474), and Kyiv Caves Patericon (1553). The Kormcha of the Kyiv-Sofia Cathedral, created in the Sophia Monastery in the second half of the 15th century, has been preserved.

In 1615, a printing house was established at the Pechersk Monastery. To meet the needs of the printing house, its founder, Archimandrite Yelisey Pletenetsky, organised paper production in Radomyshl. The printing house specialised in publishing ecclesiastical, theological, and secular literature, including educational and polemical works. In the course of the printing house's activities, a scientific and literary circle of scholars, writers, and printing experts formed around it. The printing house began its activities with the publication of the ‘Book of Hours’ in 1616. Several editions of the Service Book, Psalter, Nomocanon, Triodion, Akathist, and others were published in Kiev. The Kyiv Pechersk Lavra printing house published the theological works of John Chrysostom — ‘Discourses of John Chrysostom on the 14 Epistles of St. Paul the Apostle’ (1623) and ‘Discourses of John Chrysostom on the Acts of the Holy Apostles’ (1624). The ‘Teacher's Gospel’ (1637) — a collection of sermons for Sundays selected from the works of John Chrysostom — was very popular. The ‘Book of Hours’ was also published here in 1632 — ‘Eucharistion’, a panegyric dedicated to Petro Mohyla. The publications of the Pechersk printing house were distinguished by their high printing quality.

Alongside the printing house of the Pechersky Monastery, private printing houses owned by Tymofiy Verbytsky and Spyrydon Sobol operated in Kiev in the 1620s.

=== Education ===
In the second half of the 16th century and the first half of the 17th century, education in Kiev, as in other Ukrainian cities, was organised in schools attached to churches and monasteries. In particular, there is mention of a school attached to the St. Michael's Monastery. Obviously, there were also schools at the Pechersky Monastery and other monasteries and churches in the city. There, children learned to read, write, count, and sing.

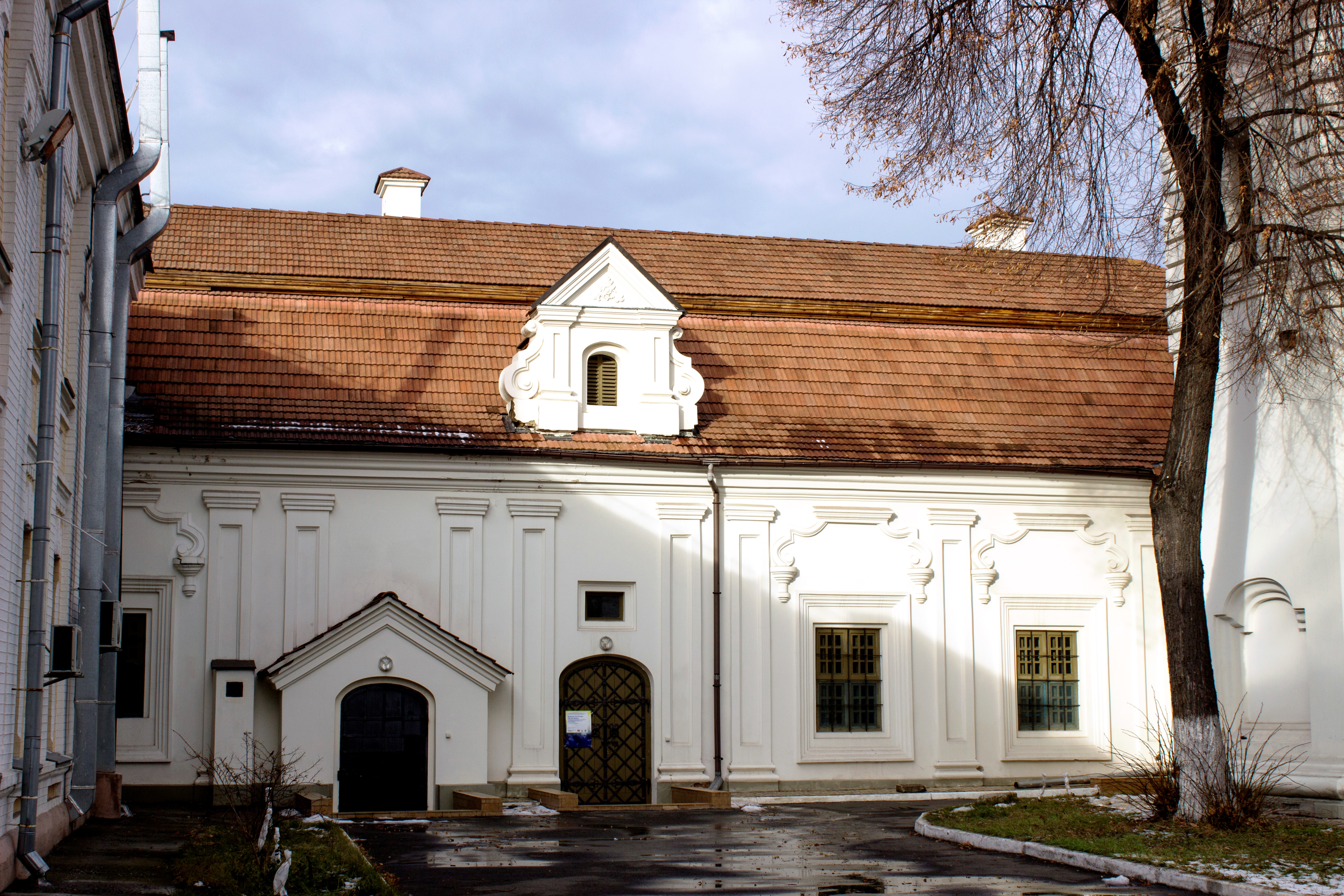
The House of Halshka Hulevychivna is the oldest preserved building in Kyiv. In 1615, Halshka Hulevychivna donated this building and the land adjacent to it for the establishment of a brotherhood school, hospital, and monastery.

In 1615, Kievan citizens, nobility, and clergy organised the Kyiv Epiphany Brotherhood and a school attached to it. The Kyiv Brotherhood School consisted of five grades. The school curriculum included the study of the ‘seven liberal arts’ — grammar, rhetoric, dialectics, arithmetic, astronomy, and music. Significant attention to the study of Greek and Church Slavonic languages defined it as ‘Greek-Slavonic.’ The activities of the Kievan and other brotherhood schools were based on the charter of the Lviv School, ‘School Order’ (1586). In 1631, Petro Mohyla founded a new school at the Pechersk Monastery, modelled on Latin-Polish colleges. It differed from the brotherhood school primarily in that it placed great emphasis on the study of Latin. The school's curriculum is reflected in the panegyric ‘Eucharistion’. The founding of the Lavra school caused concern among the townspeople, who feared the possible decline of the brotherhood school.

As a result of the compromise of 1632, the two schools were merged to form the Mohyla Academy, which was a higher education institution. In the 1630s and 1640s, it consisted of seven classes. In the lower classes — preparatory, infim, grammar, and syntax — students studied the grammar of Church Slavonic, Ruthenian (Old Ukrainian), Latin, Polish, and Greek. In the middle classes, rhetoric and poetics were taught, and in the upper classes, philosophy and theology. The course of study was 12 years. Like all Western European schools, the teaching was scholastic in nature and was conducted mainly in Latin.

Kiev had strong ties with many centres of science and education in Western and Central Europe. Many Kievan residents received their education at the leading universities of the time. Their names are recorded in the lists of the University of Padua, the University of Bologna, the University of Paris, and universities in some German cities. Most Kievan students studied at the universities of Prague, Krakow, and Sorbonne.

=== Architecture and arts ===
During the 14th and early 16th centuries, there was a desire to restore the architectural forms of pre-Mongol Rus. In particular, at the end of the 14th century, the St. Michael's Golden-Domed Monastery was restored, and in 1470, the Assumption Cathedral of the Pechersk Monastery. Original stone construction was also restored in Kiev. Next to the modern Borychev Descent, archaeologists discovered the remains of a stone church dating from the 14th to early 16th centuries. The floor of the building is made of glazed tiles, and fragments of frescoes have been found.

Around 1610, the stone St. Nicholas Church of the Dominican Monastery was built in Podil. The three-nave, six-column basilica was built in the late Gothic style. It had ribbed vaults, lancet windows, and high lancet triangular pediments on the western and eastern facades, which were characteristic of this style.

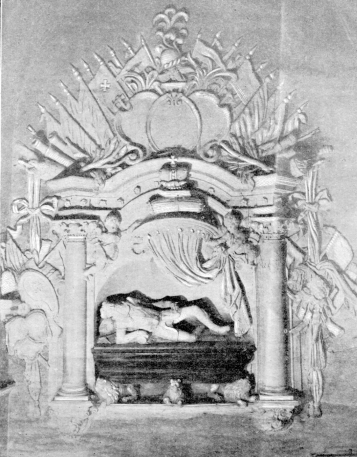
The tomb of Prince Konstanty Ostrogski in the Assumption Cathedral of the Pechersk Monastery (lost, photo from 1900)

In the 1630s, Saint Sophia Cathedral; Dormition Cathedral; St. Michael's Golden-Domed Cathedral; Pyrohoshcha Church in Podil; the Church of the Saviour at Berestove; and St. Cyril's Church were restored in Kiev.

Pre-Mongol traditions were also revived in Kievan sculpture. Three white stone polychrome reliefs, made for the Assumption Cathedral rebuilt in 1470, have been preserved. They were placed on the facade of the central apse. The central relief depicts the Virgin Mary Oranta, while the two side reliefs depict the founders of the Pechersk Monastery, Anthony and Theodosius.

There were also various branches of artistic craftsmanship and art. Frescoes were created in the restored churches and cathedrals of Kiev. Icons and artistic metalwork were created, in particular, the Pechersk art workshop produced engolpion-quadrifolia. Graffiti of Saint Sophia Cathedral from this period has been preserved on its walls.

With the spread of Renaissance ideas of humanism, the art of painting and iconography developed. In the 16th and 17th centuries, the faces of saints took on the features of real people, landscapes resembled real scenery, and icons were filled with lyricism. Researchers believe that there was a Kievan school of painting, but due to historical circumstances, most of the works have not survived. During this period, Kievan artists created the icons ‘Mykola Mokry’ (St. Sophia Cathedral), ‘Igor's Mother of God’ (Assumption Cathedral), and ‘Nativity of the Mother of God’ (now located in the city of Ivankiv, Kyiv Oblast). The genre of portraiture developed in Ukrainian painting. Kievan churches were decorated with ornamental carvings on wood and stone, in particular when creating iconostases. Among the monuments of sculpture, the tombstone of Ostrogski at the prince's burial place in the Assumption Cathedral of the Pechersk Monastery is well known. With the spread of book printing, the art of book engraving developed.

== See also ==
- History of Kyiv
  - Kiev in the Golden Horde period (1240–1362)
  - History of Kyiv (1657–1811)
  - History of Kyiv (1811–1917)
- List of mayors of Kyiv
- Principality of Kiev
- Kiev Voivodeship

== Sources ==
- Antonovych, Volodymyr; Ternovsky, Pylyp Oleksiyovich, eds. (1874). Сборникъ матеріаловъ для исторической топографіи Кіева и его окрестностей (у III розділах) [Collection of materials for the historical topography of Kiev and its surroundings (in three sections)] (in Russian (Petrine orthography)). Kyiv, Ukraine: E.Y. Fedorov.
- Artemenko, I., ed. (1984). Древний и средневековый Киев [Ancient and Medieval Kyiv]. History of Kyiv (in Ukrainian). Vol. 1. Kyiv, Ukraine: Naukova Dumka Publishing House.
- Bilous, Natalia Oleksijivna (2008). Київ наприкінці XIV — у першій половині XVII століття. Міська влада і самоврядування [Kyiv at the end of the 14th century — first half of the 17th century. City authorities and self-government.] (PDF) (in Ukrainian). Kyiv: Publishing House Kyiv-Mohyla Academy. ISBN 978-966-518-450-8. Archived (PDF) from the original on 9 September 2025.
- Dundulis, Bronius (2004). "Švitrigaila". In Spečiūnas, Vytautas (ed.). Lietuvos valdovai (XIII-XVIII a.): enciklopedinis žinynas (in Lithuanian). Vilnius, Lithuania: Mokslo ir enciklopedijų leidybos institutas. ISBN 978-5-420-01535-3.
- Ernst, F., ed. (1930). КИЇВ: Провідник [Kyiv: A Guide] (in Ukrainian). All-Ukrainian Academy of Sciences.
- Isichenko, Ihor (2008). Історія Христової церкви в Україні [History of the Church of Christ in Ukraine] (in Ukrainian). Kharkiv, Ukraine: Acts.
- Ivakin, Hleb Yuriyovych (1996). Історичний розвиток Києва XIII — середина XVI ст [Historical development of Kyiv in the 13th to mid-16th centuries] (in Ukrainian). Kyiv: Naukova Dumka. ISBN 978-5-85654-047-4.
- Kapral, Myron (2009). "Своєрідність київського маґдебурзького права: нотатки на марґінесі нової книги про Київ кінця XV – першої половини XVII століть" [The Distinctiveness of Kyiv's Magdeburg Law: Marginal Notes on a New Book about Kyiv from the End of the 15th to the First Half of the 17th Century]. Ukrainian Archeographic Yearbook. New Series (in Ukrainian) (13/14). Kyiv, Ukraine.
- Kovpanenko, Natalia Hryhorivna (2003). "Вестерфельд Абрагам" [Westerveld Abraham]. Encyclopedia of History of Ukraine (in Ukrainian). Vol. 1. Kyiv: Institute of History of Ukraine. Archived from the original on 1 June 2016.
- Podhorodecki, Leszek (1982). Dzieje Kijowa [History of Kyiv] (in Polish). Książka i Wiedza.
- Popelnytska, O. (2003). Історична топографія київського Подолу XVII — початку XIX століття [Historical topography of Kyiv Podil in the 17th–early 19th centuries]. Kyiv, Ukraine: Stylos.
- Raffensperger, Christian; Ostrowski, Donald (2023). The Ruling Families of Rus: Clan, Family and Kingdom. London: Reaktion Books. ISBN 978-1-78914-745-2.
- Sužiedėlis, Simas, ed. (1978). "Švitrigaila". Encyclopedia Lituanica. Vol. 5. Boston, Massachusetts: Juozas Kapočius. LCCN 74-114275.
- Suziedelis, Saulius A. (1997). Historical Dictionary of Lithuania. Scarecrow Press. ISBN 9780810833357.
- Urban, William (2003). Tannenberg and After. Chicago: Lithuanian Research and Studies Center. ISBN 978-0-929700-25-0.
