= Capture of Kyiv (1651) =

Event during the Khmelnytsky Uprising

- Part of the Khmelnytsky Uprising
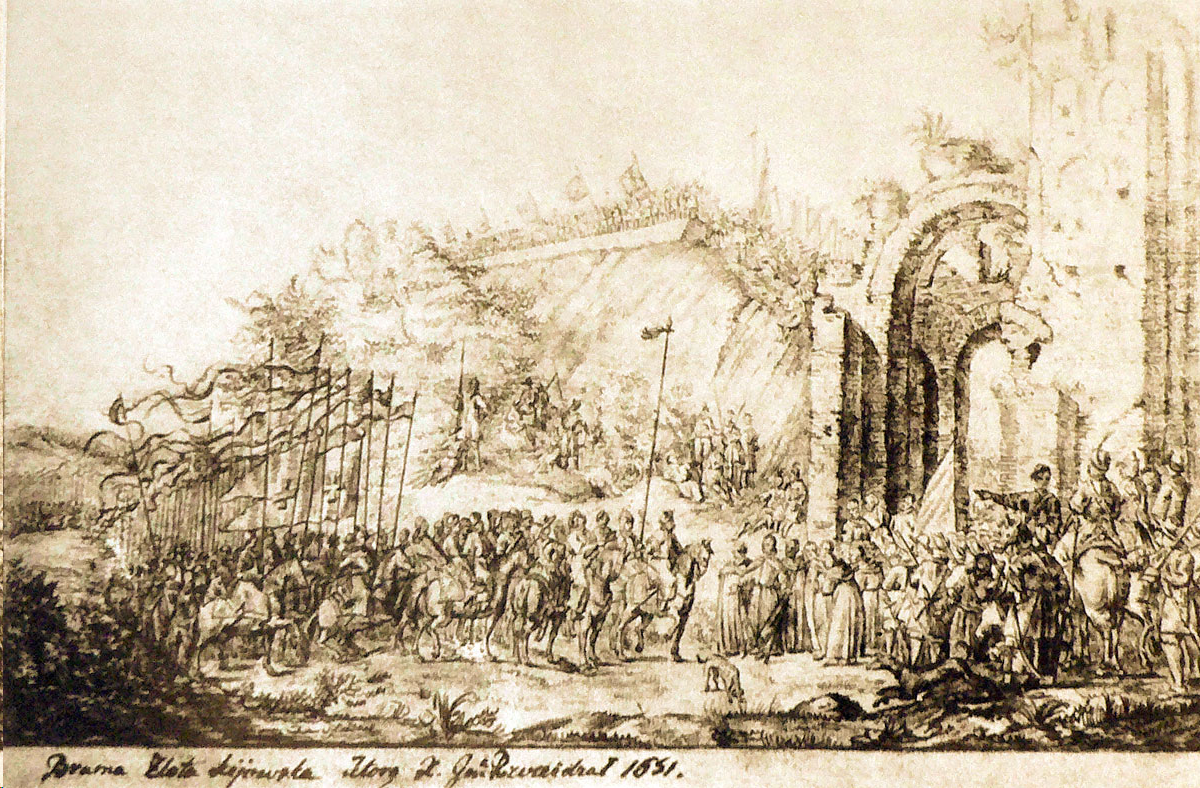
- Lithuanian army at the foot of the ruins of the Golden Gate in Kyiv in 1651, by Abraham van Westerveld
Date	4 August 1651
Location	Kyiv, Cossack Hetmanate
Result	Polish–Lithuanian victory
Territorial changes	Capture of Kyiv by the Polish-Lithuanian troops

Belligerents
Cossack Hetmanate	Polish–Lithuanian Commonwealth

Commanders and leaders
Anton Zhdanovych	Janusz Radziwiłł

Strength
Unknown	6,000 men

During the Khmelnytsky Uprising, on 4 August 1651 Kyiv was captured by Lithuanian forces under the command of Janusz Radziwiłł.

== Prelude ==
In December 1650, Sejm of the Polish-Lithuanian Commonwealth approved the general mobilization of szlachta in form of pospolite ruszenie and ordered an increase in the size of regular armed forces, with Lithuanian troops growing to 15,000 soldiers. The Polish Crown Army, in its turn, was to number 36,000 soldiers. In April 1651 Polish troops concentrated in the area of Sokal, which forced Cossack hetman Bohdan Khmelnytsky to transfer his main force to the area of Zbarazh.

Following the defeat of Khmelnytsky's troops at Berestechko, Polish armies started pursuing the Cossacks. Simultaneously, Lithuanian forces marched towards Kyiv, and after the Battle of Loyew approached the city on August 3.

== Capture ==
As the main Cossack force had been defeated at the Battle of Berestechko, Lithuanians were able to force the small garrison stationed in the city to retreat towards Trypillia. In the aftermath, Kyiv's clergy delivered Radziwiłł a letter, pleading him to spare the city.

On 4 August Lithuanian cavalry emerged from its camp in Obolon, passing St. Cyril's Church and entering Kyiv; the infantry, meanwhile, moved down the Dnieper on boats, disembarking directly in Podil, the main part of the city. Radziwiłł himself entered Kyiv along with his staff through the Golden Gate.

By that time, most Cossacks and many burghers had left the city. The Lithuanian army refrained from pillaging, although many antique items were taken away by Radziwiłł's forces.

== Aftermath and legacy ==
On 16 August a major fire started in Podil, destroying the whole neighbourhood, including the market and the city hall with all documents. 2,000 residential buildings and four wooden churches perished in flames.

Lithuanian troops withdrew from Kyiv after a one-month occupation due to an outbreak of plague, which caused heavy losses. Radziwiłł's army then moved onto Bila Tserkva in order to join the Polish forces of Mikołaj Potocki.

=== In art ===
A number of drawings dedicated to the Lithuanian capture of Kyiv was created by Dutch artist Abraham van Westerveld, an employee of hetman Radziwiłł, who was personally present during the event. During the 18th century, copies of the pictures were kept in the collection of Polish king Stanisław August Poniatowski, and some of them were later purchased by the Polish Army Museum. Westerveld's drawings are valuable historical sources, showing Kyiv's important historical landmarks, some of which have since been lost.

== Gallery ==
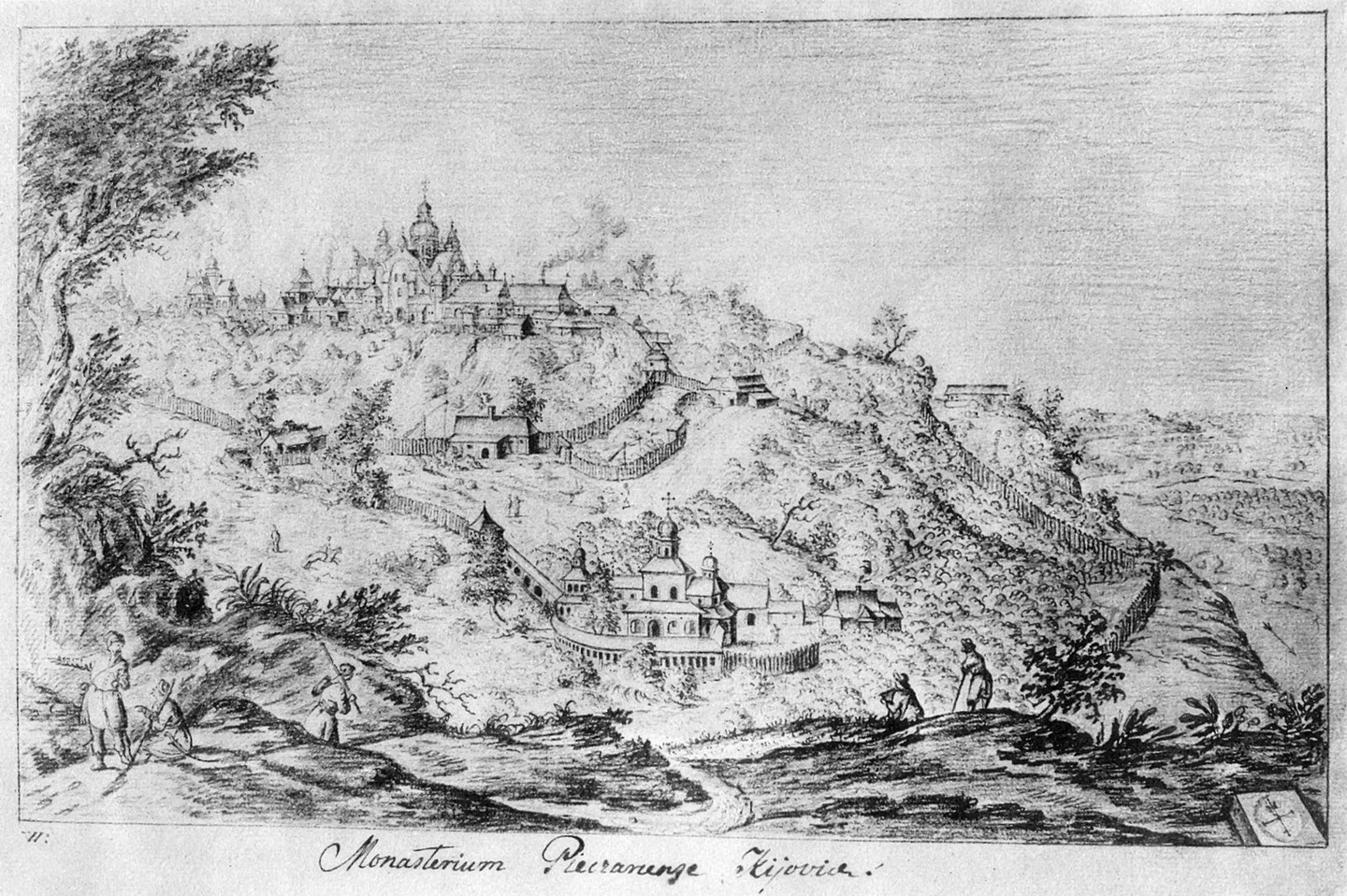
Kyiv Pechersk Lavra near Kyiv in 1651, by Abraham van Westerveld

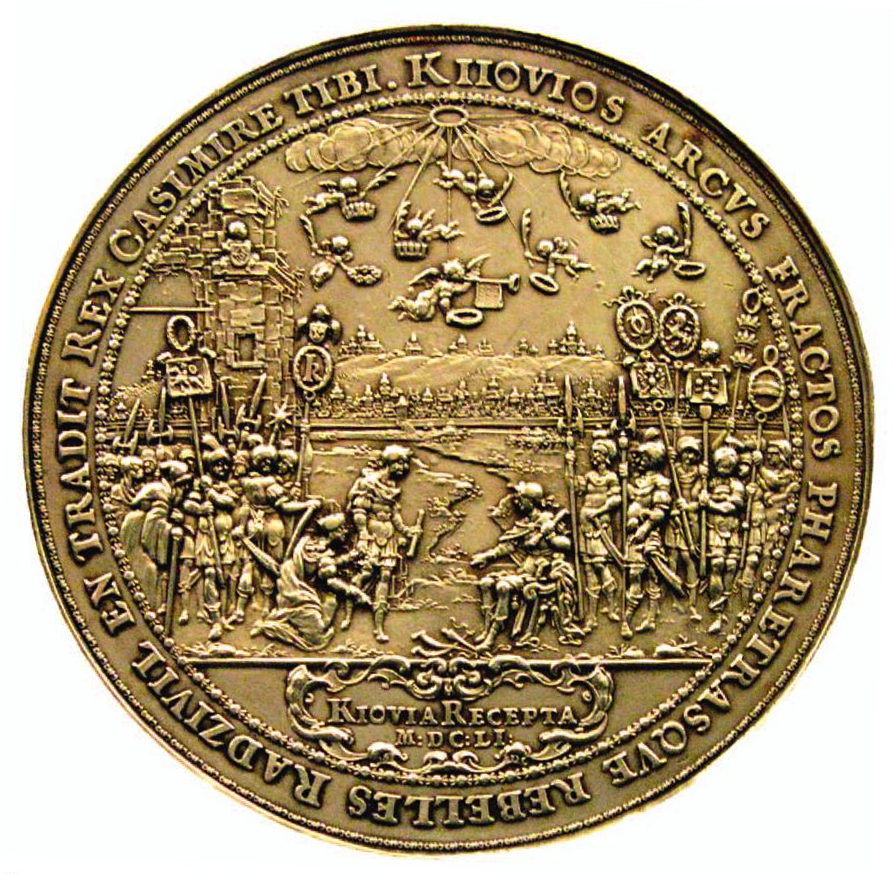
Medal minted in 1651 on the occasion of the recapture of Kiev by Janusz Radziwiłł

== Bibliography ==
- Yakovenko, Natalia (2006). An Outline History of Medieval and Early Modern Ukraine. Krytyka. ISBN 9667679829.
