= Abraham van Westerveld =

- Born: Abraham Evertszoon van Westerveld; 1620 or 1621; Rotterdam, Dutch Republic
- Died: 30 April 1692; Rotterdam, Dutch Republic
- Known for: Painting, architectural drawing
- Notable work: Cornelis Tromp in Roman Costume (Rijksmuseum); View of Kyiv from the Northeast (1651)
- Movement: Dutch Golden Age
- Patrons: Janusz Radziwiłł (1612–1655)

Abraham van Westerveld (ˈaːbrɑˌɦɑm vɑn ˈʋɛstərˌvɛlt, 1620/1621 — 30 April 1692, Rotterdam) or Abraham Evertsz. van Westerveld (Note: Some name variations found in various sources: Abraham van Westerveld, Abraham Westervelt, Abraham Westerveldt, Abraham van Westervelt, Abraham van Westerfeldt, Abraham Evertsz. Westervelt, Abraham Evertsz. van Westervelt, and so on.) was a Dutch Golden Age painter, architectural artist, and calligrapher. He spent most of his career in the Dutch Republic, and was also employed as court artist of Lithuanian hetman Janusz Radziwiłł (1612–1655) for a time in the 1650s. Westerveld is known in Ukraine (Note: His name Abraham van Westerveld is transcribed as Абрагам ван Вестерфельд, Abraham van Vesterfeld in Ukrainian.) for creating a series of sketches of architectural objects in Kyiv (then Kiev or Kijów) during this period, including the Golden Gate, Kyiv, Saint Sophia Cathedral, Kyiv, and the Kyiv Pechersk Lavra. In the Netherlands, Westerveld is famous for his painting of Dutch lieutenant admiral Cornelis Tromp in Roman Costume (c. 1680) in the Rijksmuseum, amongst other works.

== Biography ==
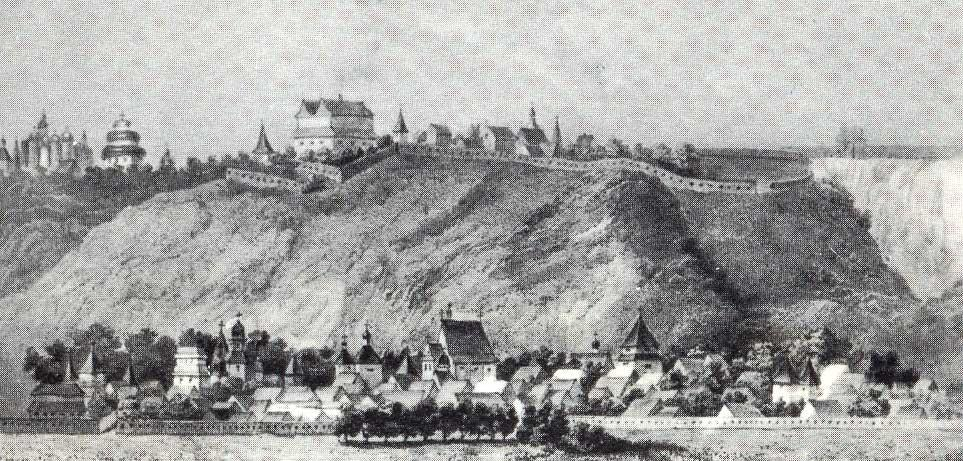
View of Kyiv from the Northeast (1651). View of Podil (Lower City). In the centre: the Dominican Church of St. Nicholas (with a Gothic roof).

Abraham was born in Rotterdam in either 1620 or 1621 as the son of a certain Evert, and probably baptised as a Remonstrant. The artist's first work dates back to 1647, which marked the beginning of his creative career. On 19 March 1645, he married Ariaantje Jans in Rotterdam. On 21 May 1647, he married for the second time to Annetje Pieters Coelentroever. From then until about 1650, he worked in Rotterdam, after which he moved to Lithuania. Possibly, he relocated as early as 1649, or as late as 1651.

For the first two years there, he worked in the service of hetman Janusz Radziwiłł of Lithuania. From 1653, Westerveld accompanied him on campaigns against the Cossacks in the Polish–Lithuanian Commonwealth during the Khmelnytsky Uprising. During this period, he had the opportunity to paint landscapes of the surroundings of Kyiv (Kijów) and Gdańsk (Danzig). The works he created to glorify Radziwiłł's military victories, scenes of war, and the prince's arrival in Kiev, are now kept in the Royal Castle in Warsaw. His panorama View of Kyiv from the Northeast (1651, depicting the chambers of Prince A. Kysil in Podil, the complex of the Kyiv-Mezhyhirsky Spaso-Preobrazhensky Monastery, the church in the village of Polonne, and so on) can be considered the only documentary image of this area as it was in the mid-17th century.

At the end of 1653, Westerveld returned to Rotterdam, where he remained the rest of this life. His second wife Annetje died on 23 October 1665. On 6 March 1667, he married for the third time, to Ariaentje Cornelis Venendaal, and on 3 March 1669, for the fourth time, to Anna le Sevyn (Lechevin) in Overschie. In 1687, Abraham became head of the local Guild of Saint Luke, and four years later, on 21 October 1691, he married for the fifth time, to Ariaantje (Arientje) Abrahams den Tret. Some months later, he died on 30 April 1692 in Rotterdam. According to other sources, he died as late as August 1692.

== Works ==
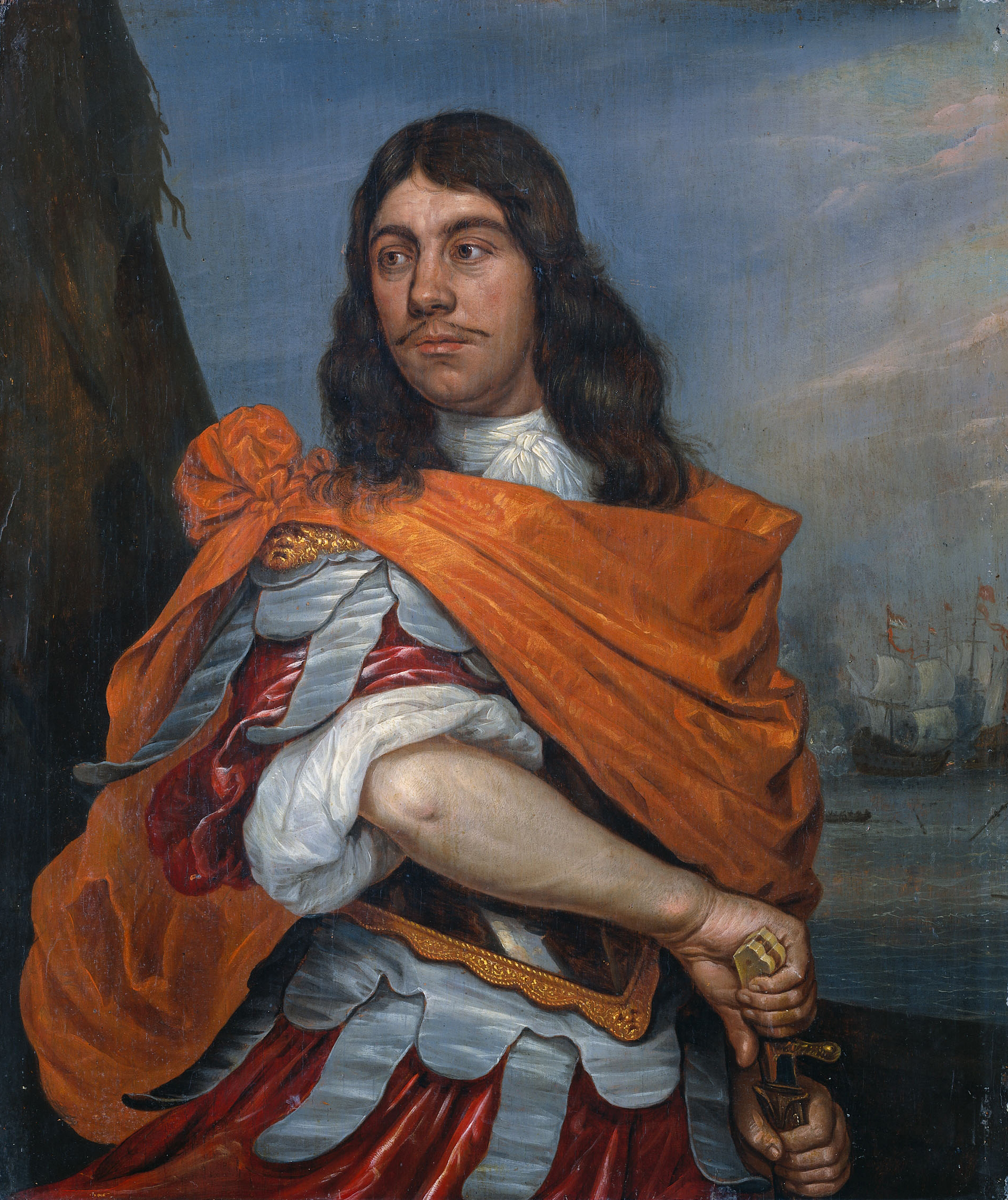
Cornelis Tromp in Roman Costume (Rijksmuseum). (Note: Previously, this painting was incorrectly attributed to Abraham Willaerts, but this attribution has now been rejected.)

Westerveld's creative legacy mainly consists of genre and historical scenes, landscapes, portraits and architecture, usually painted in oils. These include landscapes of Kyiv and Ukrainian historical themes. His oeuvre includes many portraits of admirals, probably due to his father-in-law's connections, who was a captain in the Admiralty of Amsterdam. In addition, many ornamental panels with inscriptions and coats of arms were found on his estate. Abraham is generally considered a follower of Anthonie Palamedesz..

Westerveld witnessed some of the events of the Khmelnytsky Uprising in the 1650s, which was reflected in his drawings, some of which have been preserved in 18th-century copies. There are 49 known works thematically related to Ukraine. 22 copies of 18th-century drawings were kept in the collection of Polish King Stanisław August Poniatowski (r. 1764–1795) for a certain period of time. Several copies were acquired by the Polish Army Museum in the 1990s. Based on the drawing The Capture of Cossack Colonel M. Krychevsky near Loyew in 1649, a tapestry was woven in 1760, which is now kept in the Czartoryski Museum in Kraków. Some scenes of the campaign are now in the print room of the University of Warsaw Library.

Particularly valuable drawings include: The Cossack Envoys to Radziwiłł alias Reception of Ambassadors of Bohdan Khmelnytsky by Janusz Radziwiłł, Entry of Lithuanian Troops into Kyiv in 1651, The Defeat of the Lithuanian Flotilla by Cossacks on the Dnipro, and Clash of Polish and Cossack Cavalry near Kyiv. There is a suggestion that engraver Willem Hondius used a drawing of Westerveld as a basis for his famous portrait of Bohdan Khmelnytsky, which served as the primary source for most portraits of the commander.

When Westerveld returned to the Dutch Republic, he created several new works, many of which are listed on an inventory he submitted to the Orphan Chamber on 27 November 1666, following the death of his second wife, Annetje Pieters Coelentroever. His "wares" include portraits of numerous admirals, thirty paintings of the five kings, large and small portraits of his father and mother, as well as portraits of his son, two landscapes, two waterscapes, a kitchen interior, and more.

== Gallery ==
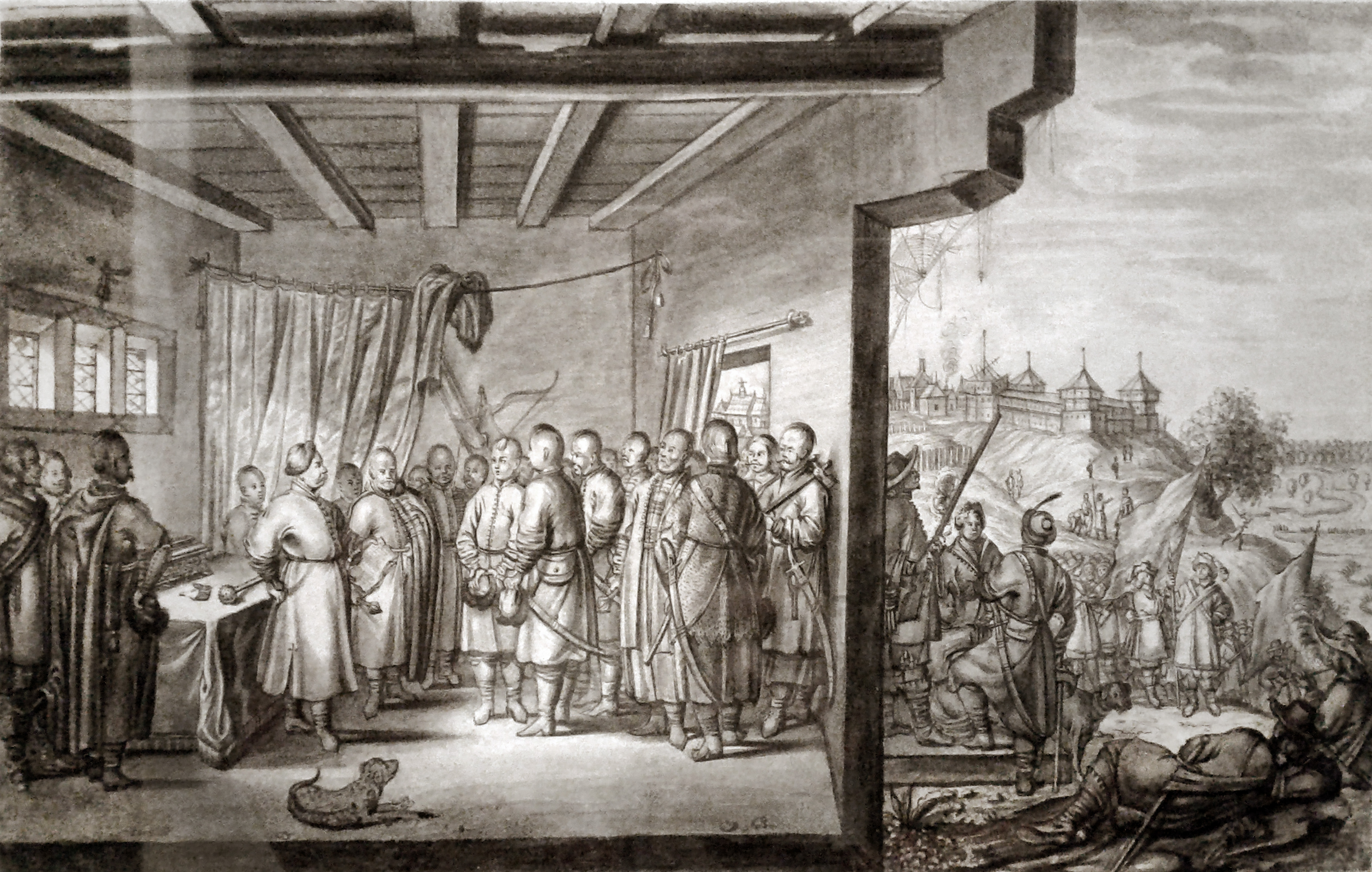
Reception of Bohdan Khmelnytsky's envoys by Janusz Radziwiłł (1651)

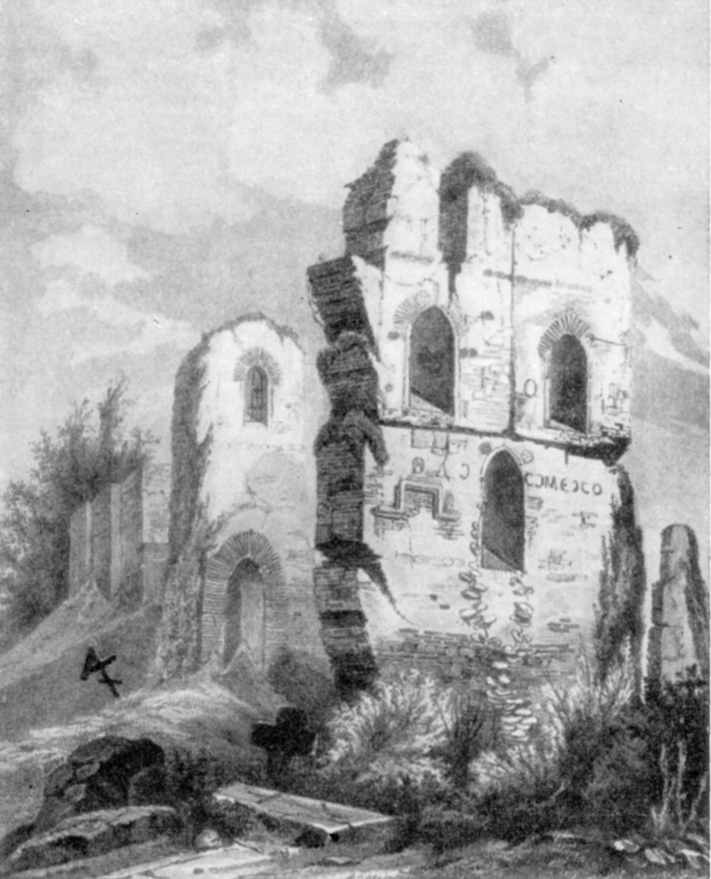
Ruins of the Church of the Tithes

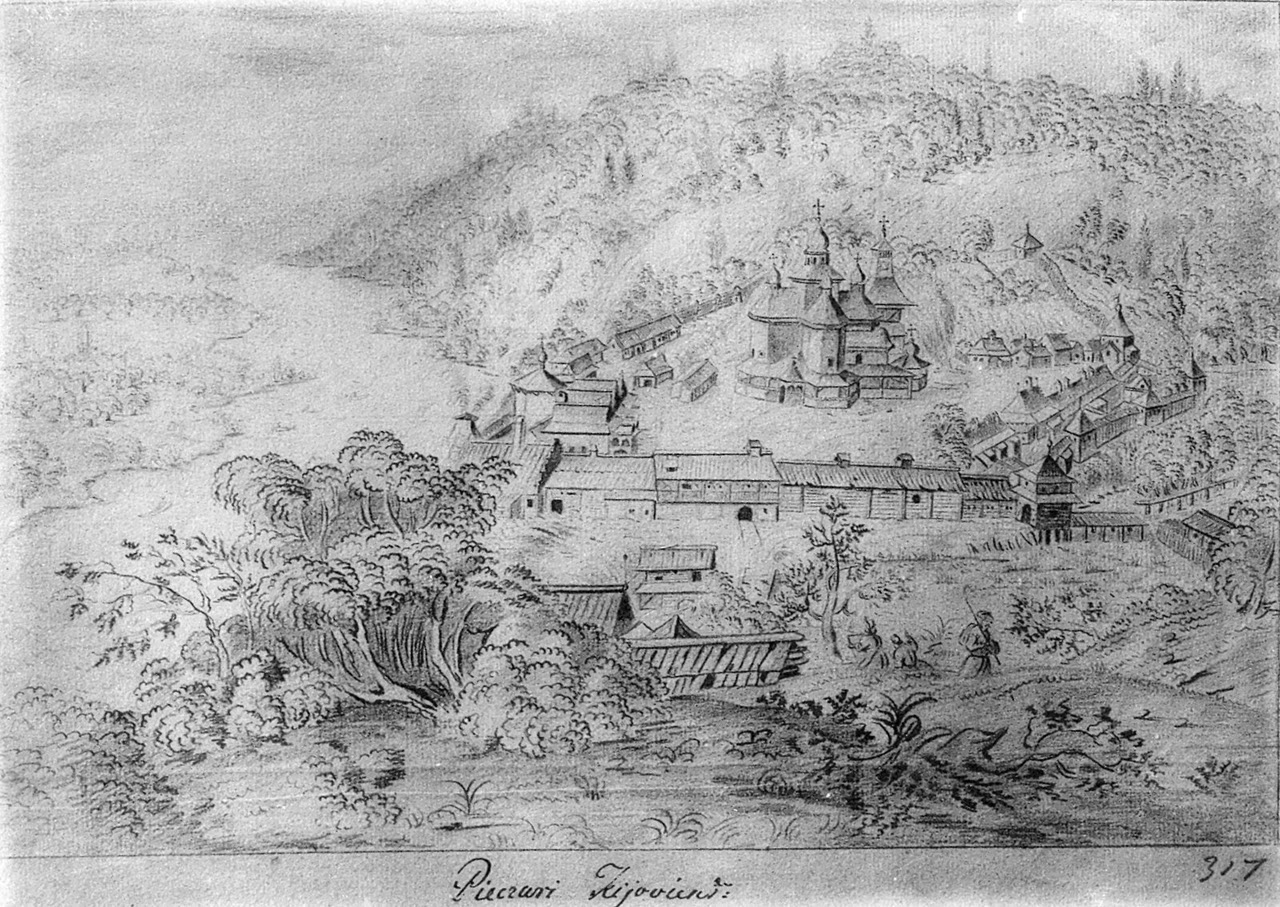
Mezhyhirya Monastery in 1650

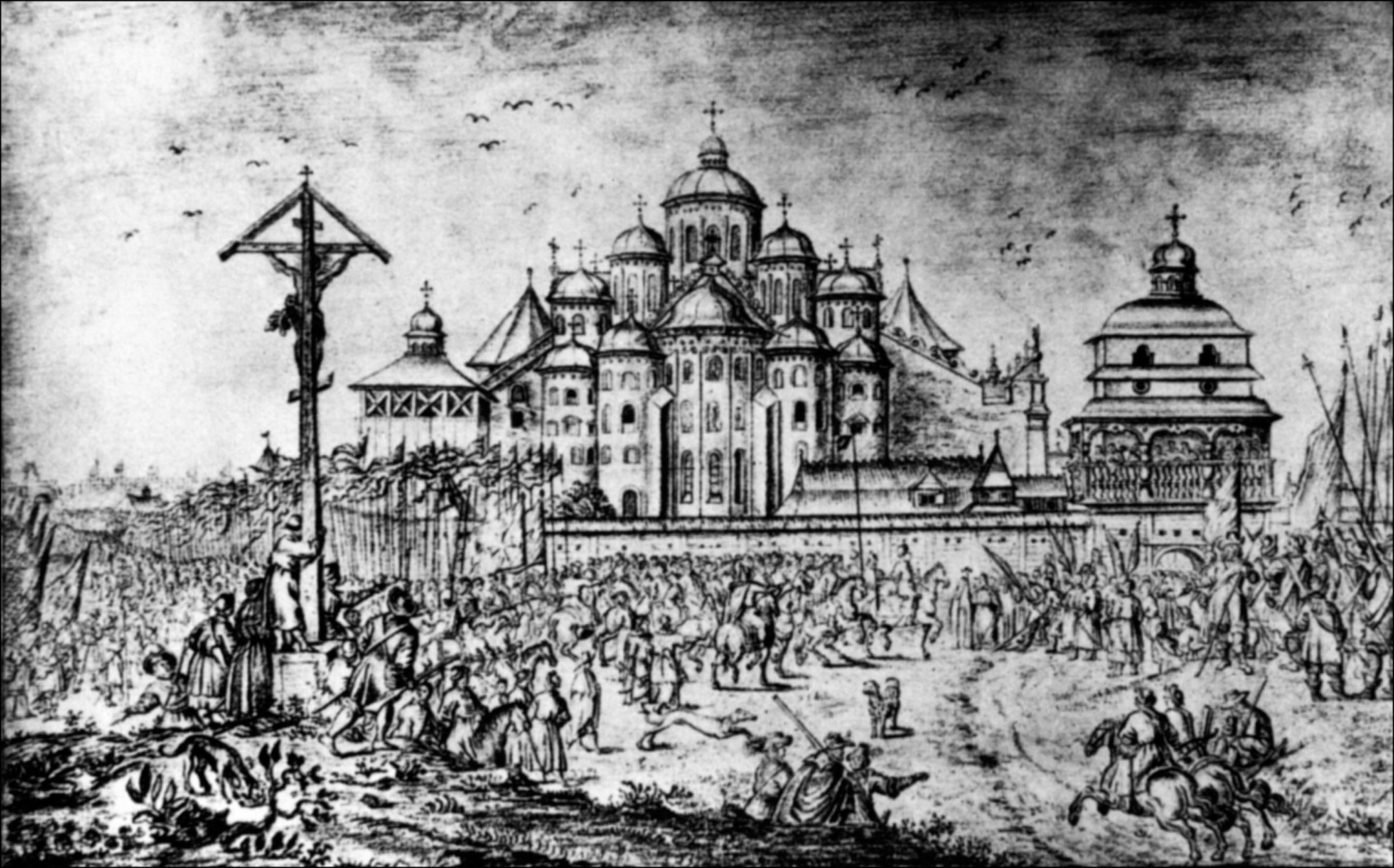
Saint Sophia Cathedral, Kyiv in 1651

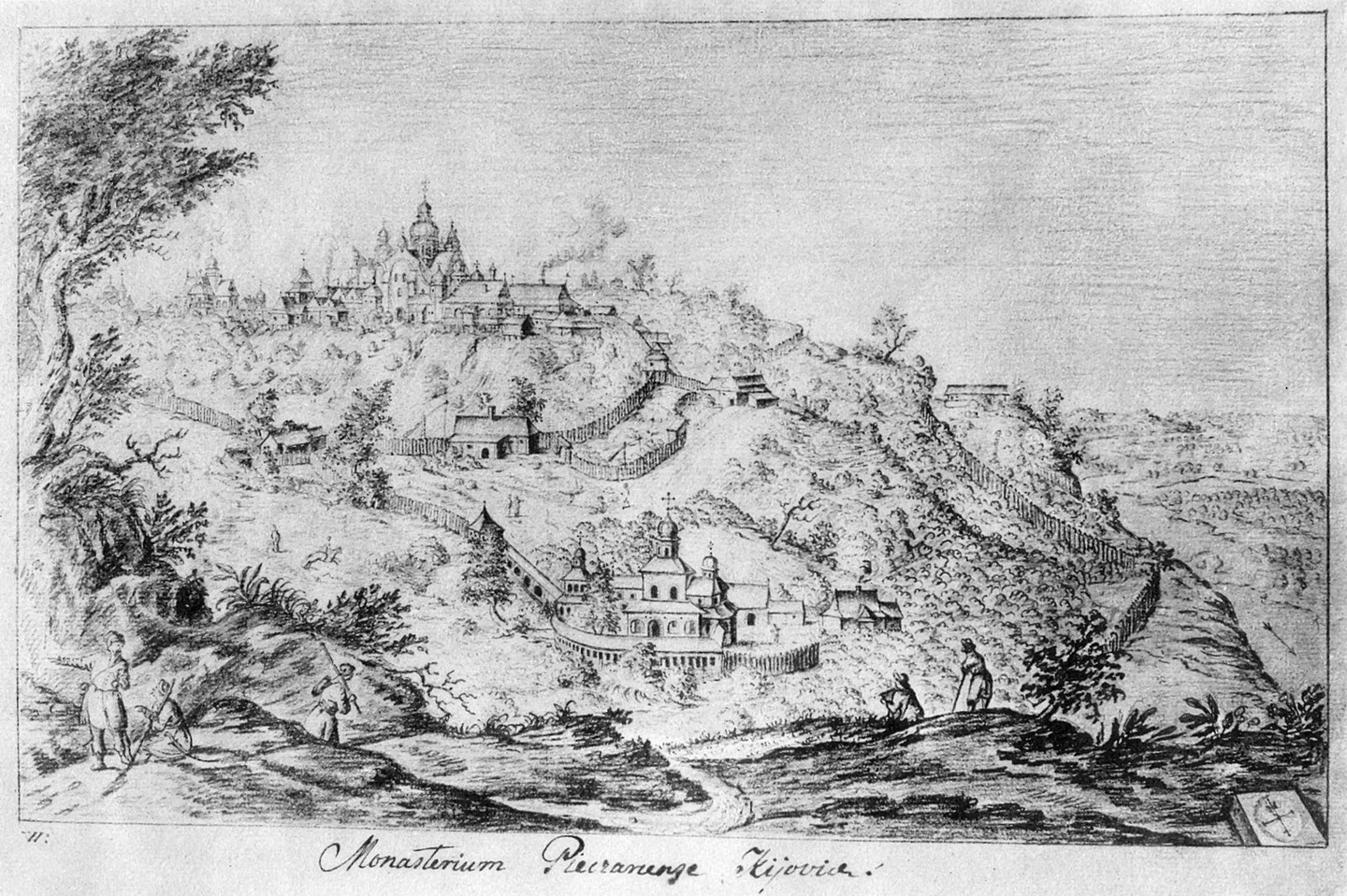
Kyiv Pechersk Lavra in 1651

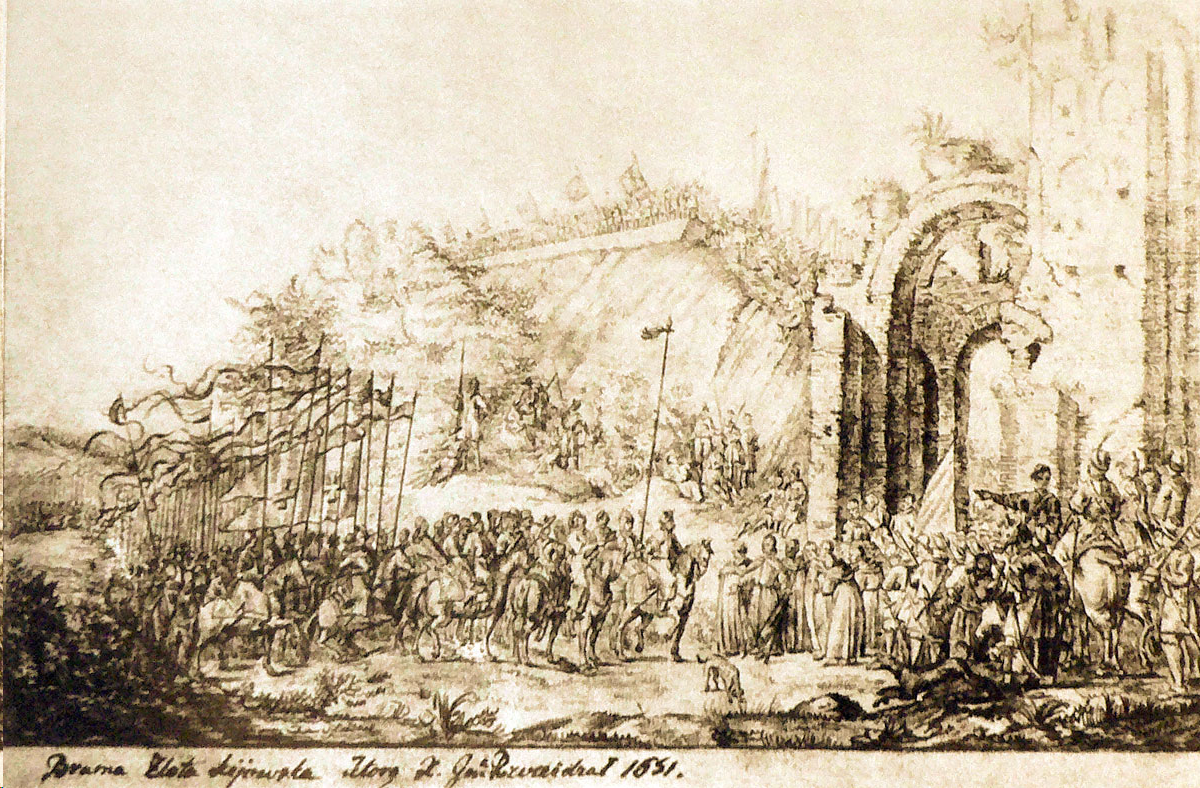
Lithuanian army entering Kiev through the Golden Gate's ruins in 1651

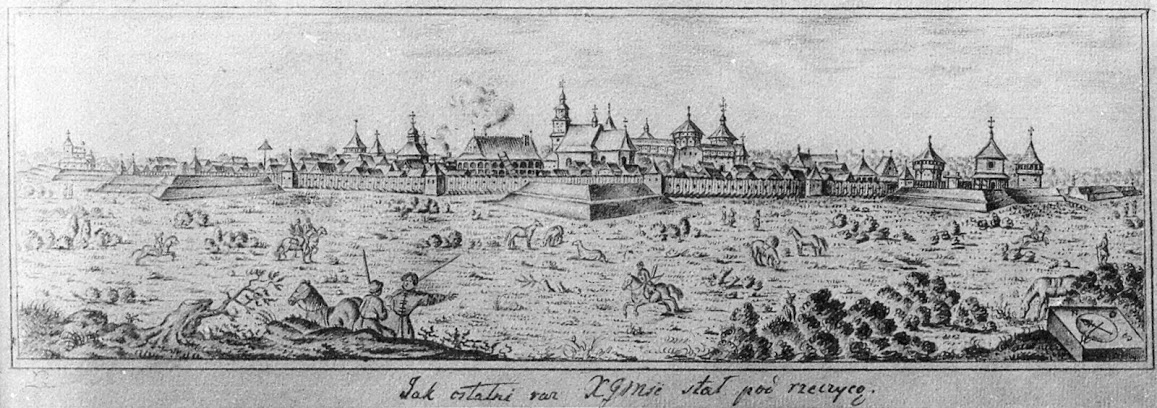
City of Rechytsa

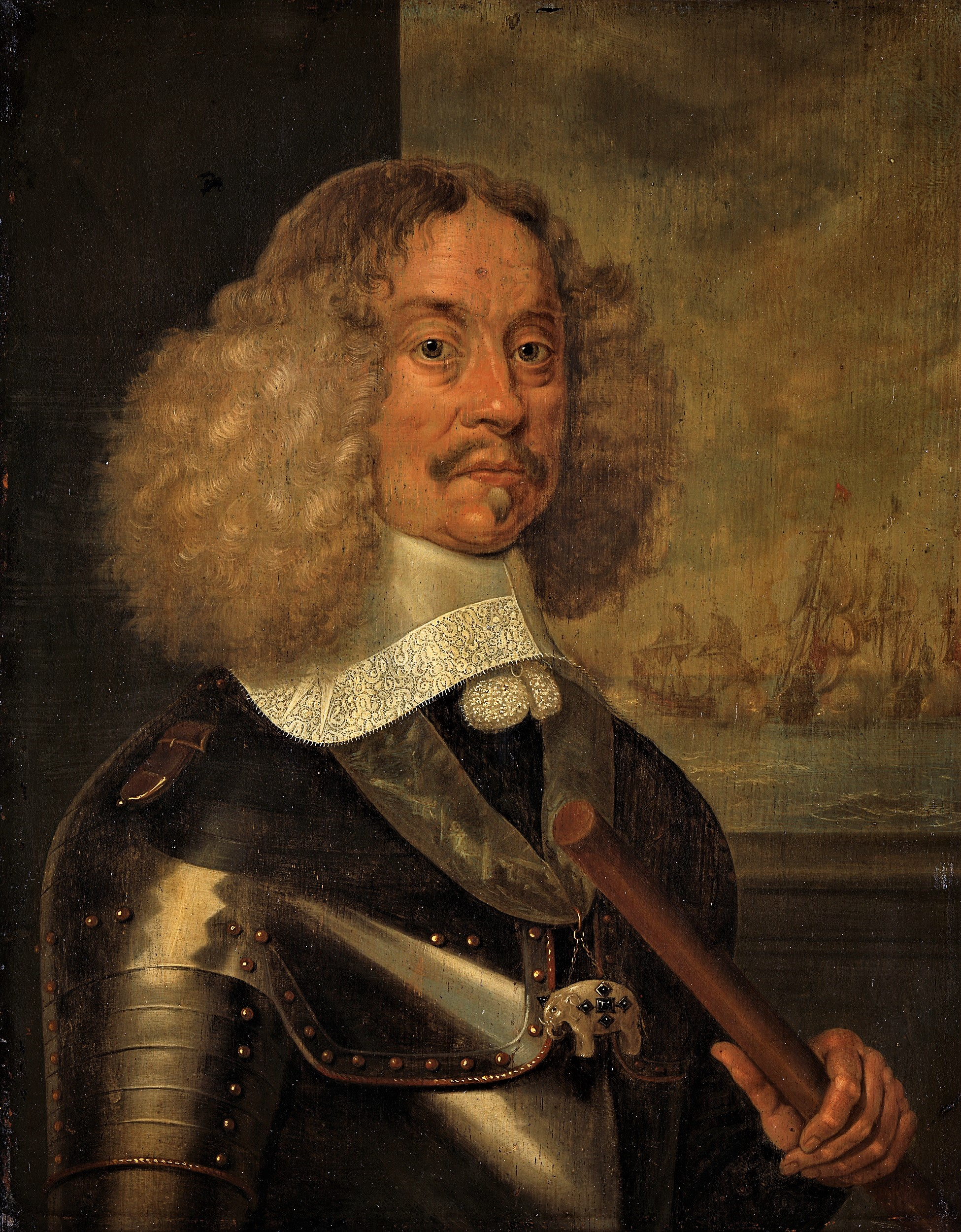
Dutch admiral Jacob van Wassenaer Obdam

== Literature ==
- Wiersum, Eppe (1937). "WESTERVELT (Abraham Evertsz.)". Nieuw Nederlandsch Biografisch Woordenboek [New Dutch Biographical Dictionary] (in Dutch). Vol. 10. Leiden: Sijthoff. pp. 1181–1182.
- Pavlo Mykolayovych Zholtovsky, Словник-довідник художників, що працювали на Україні в XIV—XVIII ст. [Reference dictionary of artists who worked in Ukraine in the 14th–18th centuries.] / Художнє життя на Україні в XVI—XVIII ст. [Artistic life in Ukraine in the 16th–18th centuries.]. (1983). Kiev: Naukova Dumka. p. 120.
- Kovpanenko, Natalia Hryhorivna (2003). "Вестерфельд Абрагам" [Westerveld Abraham]. Encyclopedia of History of Ukraine (in Ukrainian). Vol. 1. Kyiv: Institute of History of Ukraine. p. 688. Archived from the original on 1 June 2016.
