= Kiev Psalter of 1397 =

East Slavic illustrated manuscript

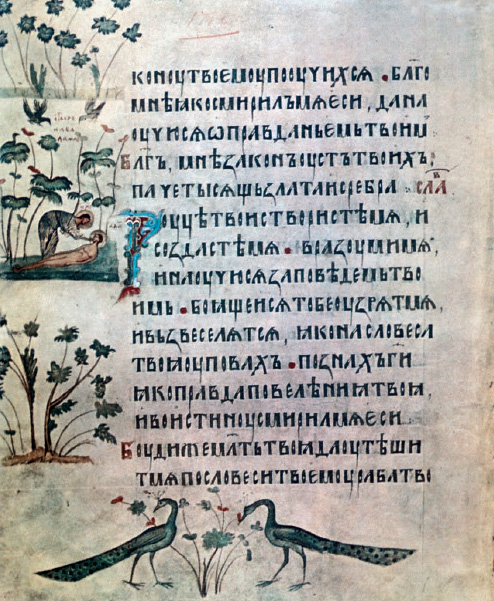
A page from the psalter illustrating the creation of Adam and his life in Paradise

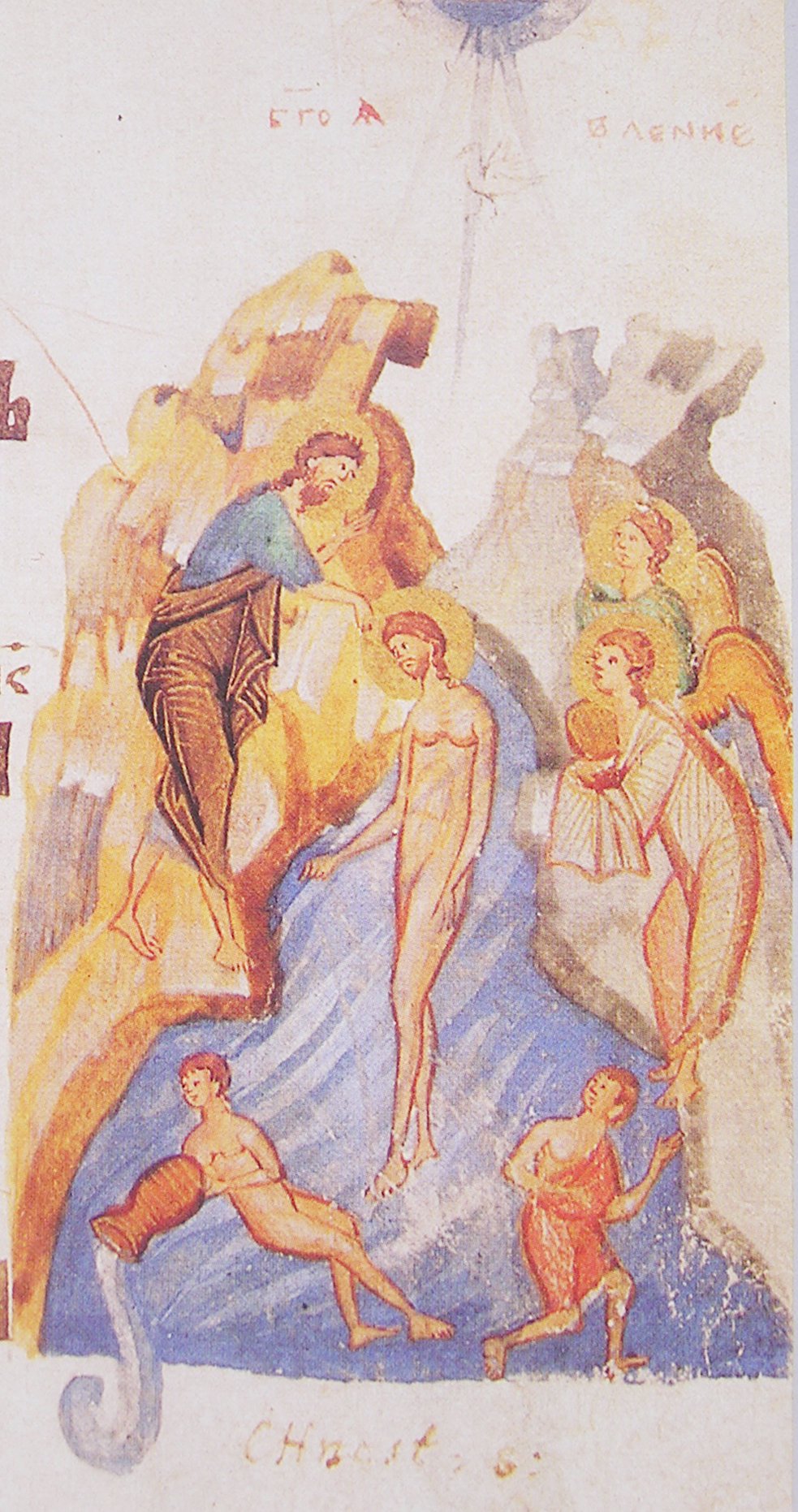
Miniature showing the baptism of Jesus

The Kiev Psalter of 1397, or Spiridon Psalter, is one of the most famous East Slavic illuminated manuscripts, containing over three hundred miniatures. It was written in 1397 by the scribe, Archdeacon Spiridon in Kiev, "at the command of Bishop Mikhail"; however, both scribe and patron had recently arrived from Moscow, and the decorations were probably added there later, in a refined and lively style, closely following a Byzantine 11th century Psalter.

== Printing ==
Many of the miniatures illustrate—often not very closely—passages from a psalm, with thin red lines drawn between miniature and text to indicate the passage intended (compare the Chludov Psalter). Sometimes the meaning of the illustration is explained in long notes in the same thin red draft (apparently original). Each leaf is about 30 x 24.5 cm, larger than a typical Byzantine psalter. The weighty and elegant script and large size of the page adds to the impressiveness of the book.

== History ==
The Psalter passed through the hands of numerous Lithuanian nobles before being sold to the Russian Count Sergey Sheremetev in the mid-19th century. Courtesy of the count, its first printed edition was prepared by Nikodim Kondakov and Fyodor Buslaev. In 1932, the Sheremetev Library merged into the Russian National Library in St Petersburg.
