= Timeline of Kyiv =

The following is a timeline of the history of the city of Kyiv, Ukraine.

== Prior to 13th century ==
- 882 - Capital of Rus'.
- 968 - Town besieged by the Pechenegs.
- 988 - Kyiv becomes a Christian town.
- 996 - Church of the Tithes consecrated.
- 1017 - Fire.
- 1018 - Bolesław I's intervention in the Kyivan succession crisis.
- 1037
  - Cathedral of St. Sophia built.
  - Golden Gate erected.
- 1051
  - Kyiv Pechersk Lavra founded.
  - Hilarion appointed Metropolitan bishop.
- 1052 - St. George church built (approximate date).
- 1077 - Vydubychi Monastery established.
- 1089 - Uspenski Cathedral consecrated.
- 1108
  - Monastery of St. Michael founded.
  - Gate Church of the Trinity (Pechersk Lavra) built.
- 1125 - Church of the Saviour at Berestove built (approximate date).
- 1140 - St. Cyril's Monastery founded.
- 1169 - Town sacked by forces of Andrey Bogolyubsky.
- 1171 - Town sacked by forces of Svyetoslav Vsevolodovitch.

== 13th-16th centuries ==
- c. 1200–1204 – Roman the Great, prince of Kingdom of Galicia–Volhynia, captured Kyiv from the grand prince of Kyiv. According to Magocsi (2010), this happened in 1200; according to Katchanovski et al. (2013) in 1203; according to the Encyclopedia of Ukraine (1993) in 1204.
- c. 1203–1204 – Town sacked by forces of Rurik Rostislavich. According to Magocsi (2010), this happened in 1203 after Roman had captured Kyiv, and so Rurik 'retook' it with the help of Cumans (Polovtsians) and Chernihivians; according to Baedeker (1914), it happened in 1204.
- 1239 – Danylo of Galicia captured Kyiv.
- 1240 – Siege and sack of Kyiv by Mongol forces under Batu Khan.
- 1299 - Metropolitan bishop Maximus relocates to Vladimir.
- 1320 - Gediminas, Duke of Lithuania in power.
- 1362 - Kyiv becomes part of the Grand Duchy of Lithuania.
- 1397 - Spiridon Psalter created.
- 1471 - Kyiv Voivodeship established.
- 1483 - Town sacked by forces of Meñli I Giray, Khan of the Crimea.
- 1496 - Town besieged by Tartars.
- 1500 - Town besieged by Tartars.

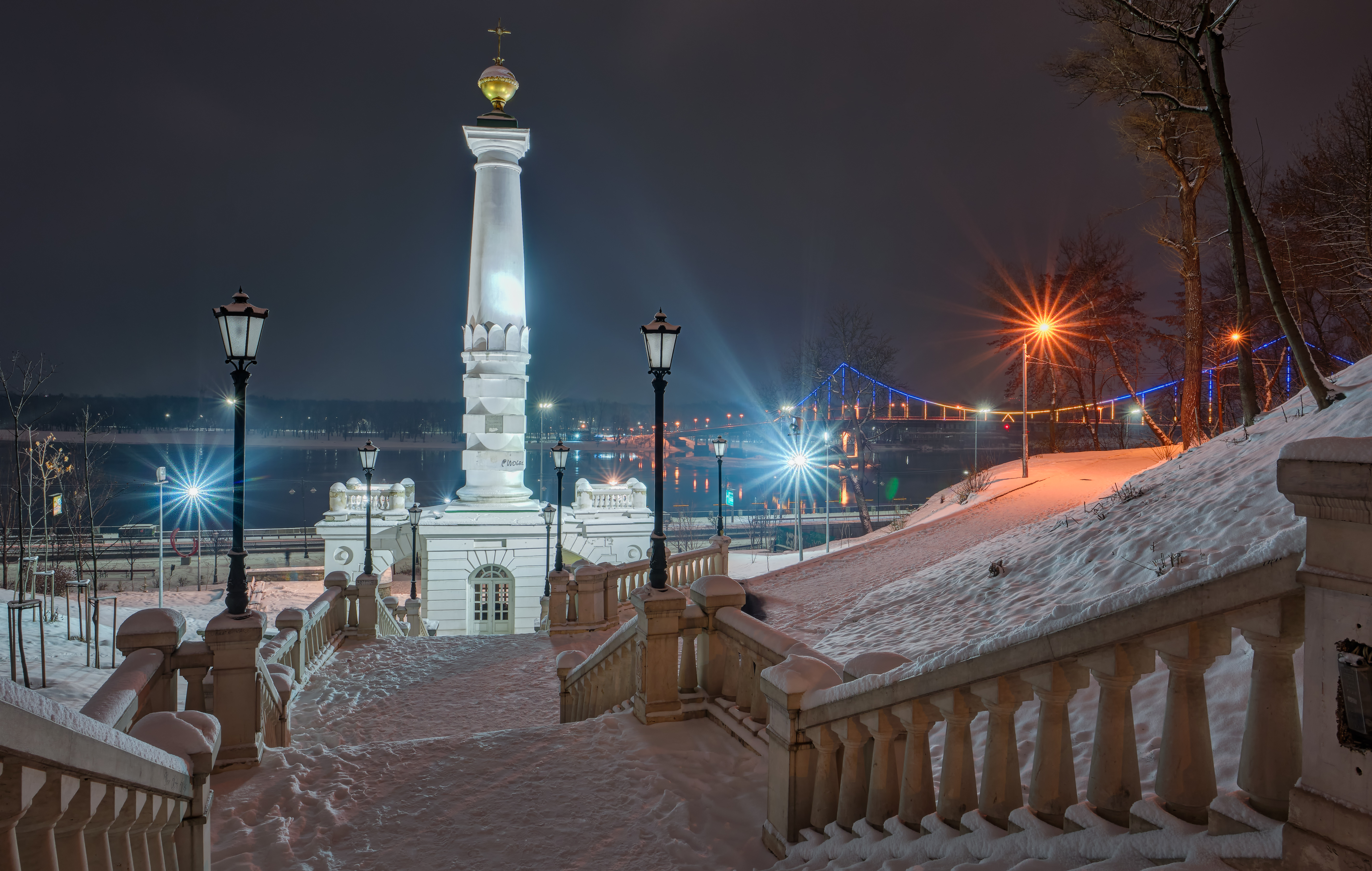
Monument to Magdeburg Rights

- 1516 - Magdeburg rights granted by Sigismund I the Old.
- 1569 - Kyiv becomes part of Poland.

== 17th-18th centuries ==
- 1619 - Jews expelled from Kyiv.
- 1632 - Mohyla Collegium formed.
- 1660 - Russo-Polish War (1654–1667): Armenians expelled by Tsar Alexis of Russia.
- 1667 - Truce of Andrusovo leads to Kyiv temporarily becoming part of the Tsardom of Russia.
- 1686 - Eternal Peace Treaty of 1686 makes the transfer to Russia permanent.
- 1693 - Cathedral of the Epiphany built.
- 1696 - St. Nicholas Cathedral consecrated.
- 1701 - Imperial Theological Academy formed.
- 1708 - Kiev Governorate founded.
- 1732 - Florivsky Convent church dedicated.
- 1745 - Great Lavra Bell Tower built.
- 1749 - Fountain of Samson constructed.
- 1752 - Mariinskyi Palace built.
- 1754 - St Andrew's Church built.
- 1756 - Klov Palace built.
- 1764 - Kyiv Arsenal established.
- 1782 - Coat of arms of Kyiv redesigned.
- 1797 - Contracts fair transferred to Kyiv from Dubno.

== 19th century ==
- 1806 - The First City Theatre (Kyiv) inaugurated.
- 1810
  - City subdivided into 4 administrative districts.
  - Chapel built at Askold's Tomb.
- 1811 - Great fire of Podil.
- 1817 - Contracts House rebuilt.
- 1833 - Baikove Cemetery established.
- 1834 - Vladimir University relocates to Kyiv from Vilna.
- 1835
  - Town government format replaces Magdeburg rights.
  - Population: 29,000.
- 1837 - City expands.
- 1838 - Kyiv Institute for Noble Maidens organized.
- 1839 - Botanical Garden established.
- 1840
  - Kyiv subject to common civil law.
  - Medical society organized.
- 1843 - Archaeological commission organized.
- 1844 - Mariinskyi Palace built.
- 1846 - Brotherhood of Saints Cyril and Methodius active.
- 1849 - Church of St. Alexander built.
- 1853 - Vladimir Monument erected.
- 1853 - Nicholas Chain Bridge built.
- 1857
  - Związek Trojnicki, a secret organization of Polish students, established at the University of Kyiv.
  - Lutheran Church built.
- 1862 - Population: 70,341.
- 1863
  - Philharmonic Society founded.
  - Lukyanivska Prison commissioned.
- 1864 - Trinity Monastery of St. Jonas founded.
- 1866 - City public library opens.
- 1869 - Naturalists' society organized.

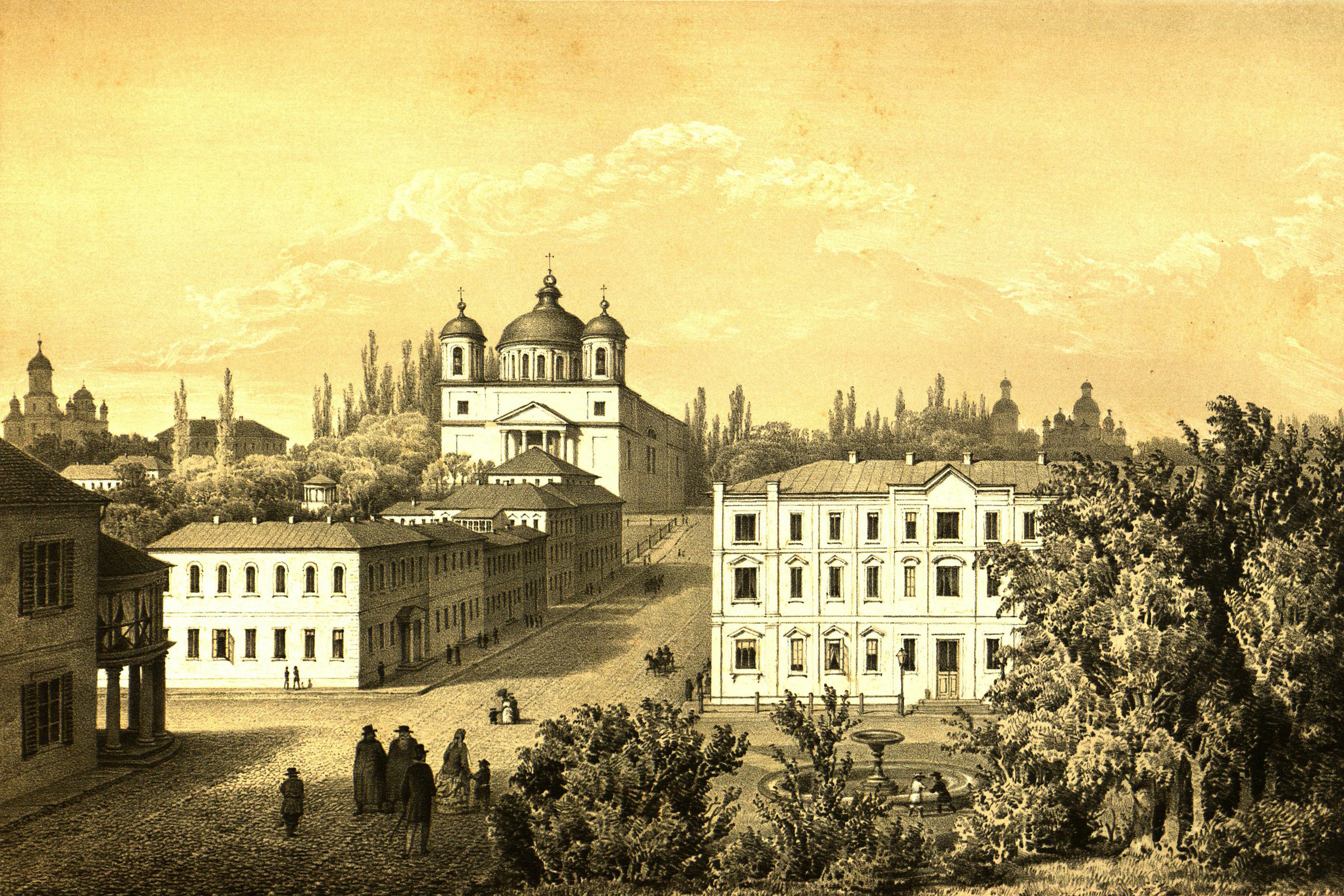
Kyiv in the 1870s (by Napoleon Orda)

- 1870
  - Railroad station built.
  - Struve Railroad Bridge constructed.
- 1874 - Population: 127,251.
- 1875 - Horticultural society organized.
- 1876
  - Juridical society organized.
  - Kyiv City Duma building constructed.
- 1877 - City Hall built.
- 1879
  - Kurenivka, Lukyanovka, Shuliavka, and Solomenka become part of Kiev.
  - Dramatic society organized.
- 1881 - Pogrom against Jews.
- 1882
  - St Volodymyr's Cathedral built.
  - Philharmonic building constructed.
- 1883 - Exchange building constructed.
- 1887 - Palais Khanenko established.
- 1891 - Horse-drawn tram begins operating.
- 1892 - Electric trams are inaugurated, becoming the first electric tram system in the Russian empire.
- 1896 - Cathedral of St. Vladimir built.
- 1897 - Population: 248,750.
- 1898
  - Brodsky Choral Synagogue built.
  - Polytechnic Institute and City Museum of Antiques and Art founded.
- 1899
  - Darnytsia Railway Station opens.
  - National Folk Decorative Art Museum established.
- 1900 - Museum of Art and Archaeology and Kyiv Municipal Theatre built.

== 20th century ==
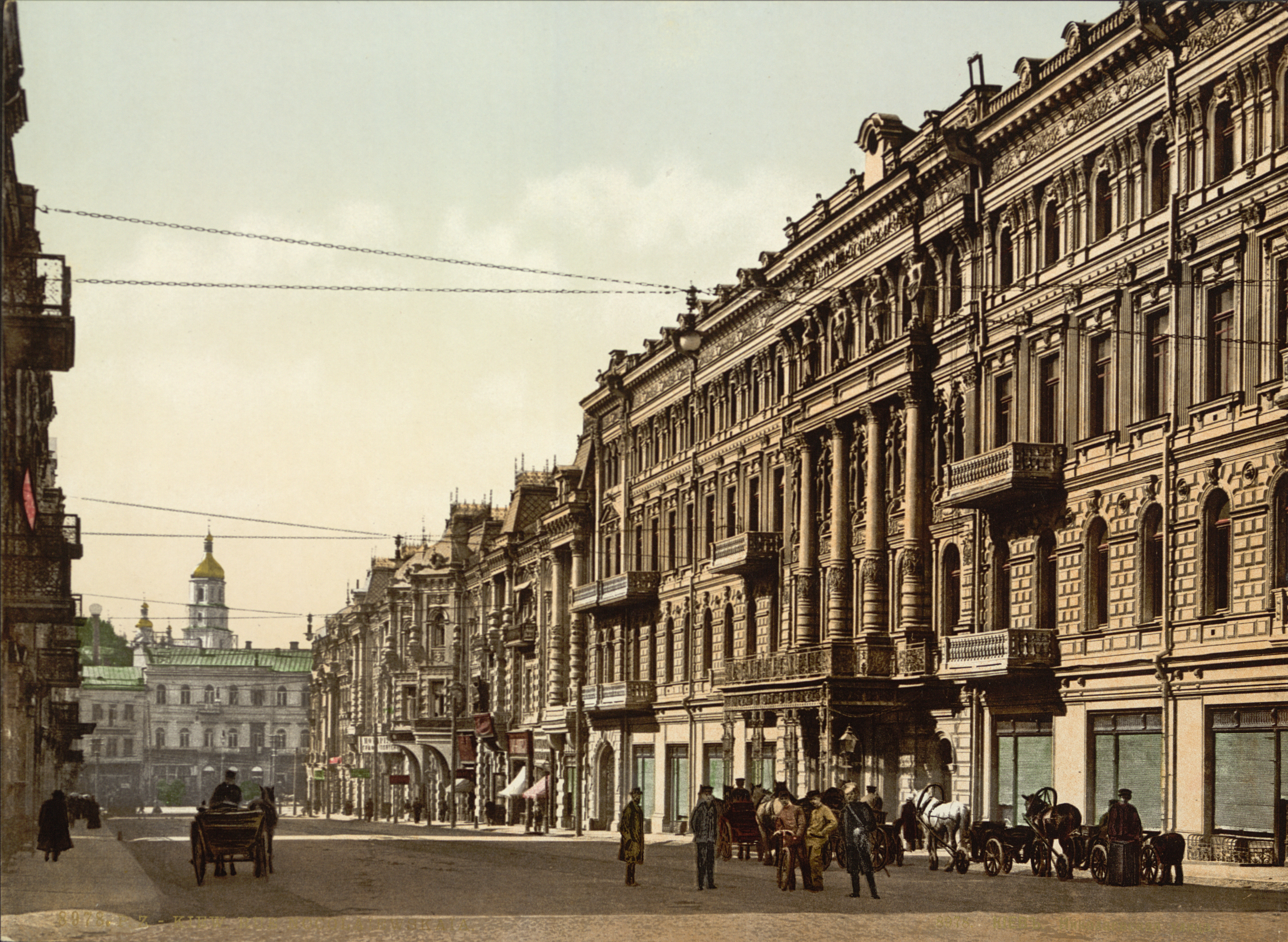
Kyiv at the turn of the 19th and 20th centuries

=== 1900s-1940s ===
- 1901 - Kyiv Opera House opens.
- 1902
  - People's Palace and Synagogue of the Karaites built.
  - Population: 319,000.
- 1905
  - October: Pogrom against Jews.
  - 12–16 December: Shuliavka Republic.
  - Kyiv Funicular begins operating.
- 1906 - Ipolit Dyakov becomes the city's governor.
- 1909
  - Kyiv Zoo opens.
  - St. Nicholas Roman Catholic Cathedral built.

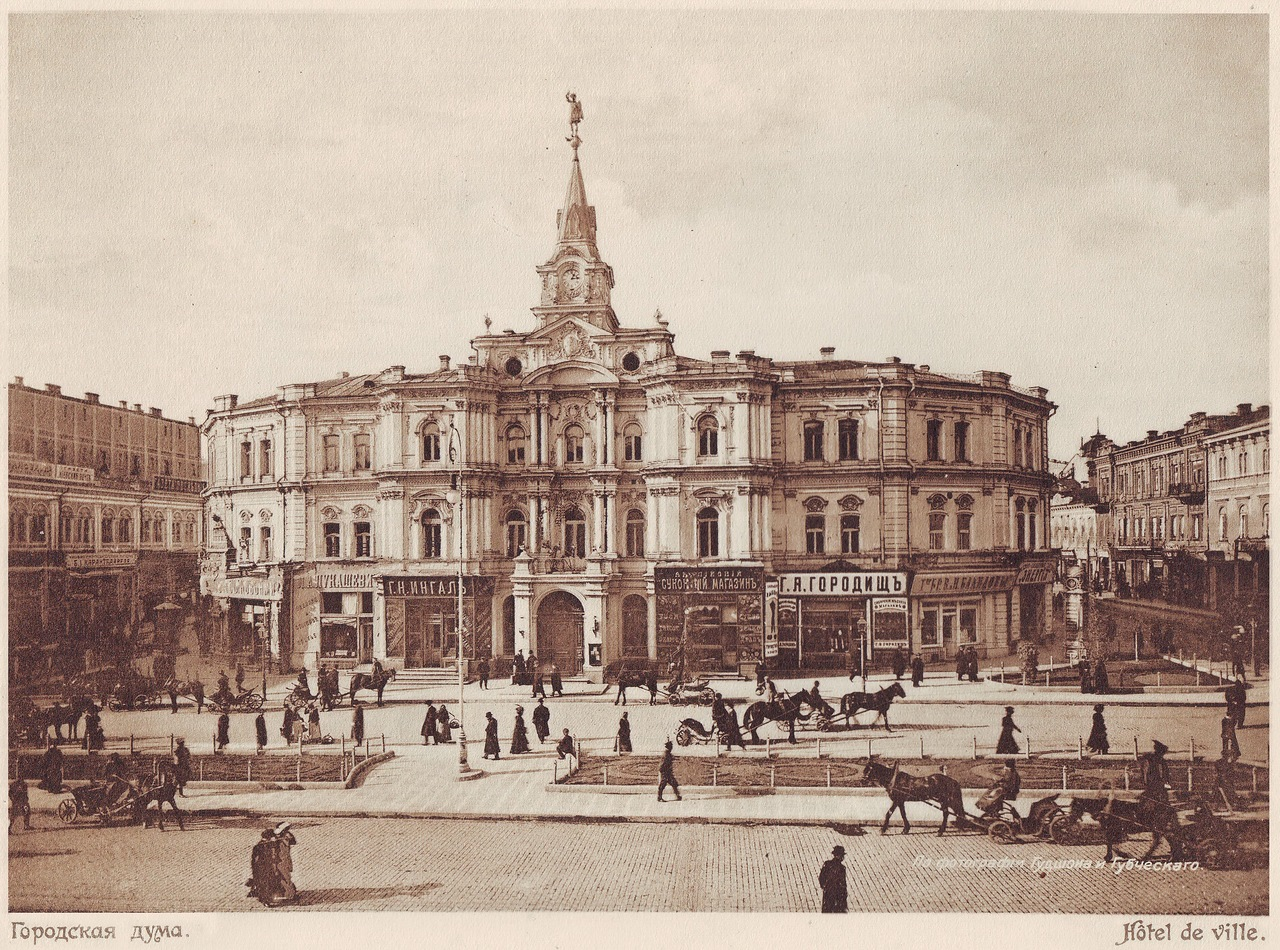
City Hall in 1911

- 1911
  - The National Library of Ukraine is built.
  - September: Assassination of Pyotr Stolypin.
- 1912
  - Besarabsky Market, Museum of Pedagogy, and St. Panteleimon's Cathedral built.
  - Sports Ground opens.
- 1913
  - Kyiv Conservatory founded.
  - All-Russian (Imperial) Olympiad held.
  - Beilis affair.
  - Population: 610,190.
- 1917
  - 17 March: Central Rada established.
  - 17 July: Polubotkivtsi Uprising.
  - 7 November: Kyiv becomes the capital of the Ukrainian People's Republic.
  - 8–13 November: Kyiv Bolshevik Uprising.
  - Population: 640,000.
- 1918
  - 29 January-4 February: Kyiv Arsenal January Uprising.
  - 1 March–December: German occupation.
  - National Library of Ukraine established.
- 1919
  - 5 February: City captured by the Soviet Red Army.
  - 31 August: City captured by the Russian White Army.
  - 16 December: City captured by the Soviet Red Army.

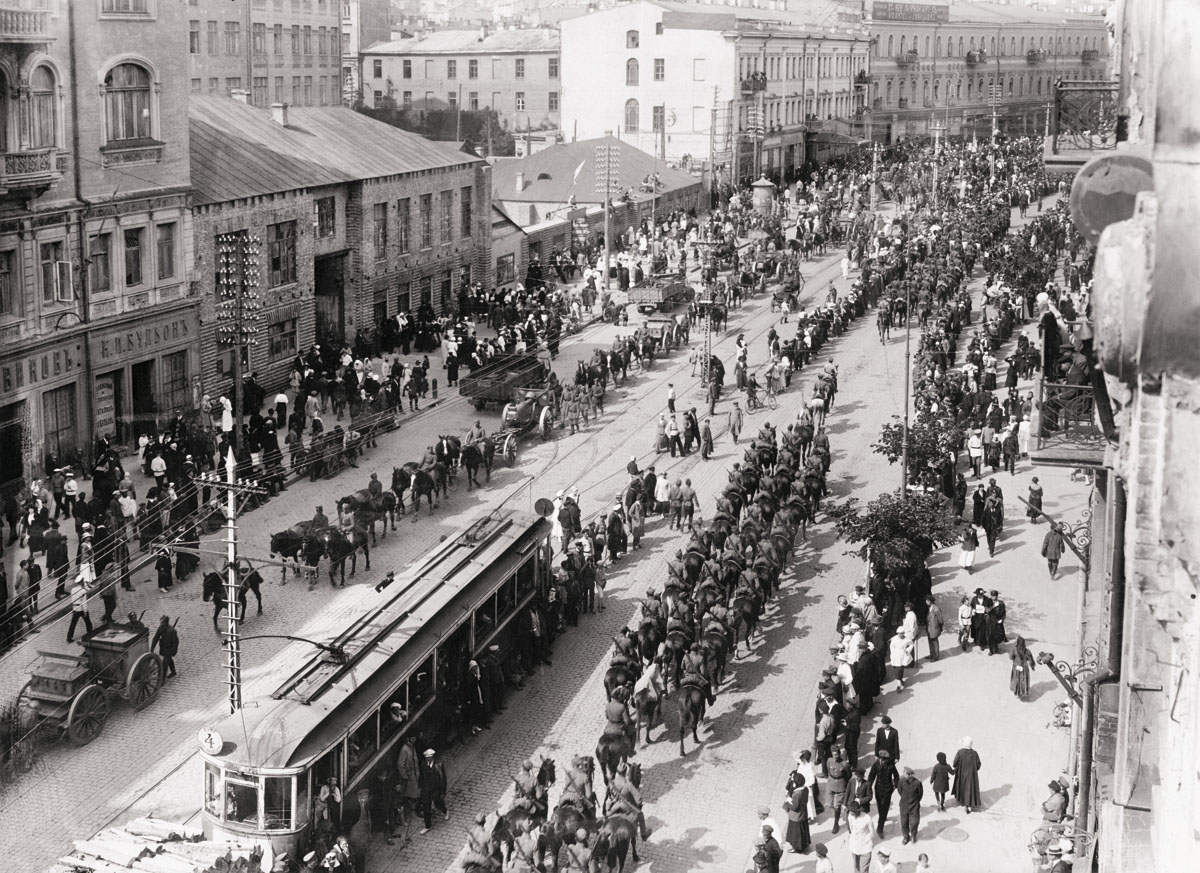
Polish-Ukrainian military parade in 1920

- 1920
  - 7 May: City captured by joint Polish-Ukrainian forces during the Kyiv offensive, part of the Polish–Soviet War.
  - 9 May: Kyiv Victory Parade, a joint Polish-Ukrainian military parade in the liberated city.
  - City captured by the Red Army.
- 1922
  - 30 December: Ukrainian Socialist Soviet Republic becomes part of the Soviet Union.
- 1923
  - Trotsky Red Stadium opens.
  - Darnytsia, Lanky, Chokolivka, and Nikolska slobidka become part of Kyiv.
- 1924 - Zhuliany Airport in operation.
- 1925 - Consulate of Poland established.
- 1926 - National Academic Theater of Russian Drama founded.
- 1927
  - Dovzhenko Film Studios founded.
  - Kyiv Fortress museum and Kyiv Academic Puppet Theatre established.

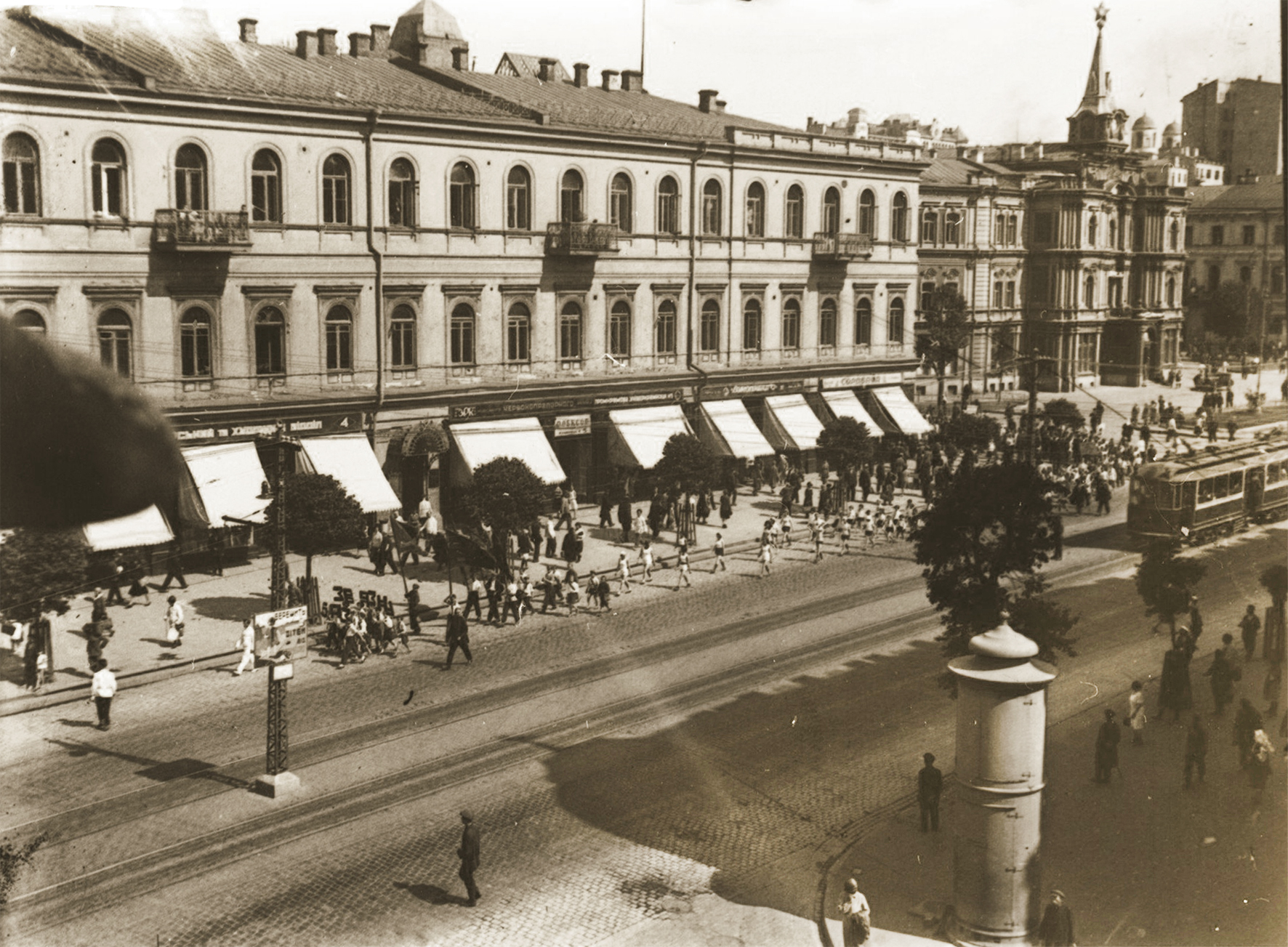
Khreshchatyk in 1930

- 1932
  - City designated administrative center of Kyiv Oblast.
  - Central Railway Station built.
  - Holodomor begins.
- 1933 - Kyiv Aviation Institute organized.
- 1934
  - Capital of Ukrainian Socialist Soviet Republic relocates to Kyiv from Kharkiv.
  - Vsevolod Balitsky Dynamo Stadium built.
  - Kyiv National Academic Theatre of Operetta founded.
  - Demolition of St. Michael's Golden-Domed Monastery begins.
- 1935 - Demolition of Fountain of Samson.
- 1936 - National Botanical Garden founded.
- 1939 - Staff of the Consulate of Poland in Kyiv arrested by the Soviets following the Soviet invasion of Poland at the start of World War II.
- 1940 - Soviet executions of Polish officers and intelligentsia during the Katyn massacre.

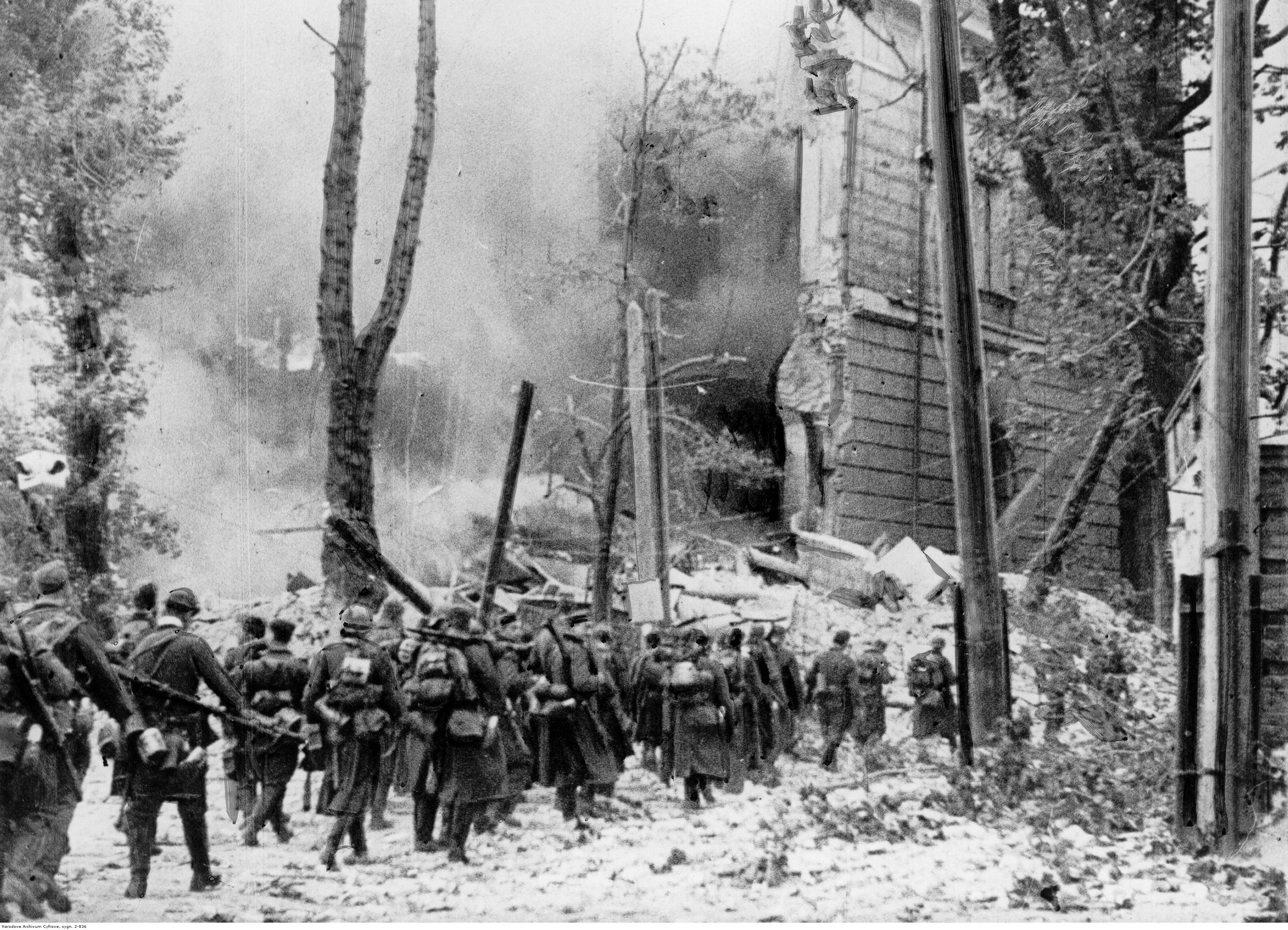
German troops entering Kyiv in 1941

- 1941
  - 22 June: German invasion of the Soviet Union starts, with Kyiv bombed.
  - 23 August: Battle of Kyiv begins.
  - 19 September: Occupation by forces of Nazi Germany begins.
  - 29–30 September: Babi Yar massacre.
  - Nazi prison established by the Sicherheitsdienst.
- 1942
  - January: Stalag 339 prisoner-of-war camp established by the Germans.
  - April: Kyiv Archive Museum of Transitional Period active.
- 1943
  - February: Stalag 339 camp dissolved.
  - Battle of Kyiv.
  - 6 November: City recaptured by Soviet Army, ending the German occupation.
- 1945 - 4-7 September: An anti-semitic pogrom occurred, with approximately one hundred Jews beaten, of whom thirty-six were hospitalized and five died of wounds.

=== 1950s-1990s ===
- 1952 - Kyiv Planetarium opens.
- 1953 - Paton Bridge built.
- 1957 - Trukhaniv Island pedestrian bridge constructed.
- 1958 - Exhibition of Achievements of the National Economy of Ukrainian SSR opens.
- 1959 - Kyiv-Tsentralnyi airport begins operating.
- 1960
  - Kyiv Metro begins operating.
  - Palace of Sports opens.
  - Population: 846,293.
- 1961
  - 13 March: Kurenivka mudslide.
  - Kyiv River Port passenger terminal and Hotel Moscow built.
- 1965
  - Kyiv Metro Bridge built.
  - Population: 1,332,000.
- 1967 - State Library of Ukraine for Children founded.
- 1968 - Hydropark opens.
- 1972 - Feofaniya becomes a park.
- 1973 - Kyiv TV Tower constructed.
- 1975 - FC Dynamo Kyiv wins the UEFA Winners' Cup and becomes the first Soviet team to earn the cup.
- 1976 - Moskovskyi Bridge built.
- 1978 - Kyiv Light Rail begins operating.
- 1979
  - Kyiv National Academic Theatre of Drama and Comedy and Kyiv Academic Youth Theatre founded.
  - Population: 2,248,000.
- 1981
  - Museum of the Great Patriotic War established.
  - Mother Motherland statue erected.
  - Fountain of Samson rebuilt.
- 1982
  - All-Union Lenin Museum built.
  - Golden Gate rebuilt.
- 1983 - Kyiv Academic Theatre of Ukrainian Folklore founded.
- 1985
  - Kyiv Municipal Academic Opera and Ballet Theatre for Children and Youth founded.
  - Population: 2,448,000.
- 1986 - 26 April: Chernobyl disaster.
- 1990
  - The Pivdennyi Bridge is built.
  - October: Student anti-government protests.

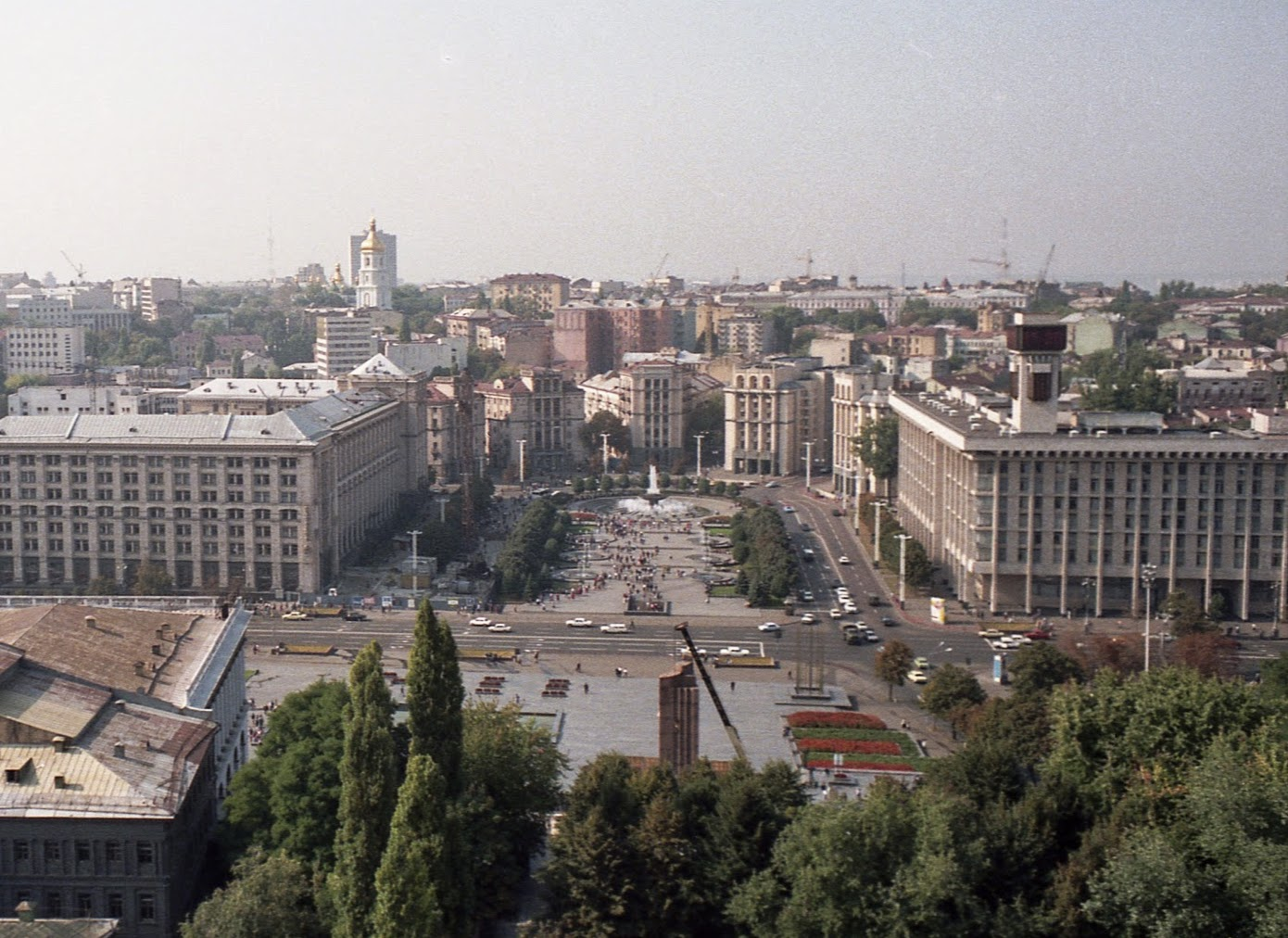
City centre in 1991

- 1991
  - Kyiv becomes the capital of independent Ukraine.
  - The Mikhail Bulgakov Museum opens.
- 1992 - The Chernobyl Museum organized.
- 1993 - Podilsko-Voskresensky Bridge construction begins.
- 1994
  - Leonid Kosakivsky becomes mayor.
  - Bykivnia memorial opens.
- 1997
  - Leonid Kosakivsky becomes mayor.
  - Trinity Cathedral is built.
- 1998 - The Polish Institute in Kyiv is established.
- 1999
  - Oleksandr Omelchenko becomes mayor.
  - St. Michael's Golden-Domed Monastery is rebuilt.
- 2000 - Ukraine without Kuchma protests begin.

== 21st century ==
=== 2000s ===
- 2001
  - 9 March: Ukraine without Kuchma end.
  - The city undergoes redistricting.
- 2002 - Obolon Arena opens.
- 2003 - The Ukraine State Aviation Museum opens.
- 2004
  - April: City hosts the 2004 European Weightlifting Championships.
  - June: City hosts the 2004 European Rhythmic Gymnastics Championships.
  - November: Orange Revolution protests begin.
- 2005 - City hosts Eurovision Song Contest.
- 2006
  - Leonid Chernovetskyi becomes mayor.
  - PinchukArtCentre and Kyiv in Miniature open.
  - The House of Football is inaugurated.
- 2007 - City hosts the 2007 World Orienteering Championships.
- 2008 - City hosts the 2008 European Fencing Championships.
- 2009 - City hosts the Junior Eurovision Song Contest 2009.

=== 2010s ===
- 2010
  - Kyiv Urban Electric Train begins operating.
  - Population: 2,797,553.
- 2011 - The New Darnytskyi Bridge and Patriarchal Cathedral of the Resurrection of Christ open.
- 2012 -
  - The UEFA Euro 2012 final is held in the city.
  - July: Protest against language policy in Ukraine.
- 2013
  - May: Rise up protest.
  - 21 November: Euromaidan protests begin.
  - City hosts the Junior Eurovision Song Contest 2013.
- 2014
  - Hrushevskoho Street riots.
  - Vitali Klitschko becomes mayor.

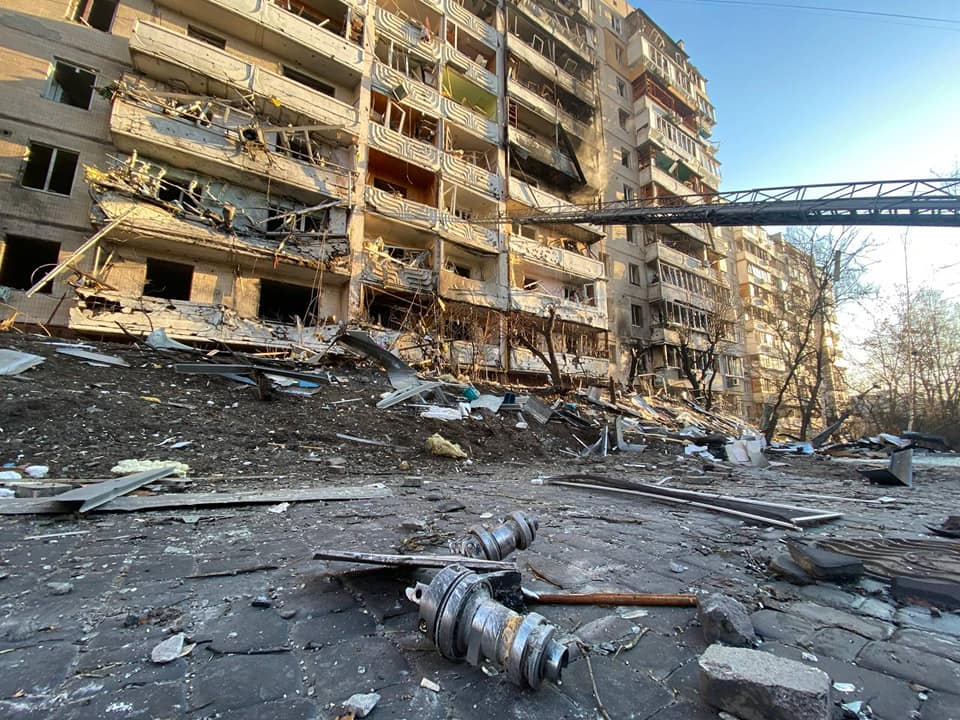
War damages after Russian shelling in 2022

- 2015 - Population: 2,890,432.
- 2017
  - May: Eurovision Song Contest 2017 held.
  - 27 June: Cyberattacks affect some Kyiv entities.
- 2017 - 13 October: City council renames 39 streets, among them Kuchmyn Yar Street.
- 2018 - Population: 2,893,215 (estimate).
- 2019 - The 2019 European Diving Championships is held in the city.

=== 2020s ===
- 2020 - The 2020 Rhythmic Gymnastics European Championships is hosted in the city.
- 2021 - The 2021 European Badminton Championships is held in the city.
- 2022
  - 24 February: Kyiv comes under attack by Russian forces during the Russian invasion of Ukraine.
  - 10 October: October 2022 Kyiv missile strikes.

== See also ==
- History of Kyiv
- List of mayors of Kyiv
- Pale of Settlement

== Bibliography ==
Published in the 19th century

- Mary Holderness (1823), "Kiev", New Russia: Journey from Riga to the Crimea, by way of Kiev, London: Printed for Sherwood, Jones and Co., OCLC 5073195
- David Brewster (1830), "Kiof", Edinburgh Encyclopaedia, Edinburgh: Printed for William Blackwood
- Josiah Conder (1830), "Kiev", Russia, The Modern Traveller, vol. 17, London: J.Duncan
- "Kief". Hand-book for Travellers in Russia, Poland, and Finland (2nd ed.). London: John Murray. 1868.

Published in the 20th century

- Annette M. B. Meakin (1906). "Kieff". Russia, Travels and Studies. London: Hurst and Blackett. OCLC 3664651.
- "Kiev", Jewish Encyclopedia, vol. 7, New York, 1907, hdl:2027/osu.32435029752888
- Kropotkin, Peter Alexeivitch; Bealby, John Thomas (1910). "Kiev (city)" . Encyclopædia Britannica. Vol. 15 (11th ed.). pp. 789–790.
- Ruth Kedzie Wood (1912). "Kiev". The Tourist's Russia. New York: Dodd, Mead and Company. OCLC 526774.
- Nevin O. Winter (1913). "Little Russia". The Russian Empire of To-day and Yesterday. Boston: L.C. Page.
- "Kiev". Russia with Teheran, Port Arthur, and Peking. Leipzig: Karl Baedeker. 1914. OCLC 1328163.
- Basil Shulgin (1939–1940). "Kiev, Mother of Russian Towns". Slavonic and East European Review. 19.
- Johan Callmerr (1987). "Archaeology of Kiev to the End of the Earliest Urban Phase". Harvard Ukrainian Studies. 11 (3/4): 323–364. JSTOR 41036279.

Published in the 21st century

- Katchanovski, Ivan; Kohut, Zenon E.; Nesebio, Bohdan Y.; Yurkevich, Myroslav (2013). Historical Dictionary of Ukraine. Lanham, Maryland; Toronto; Plymouth: Scarecrow Press. p. 992. ISBN 9780810878471.
- Magocsi, Paul Robert (2010). A History of Ukraine: The Land and Its Peoples. Toronto: University of Toronto Press. p. 894. ISBN 9781442610217.
