= Mayor of Kyiv =

Head of the executive branch of the Government of Kyiv, Ukraine

Mayor of Kyiv City
- Київський міський голова
- Coat of arms of Kyiv

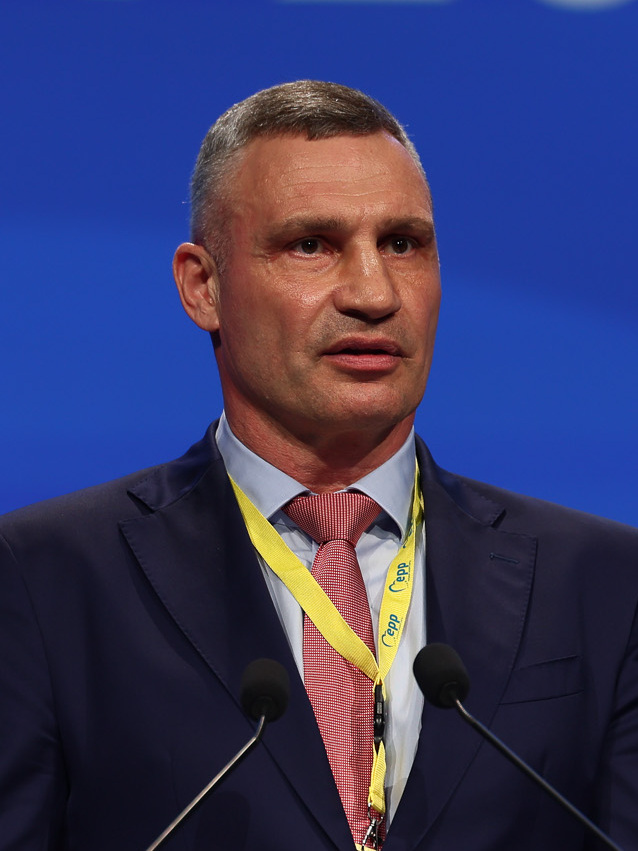
- Incumbent; Vitali Klitschko since 5 June 2014
- Appointer: Popular vote
- Term length: 4 years
- Inaugural holder: Leonid Kosakivsky
- Formation: 1997
- Website: kmr.gov.ua

The Head of Kyiv City (Ukrainian: Київський міський голова, romanized: Kyivskyi miskyi holova), unofficially and more commonly the Mayor of Kyiv (Ukrainian: Мер Києва, romanized: Mer Kyieva), is a city official elected by popular vote who serves as a head of the City State Administration of Kyiv (the capital of Ukraine) and a chairperson the Kyiv City Council.

The mayor is elected for the term of four years. Current mayor Vitali Klitschko was sworn in on 5 June 2014. Klitschko was last reelected in the 2020 Kyiv local election with 50.52% of the votes, in the first round of the election.

== Elections of mayor of Kyiv ==
In March 1990, Kyiv's "First Truly Democratic" elections were announced (see Demokratizatsiya, part of Soviet Perestroika). Dmytro Tabachnyk (ran as the Communist party candidate) and Mikhail Pogrebinsky (ran as an unaffiliated candidate) in an interview with Segodnya claimed that they were truly the most honest elections. The elections took place alongside the 1990 Ukrainian Supreme Soviet election.

Following the political crisis of 1993–94, snap elections were held for to elect the country's president and parliament, as well as local elections.

In 2006, according to the Kyiv City Electoral Commission, Leonid Chernovetskyi won 31.83% of the popular vote, Vitali Klitschko placed second with 23.7%, and incumbent Oleksandr Omelchenko placed third with 21.2%.

As of December 2006, Chernovetskyi's rating had decreased to 8%. This was mostly due to his betrayal of those who elected him, most notably through his increasing of the price of household services (such as water and gas) by 340%.

However, Chernovetskyi won a second term as Mayor of Kyiv with 38% of the vote in the 25 May 2008 snap local election, called by the Verkhovna Rada in March. From the resignation of Chernovetskyi in July 2012 until fresh elections in 2014, Kyiv City Council Secretary and Deputy Mayor Halyna Hereha was the acting Mayor of Kyiv.

In the 2014 Kyiv local election, Vitali Klitschko was elected as mayor of Kyiv with almost 57% of the votes. Klitschko was sworn in as mayor on 5 June 2014.

The 2015 Kyiv local election (including mayoral elections) took place on 25 October 2015. A second round of mayoral elections was held on 15 November 2015 between Klitschko and Boryslav Bereza after incumbent Mayor Klitschko scored 40.5% of the vote and Bereza 8.8% in the first round. Klitschko won the second round with 66.5%; Bereza gained 33.51% of the votes.

The 2020 Kyiv local election (including mayoral elections) took place on 25 October 2020. Incumbent Mayor Klitschko won the election with 50.52% of the votes, in the first round of the election. None of the other candidates had more than 10% of the vote.

== Dualism of authority in Kyiv ==
An October 2010 Presidential decree relieved then-mayor of Kyiv Leonid Chernovetskyi of the office of Head of Kyiv City Administration, while still preserving the post of mayor. This led to Chernovetskyi being deprived of his official decision-making role and most power in the capital was handed over to the Head of Kyiv City Administration. At the time that was Oleksandr Popov, who was appointed by President Viktor Yanukovych on 16 November 2010. Before these amendments, the elected mayor of the Kyiv City Council was automatically appointed also as head of the Kyiv City Administration.

Chernovetskyi was not seen in Kyiv for several months after Popov's appointment, but returned to the public eye in early 2011. By that time, Chernovetskyi had become extremely unpopular among the residents of Kyiv.

Chernovetskyi tendered his resignation on 1 June 2012. The city council decided on 12 July 2012 that Halyna Hereha would temporarily act as the mayor of the capital city. A petition to the Ukrainian Parliament on holding an early mayoral election in the city was sent (the dates of the early mayoral elections are set by Ukraine's parliament). New elections were held in 2014; Vitali Klitschko was elected as mayor of Kyiv with almost 57% of the votes.

After 25 June 2014 the post of mayor of Kyiv and Head of Kyiv City Administration were being held by a single person again after Vitali Klitschko, who had been sworn in as mayor on 5 June 2014, was appointed Head of Kyiv City Administration by Ukrainian President Petro Poroshenko. However, on 1 March 2022, during the Russian invasion of Ukraine, President Volodymyr Zelenskyy introduced a military administration in Kyiv, appointing major general Mykola Zhyrnov as wartime head of the city authority. On 21 October 2022 Zhyrnov was replaced on his post by colonel general Serhiy Popko. Mayor Klitschko continues to execute his functions as head of Kyiv's civilian authority and is also part of the city's Defense Council.

== List ==
The following is a list of mayors of the city of Kyiv. It includes positions equivalent to mayor, such as chairperson of the city council executive committee.

=== Wójt (head of city government) ===
==== Grand Duchy of Lithuania ====
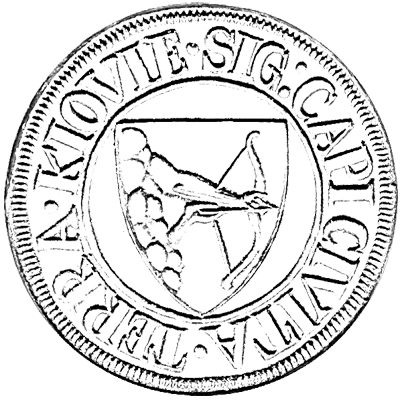
Seal of Kyiv City Magistrate, 1550

- Zanko (Hanko) Onkovych, c.1498/1502-1514
- Jan, c.1514-c.1528
- Ivan Cherevchey, 1528-1540
- Jan Dkhorevs'kyj, c.1544-1548
- Semen Meleshkovych, 1548-1550
- Maksym Khonych, 1550-1555
- Semen Meleshkovych, 1555/1558-1563 (2nd term)
- Bohush Lenkevych of Kotwicz coat of arms, 1563-1564
- Yurii Klymovych, 1565-1566
- Vasyl Cherevchey, 1566-1567
- Stanislav Sokolovs'kyj, 1568-1570

==== Kingdom of Poland ====
- Ustym Fits-Kobyzevych of Masalski coat of arms, 1569 (acting)
- Havrylo Roj, 1570-1575
- Semen Konashkovych, 1575 (acting)
- Fedir Cherevchey, 1576-1581
- Semen Konashkovych, 1581-1587
- Fedir Vovk, 1587-1592/1593
- Erazm Strawinski of Sulima coat of arms, 1593
- Yatsko Balyka of Abdank coat of arms, 1593-1612
- Fedir Khodyka-Kobyzevych of Masalski coat of arms, 1613-1625
- Artem Konashkovych, 1625-1628
- Sozon Balyka, 1628-1629
- Ivan Yevseyovych, 1629-1631
- Stefan Kryvkovych, 1631-1632
- Yosyf Khodyka, 1633-1641
- Samiylo (Samuel) Mefedovych, 1641-1644
- Andrii (Andrzej) Khodyka, 1644-1649

==== Cossack Hetmanate ====
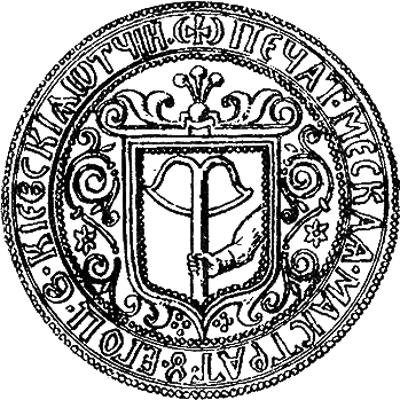
Seal of Kyiv Magistrate, 1671-1700

- Bohdan Somkovych, 1649-1651
- Andrzej Khodyka, 1651 (restoration of Polish rule by Janusz Radziwiłł)
- Bohdan Somkovych, 1653-1660
- Danilo Polotsky, 1660-1675
- Fedir-Zhdan Tadryna, 1675-1677
- Zhdan Tadryna, 1677-1687
- Jan Bykovsky, 1687-1699
- Fedor Bykovsky, 1699
- Dmytro Polotsky, 1699-1733

==== Russian Empire (as part of Kiev Governorate) ====
- Kuzma Krychevyts, 1733–1734
- Pavlo Voynich, 1734-1751
- Ivan Sychevsky, 1753-1766
- Hryhoriy Pyvovarov, 1766-1781
- Yakiv Davydovsky, 1781-1785
- Vasyl Kopystensky, 1785-1787 (head of city duma)
- Yuhym Mytyuk, 1787-1790 (head of city duma)
- Hryhoriy Radzytsky, 1790-1801 (head of city duma until the restoration of Magdeburg Law in 1798)
- Heorhiy Rybalsky, 1801-1813
- Philip Lakerda, 1813-1814
- Mykhailo Hryhorenko, 1815-1826
- Hryhoriy Kyselivsky, 1826-1834

=== Mayors (heads of the city) ===
==== Russian Empire ====
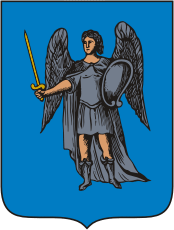
Coat of arms of Kiev Governorate (1782)

- Parthenius Dechterev, 1835-1837
- Pavel Yeliseyev, 1837-1838
- Ivan Khodunov, 1838-1841
- Gottlieb Finke, 1841-1844
- Ivan Khodunov, 1844-1847
- Mykola Balabukha, 1847-1851
- Ivan Khodunov, 1851-1853
- Semen Lychkov, 1853-1854
- Andriy Bukhteev, 1854-1857
- Hryhoriy Pokrovsky, 1857-1860
- Yosyp Zavadsky, 1860-1863
- Fedir Voitenko, 1863-1871
- Pavlo Demidov San Donato, 1871–1872, 1873-1874
- Gustav Eisman, 1872-1873
- Mykola Rennenkampf, 1875-1879
- Gustav Eisman, 1879-1884
- Ivan Tolli, 1884-1887
- Stepan Solsky, 1887-1900
- Vasyl Protsenko, 1900-1906
- Ipolyt Dyakov, 1906-1916
- Fedir Burchak, 1916-1917

==== Ukrainian People's Republic ====
- Yevhen Ryabtsov, 1917-1918
- Ipolyt Dyakov, 1918
- Yevhen Ryabtsov, 1918-1919
- Petro Butenko, 1919
- Mykola Litvytskyi, 1920 (military commissar)

==== Ukrainian Soviet Socialist Republic ====
- Hryhoriy Chudnovsky, 1918 (civil commissar)
- Andrei Bubnov, 1919 (head of City Executive Council)
- Andriy Ivanov, 1919-1920 (head of Kyiv Governorate Revolutionary Committee)
- Mykhailo Vetoshkin, 1920 (head of Kyiv Governorate Revolutionary Committee)
- Yan Gamarnik, 1920-1923 (until 1921 - head of Kyiv Governorate Revolutionary Committee, after 1921 - head of Kyiv City Council)
- Hryhoriy Hrynko, 1923-1925
- Panteleimon Svistun, 1925
- Panas Lyubchenko, 1925-1927
- Yuriy Voitsekhivsky, 1928-1932
- Ivan Vorobyov, 1932
- Vasyl Bystrukov, 1932-1934
- Raphael Petrushansky, 1934-1937
- Pavlo Khrystych, 1937
- Taras Mitulynsky, 1937 (acting head of city council)
- Mykola Pashko, 1937-1938 (acting)
- Ivan Shevtsov (mayor of Kyiv), 1938-1941

==== Reichskommissariat Ukraine (burgomasters) ====
- Oleksander Ohloblyn, 1941
- Volodymyr Bahaziy, 1941-1942
- Leontiy Forostivskyi, 1942-1943

==== Ukrainian Soviet Socialist Republic ====
Coat of Arms of Kyiv in 1969-1995

- Leonid Lebed, 1943-1944
- Fedir Mokienko, 1944-1946
- Fedor Chebotaryov, 1946-1947
- Oleksiy Davydov, 1947-1963
- Mykhailo Burka, 1963-1968
- Volodymyr Gusev, 1968-1979
- Valentyn Zghursky, 1979-1990
- Mykola Lavrukhin, 1990
- Hryhoriy Malyshevsky, 1990-1991

== Heads of local government in Kyiv since 1990 ==
=== Chairmen of the Kyiv City Council (1990–1999) ===
- 1990: Arnold Nazarchuk
- 1990–1991: Hryhoriy Malyshevsky
- 1991–1992: Oleksandr Mosyuk (acting)
- 1992–1994: Vasyl Nesterenko
- 1994–1997: Leonid Kosakivsky
- 1998–1999: Oleksandr Omelchenko

=== Heads of Kyiv City (Mayors of Kyiv) ===
- Independent
- Unity of Oleksandr Omelchenko
- Leonid Chernovetskyi Bloc
- Ukrainian Democratic Alliance for Reform (UDAR)

No.	Portrait	Mayor	Took office	Left office	Time in office	Party	Ref.
1	Leonid Kosakivsky	Leonid Kosakivsky (born 1950)	10 July 1994 (Note: Acting since 29 April 1993)	12 May 1998	3 years, 306 days	Independent	.
2	Oleksandr Omelchenko	Oleksandr Omelchenko (1938–2021)	30 May 1999	14 April 2006	6 years, 319 days	Unity of Oleksandr Omelchenko	.
3	Leonid Chernovetskyi	Leonid Chernovetskyi (born 1951)	14 April 2006	3 June 2012	6 years, 50 days	Leonid Chernovetskyi Bloc	
Acting	Halyna Hereha	Halyna Hereha (born 1959)	12 July 2012	5 June 2014	1 year, 328 days	Independent	
4	Vitali Klitschko	Vitali Klitschko (born 1971)	5 June 2014		12 years, 120 days	UDAR	

== Previous posts ==
- 1500 – 1835 Vogt of the city of Kyiv, official title was "Vijt" (Ukrainian: Війт) which is an adaptation of the Polish "Wojt"
  - Vogt was in charge of city magistrate. After the partition of Poland the post was transformed and the magistrate became a city court. In 1831 the Magdeburg town rights were abolished in the Russian Empire, except for Kyiv where they were discontinued in 1835 following a transitional period that began in 1781.
- 1835 – 1919 Head of the city of Kyiv (Russian Empire)
- 1919 – 1941 and 1943 - 1991 Chairperson of the Kyiv City Council (Soviet Union)
- 1941 – 1943 Burgomaster (Nazi Germany)
- 1990 – 1999 Chairperson of the Kyiv City Council
- since 1999 – Head of the City of Kyiv

== See also ==
- Kyiv City State Administration
- Kyiv City Council
- Timeline of Kyiv
