= Nikolai Obukhov =

Russian composer

Nikolai Borisovich Obukhov
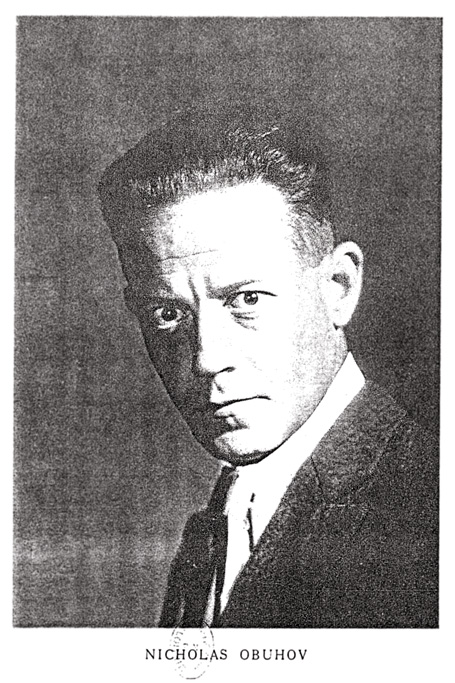
- Nikolai Borisovich Obukhov
- Born: 22 April [O.S. 10 April] 1892; Olshanka village, Kursk Governorate, Russian Empire (now Chernyansky District, Belgorod Oblast, Russia)
- Died: 13 June 1954 (aged 62); Saint-Cloud, Paris, France
- Occupation: composer

Nikolai Borisovich Obukhov (Russian: Николай Борисович Обухов; Nicolai, Nicolas, Nikolay; Obukhow, Obouhow, Obouhov, Obouhoff) (22 April 1892 – 13 June 1954) was a modernist and mystic Russian composer, active mainly in France. An avant-garde figure who took as his point of departure the late music of Scriabin, he fled Russia along with his family after the Bolshevik Revolution, settling in Paris. His music is notable for its religious mysticism, its unusual notation, its use of an idiosyncratic 12-tone chromatic language, and its pioneering use of electronic musical instruments in the era of their earliest development.

== Life ==
=== Russia ===
Obukhov was born in Ol'shanka, in Kursk Governorate, Russia, about 80 km south-southeast of the city of Kursk. When he was still a child, his family moved to Moscow. They were attentive to his musical development, having him taught piano and violin from an early age. In 1911 he began studies at the Moscow Conservatory, and he continued at the Saint Petersburg Conservatory from 1913 to 1916, where his teachers included Maximilian Steinberg and Nikolai Tcherepnin. In 1913 Obukhov married Xenia Komarovskaya; they had two sons before they left Russia.

His early music, composed after 1910, attracted sufficient attention to inspire the periodical Muzykal'niy Sovremennik to organize a concert of his compositions in 1915, and another in Saint Petersburg in 1916, in which all the music performed used a new method of music notation he had developed the preceding year. In 1918 he fled Russia with his wife and two children to escape the hardships following the Bolshevik Revolution and ensuing civil war; after a period of travel in the Crimea, by way of Constantinople they settled in Paris, a common destination for artistic and intellectual refugees due to traditional cultural ties between the two nations.

=== Move to France ===
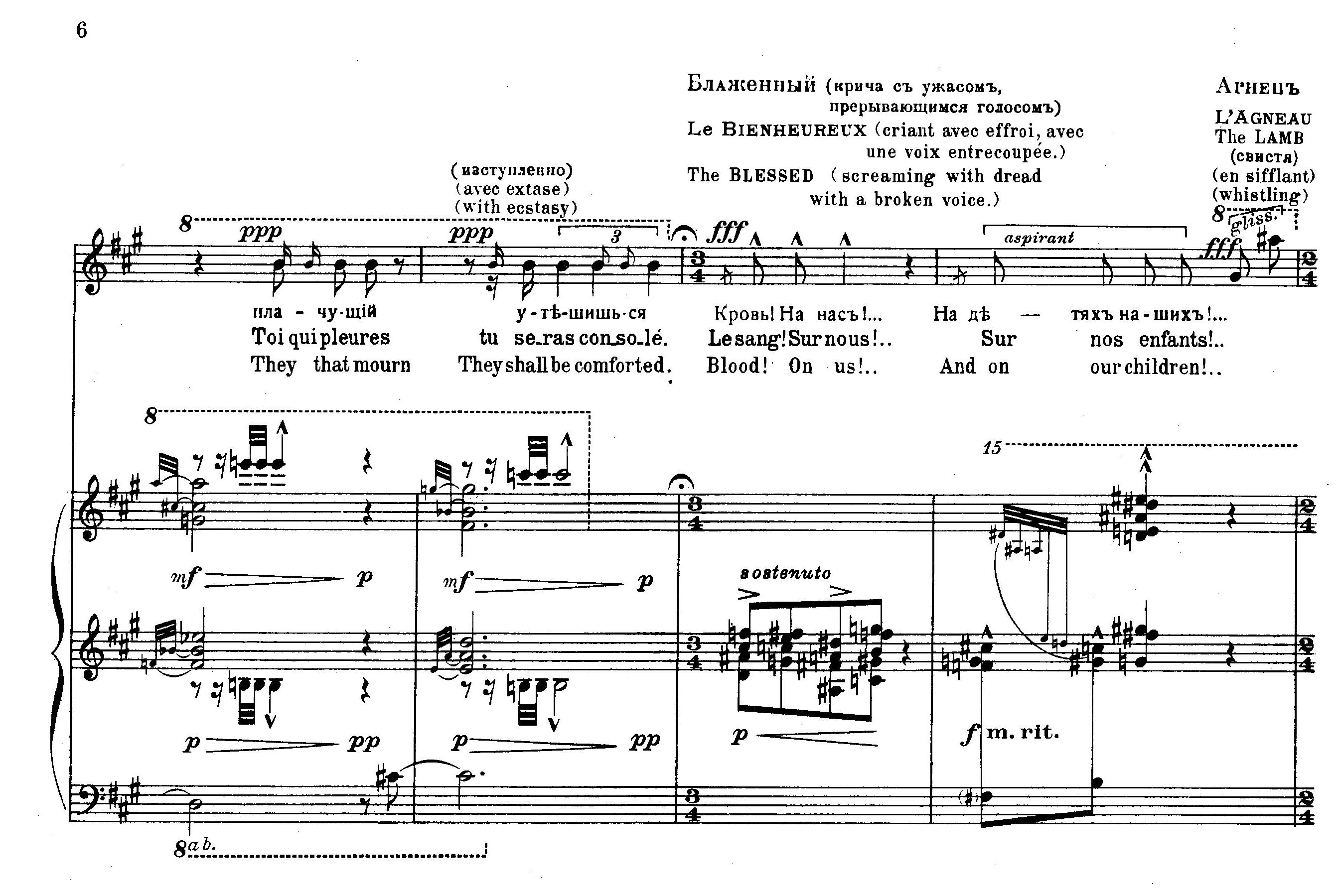
Extract of Obukhov's song Berceuse d'un bienheureux au chevet d'un morte showing characteristic performance directions. This was one of Obukhov's first publications after he moved to France.

In France Obukhov met and studied with Maurice Ravel, who not only showed some interest in his music but provided financial assistance for the refugee family and set Obukhov up with a publisher. While he at first lived in poverty, he was able to obtain sufficient outside help to be able to focus on composition and associated projects. These projects included the development of an electronic instrument, the croix sonore, a device similar to the theremin but built in the shape of a cross, with the electronics hidden inside a brass orb to which the cross was affixed. He worked with Pierre Dauvillier and Michel Billaudot on the construction of the device, probably at different times. They demonstrated a prototype of the croix sonore in 1926, withdrawing it to create a refined version in 1934; many of Obukhov's concurrent and subsequent works use the instrument.

In 1926 Serge Koussevitzky, always a proponent of new music, particularly that of experimental Russian composers – he was long a champion of Scriabin and Stravinsky – became interested in Obukhov's massive (and incomplete) magnum opus, the liturgical cantata Kniga Zhizni (The Book of Life), and conducted a performance of its Prologue in Paris.

Obukhov remained in Paris, living in a small apartment with his wife, composing and writing about his harmonic and notational system. Physically robust, he made a living as a bricklayer. One of his students, the pianist Countess Marie-Antoinette Aussenac-Broglie, intrigued by his mystical religious world-view as well as his music, mastered the art of playing the croix sonore. She became one of the most vigorous proponents both of Obukhov's music and of his unusual electronic instrument, and she also provided him with a house and financial support. Arthur Honegger was one of several composers who published music using his notation, and in 1943 the publisher Durand printed a group of pieces by different composers – from the 18th through the 20th centuries – using this notation. While Obhukov's compositional activity was partially interrupted by the Second World War, he published his treatise on harmony and notation in 1947, Traité d'harmonie tonale, atonale et totale. Honegger wrote the foreword to the book.

In 1949 he was attacked and mugged by a gang of thugs and injured so severely that he virtually ceased to compose for the remainder of his life. The attackers made off with a portfolio of manuscripts, including the definitive copy of his Book of Life. Rendered an invalid by the attack, he lived another five years, dying in Saint-Cloud, in the western suburbs of Paris. He is buried in the Cimetière de Saint-Cloud; atop his ruined monument was once a stone replica of his croix sonore, placed there by Marie-Antoinette Aussenac-Broglie.

His numerous manuscripts are kept in the Bibliothèque nationale de France in Paris. Only a few have been published. Larry Sitsky, in his 1994 Music of the repressed Russian avant-garde, 1900–1929, includes a complete alphabetical listing of the composer's works from that archive.

== Works ==
=== Overview ===
While Obukhov is most notorious for his gargantuan The Book of Life, he also wrote numerous miniatures, several of which have been published. His output includes works for piano; songs for voice and piano; works for electronic instrument and piano, usually the croix sonore or sometimes the ondes Martenot; chamber works for combinations of voices, instruments, and Obukhov's invented instruments; works for orchestra; and enormous oratorios or cantatas for voices, croix sonore, piano, organ, and orchestra. Most of his works include parts for a piano, and the croix sonore figures prominently in his output.

Obhukov's music was experimental and innovative from the start, with similarities to the tonal and harmonic language of Scriabin in his early work. Other early influences were the writings of philosopher Vladimir Solovyov and the mystical, apocalyptic poetry of Konstantin Balmont, whose verse he set to music. Obukhov evolved a technique of using all twelve tones, not in rows as Schoenberg was developing in Vienna, but as defining harmonic areas or regions through twelve-tone chords. This was one of the first, if not the first attempt to develop a dodecaphonic compositional method, predating Schoenberg's by several years. Additionally, he developed a scheme for non-repetition of tones until the other eleven had sounded, along with a similar method of controlling intervals. Obukhov was one of several composers at the time working on 12-tone methods; others in Russia included Roslavets, Lourié and Golyshev.

In addition to the novelty of his 12-tone method, Obukhov was also one of the first composers to require singers to make sounds other than singing, including shouts, screams, whispers, whistles, and groans. An important part of his aesthetic was the idea of religious ecstasy expressed through sound, and later through the other senses. His early songs, composed in Russia, include unusual directions to the singers. The Berceuse d'un bienheureux au chevet d'un morte ("Berceuse of a blessed one at the bedside of the departed") (1918, published in 1921) includes, for detached short utterances, markings such as "suffering furiously", "whistling", "suffering, regretting with a harsh voice", "with an insane smile", "enthusiastically threatening", and "with malignancy".

=== Original notation ===
On 15 July 1915, according to the composer, he invented his new method of notation, which eliminated the need for accidentals by replacing noteheads with crosses for tones raised by one-half step. The symbol he used was similar to the standard symbol for the double sharp, except that it was used in place of a notehead. Only C, D, F, G, and A – the white keys on the piano with a black key adjacent to the right – could be replaced with a cross. In addition to his notehead symbol, Obukhov employed a symbol similar to a Maltese Cross to indicate barlines in his scores, and he often placed these divisions at phrase boundaries, resulting in bars of enormous length. The crosses, both in the noteheads and at the phrase divisions, were symbolic of the crucifix, and Obhukov often inserted tempo markings and rehearsal numbers in his manuscripts in his own blood, as a symbol of Christ's sacrifice.

=== Original instruments ===
Obukhov invented three musical instruments: the "Ether", which was an electronically powered wind machine, which made an inaudible humming sound, allegedly both above and below the range of human hearing, intended to have a subliminal effect on the listener; the "Crystal", a keyboard instrument in which the hammers struck crystal hemispheres, producing a sound rather like a celesta; and the croix sonore, or "sonorous cross", an instrument similar to a theremin in which the pitch of the heterodyning oscillators is controlled by body capacitance – pitch would rise and fall depending on the position of the performer's arm with respect to the device. Unlike the theremin, the performer of the croix sonore controls volume with a simple knob rather than with her other arm. Of these three instruments, only the croix sonore is known to have been constructed, and he used it often, writing parts for it in more than 20 separate compositions.

The croix sonore consisted of a brass cross 175 cm high, planted on a globe 44 cm in diameter with a flattened base. The center of the cross contained a star, which was around chest-height for a standing performer. The electronics were inside the globe, with the cross acting as the antenna, so that the player's hand controlled pitch by moving towards and away from the star. The name of the instrument was engraved on the globe in Russian and French.

Performance on the croix sonore was a visual as well as an auditory experience. Obukhov intended the performer to be like a priestess performing a religious rite, and no public performance is known to have taken place in which the performer was male. A partial performance of the Book of Life in 1934 was reviewed by a New York Times critic in Paris:

In "Annunciation of the Last Judgement" the singers stood together, one gowned in white, the other in red, while Obouhoff and Arthur Schlossberg played two pianos, and Princess Marie Antoinette Aussenac de Broglie, apart and sacramentally gowned in black, blue and orange, drew from the croix sonore notes that throbbed like twenty violins or at times sang like a human voice.... Out of it, by moving the hand back and forth, the Princess de Broglie drew an amazing sweetness or the most dreadful note, like the knocking of fate ...

In October 1934, Germaine Dulac made a film of Aussenac de Broglie playing the instrument, with Obukhov at the piano. This took place in Italy with the assistance of the Institute of Rome.

After Obukhov's death, the instrument fell into disuse and then disrepair. For a time it was kept at the Bibliothèque-Musée de l’Opéra in Paris, where it could be seen until the early 1980s, but then it disappeared. One of the workers there came upon it by accident in 2009, and now the instrument – the only one known to have been constructed – is on display at the Musée de la musique.

=== The Book of Life ===
His largest composition, and the one to which he devoted attention for much of his early creative life, was his Kniga Zhizni (Le livre de vie, The Book of Life). According to Nicolas Slonimsky, writing in his autobiography Perfect Pitch, Obukhov's wife was so exasperated with her husband's obsessive activity on the massive and peculiar piece that once she attempted to destroy the score by cutting it up. The composer caught her in time, carefully and reverently suturing its wounds, and adding drops of his own blood where he repaired the torn pages. He kept it in a "sacred corner" of their Paris apartment, in a shrine upon which he placed candles to burn day and night, along with religious icons. Obukhov considered himself the intermediary rather than the composer of the piece – the person through whom the Divine allowed it to be revealed to the world – and he called that revelation a "sacred action" rather than a concert performance. Rather than using his full name, he signed this piece, as well as many others, as "Nicolas l'illuminé" (Nicolas the visionary). It was intended to be performed – or rather, revealed – once a year, during the day and the night, on the first and second resurrections of Christ, in a cathedral specially constructed for that purpose alone. Of the huge piece, only the Prologue, and possibly some other sections, were performed during the composer's lifetime. The score itself is part of the presentation: it was huge, amounting to 800 pages in the lost fair copy, and 2,000 pages in the copy in the Paris Bibliothèque Nationale; some of the pages were cut and mounted in the shape of the cross, on cloth and colored paper. The score contains numerous fold-outs and collages. Some of the performance markings, in addition to the repairs, were in the composer's own blood.

== Photos, images ==
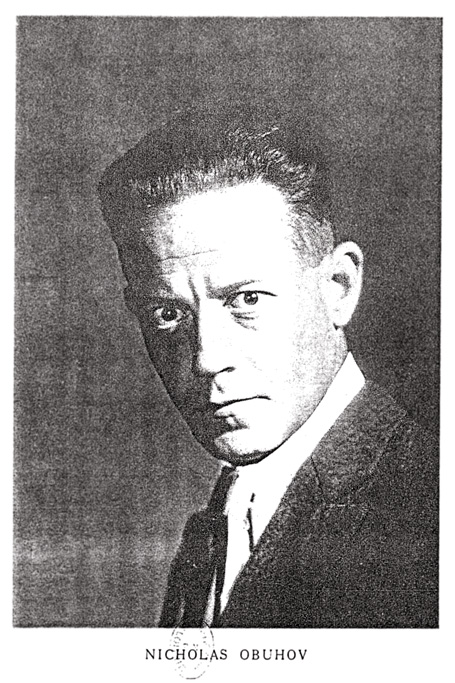
Nikolai Obukhov. 1930s.

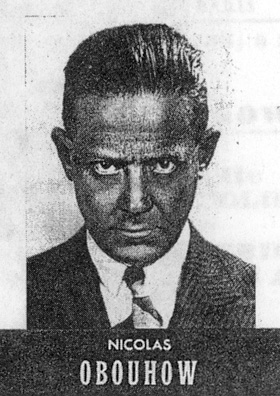
Nikolai Obukhov. A fragment of a poster from the 1930s.

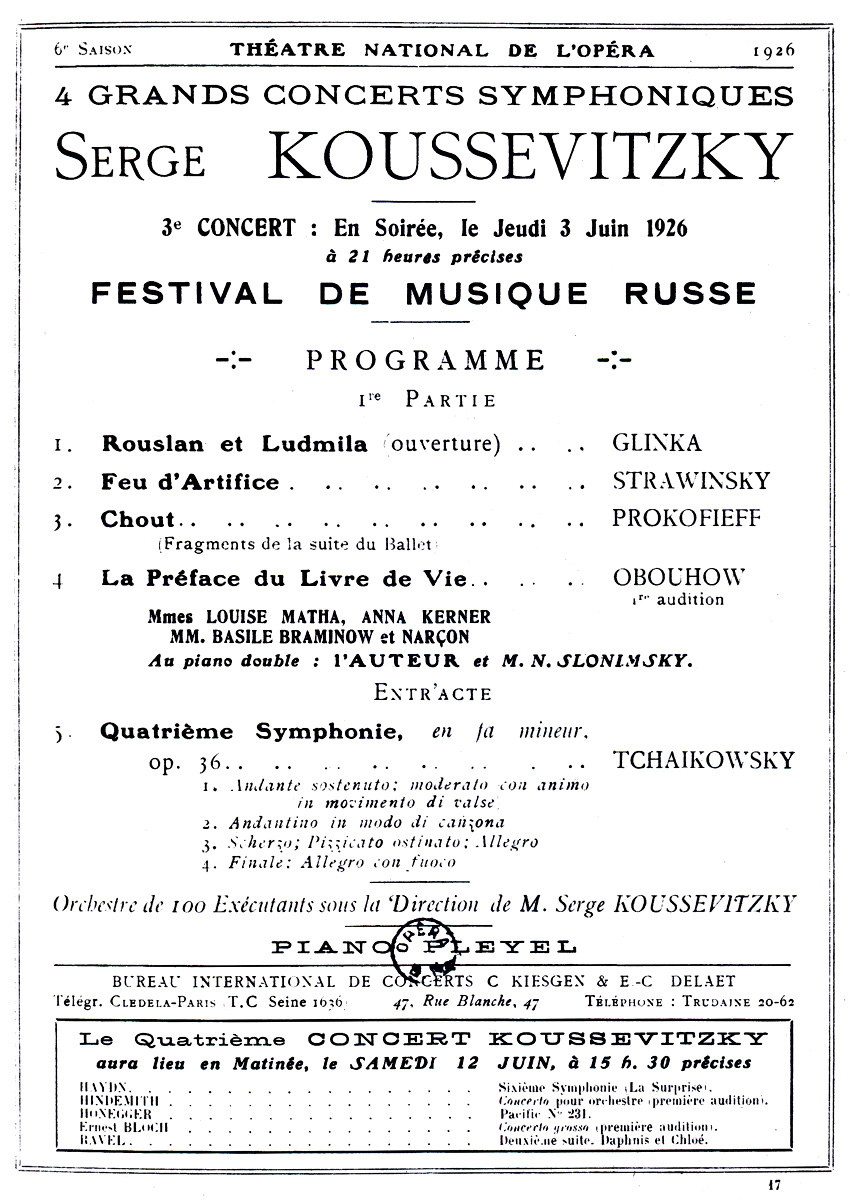
The concert poster of 3 June 1926.

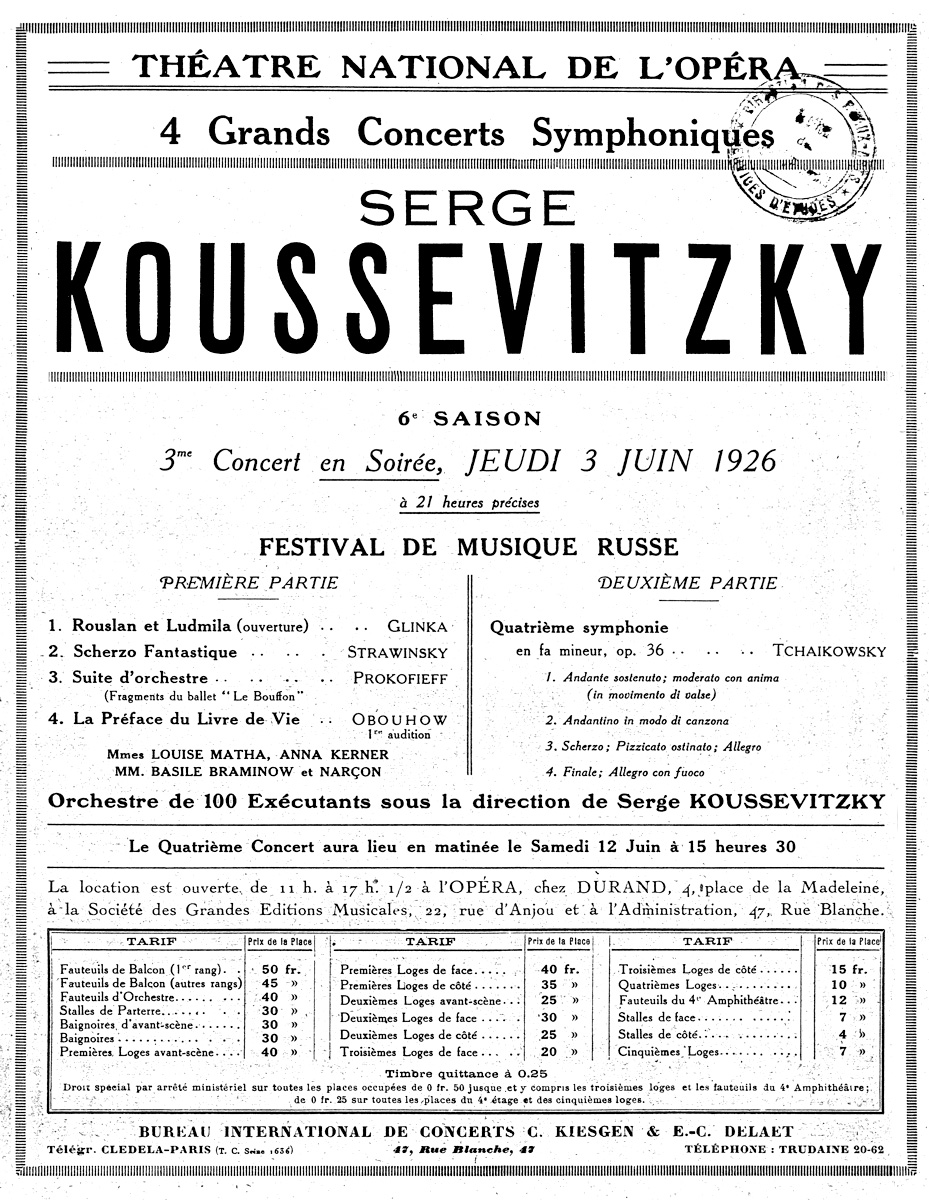
The concert poster of 3 June 1926.
