= Kiev Governorate (1708–1764) =

1708–1764 unit of Russia

Kiev Governorate Киевская губерния (Russian)
- Governorate of the Russian Empire
- 1708–1764
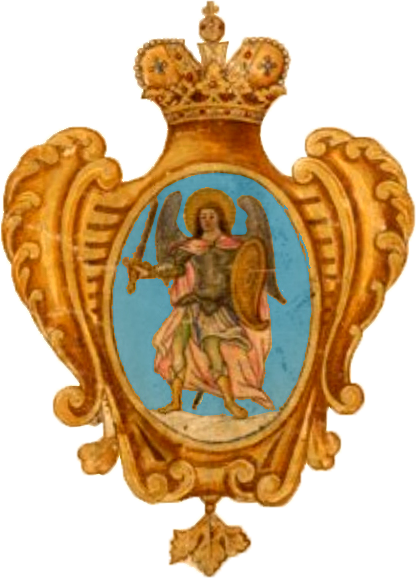
- Coat of arms
- Capital: Kiev (Kyiv)
- Government
- Governor
  - 1707–1719: Dmitriy Golitsyn
- History
  - Established: December 18 (29) 1708
  - Disestablished: 7 November 1764
- Political subdivisions: provinces: 4 regiments: 10
Preceded by	Succeeded by
Cossack Hetmanate; Belgorod Razryad	Little Russia Governorate (1764-1781); Belgorod Governorate
- Today part of: Ukraine; Russia

Division of the Russian Empire into eight guberniyas in 1708

Kiev Governorate (Note: Russian: Киевская губерния, pre-1918: Кіевская губернія, romanized: Kiyevskaya guberniya; Ukrainian: Київська губернія) was an administrative-territorial unit (guberniya) of the Tsardom of Russia and the Russian Empire. It was established in December 1708 as one of the eight guberniyas first created during the reforms of Peter the Great.

The first established Kiev Governorate was located east of Dnieper, unlike the second (Kiev Governorate) which was established west of Dnieper in 1802 after the partitions of Poland.

== Description ==
The Government of Kiev in the 18th century greatly differed from the Government of Kiev in the 19th century. When one was exclusively located on the left banks of Dnieper, the other one happened to be located across the river. In territorial reform of Catherine the Great changed the name for government to the Russian vice royalty in 1781. The first Government of Kiev was established on the most part of the Cossack Hetmanate including a vast territory to east of the Hetmanate as well, while the Zaporizhian Sich was in a condominium of the Russian Empire and the Polish–Lithuanian Commonwealth.

In 1727, it was split into Government of Kiev and Government of Belgorod, becoming a separate province under government of Hetman Apostol. In 1764 there was another division when the government of Little Russia and New Russia were established.

In 1781, the governments of Kiev and Little Russia were reorganized into vice-royalties of Kiev, Novhorod-Siversky, and Chernihiv soon after the partition of Poland (Polish–Lithuanian Commonwealth). In 1796 the vice-royalty of Kiev was renamed back into the Government of Kiev.

The borders of the Governorate underwent significant changes, in particular in 1796 when most of its territory was relocated from the left-bank Ukraine to the right-bank Ukraine. Kiev was the administrative centre of the guberniya.

== Foundation and early reforms ==
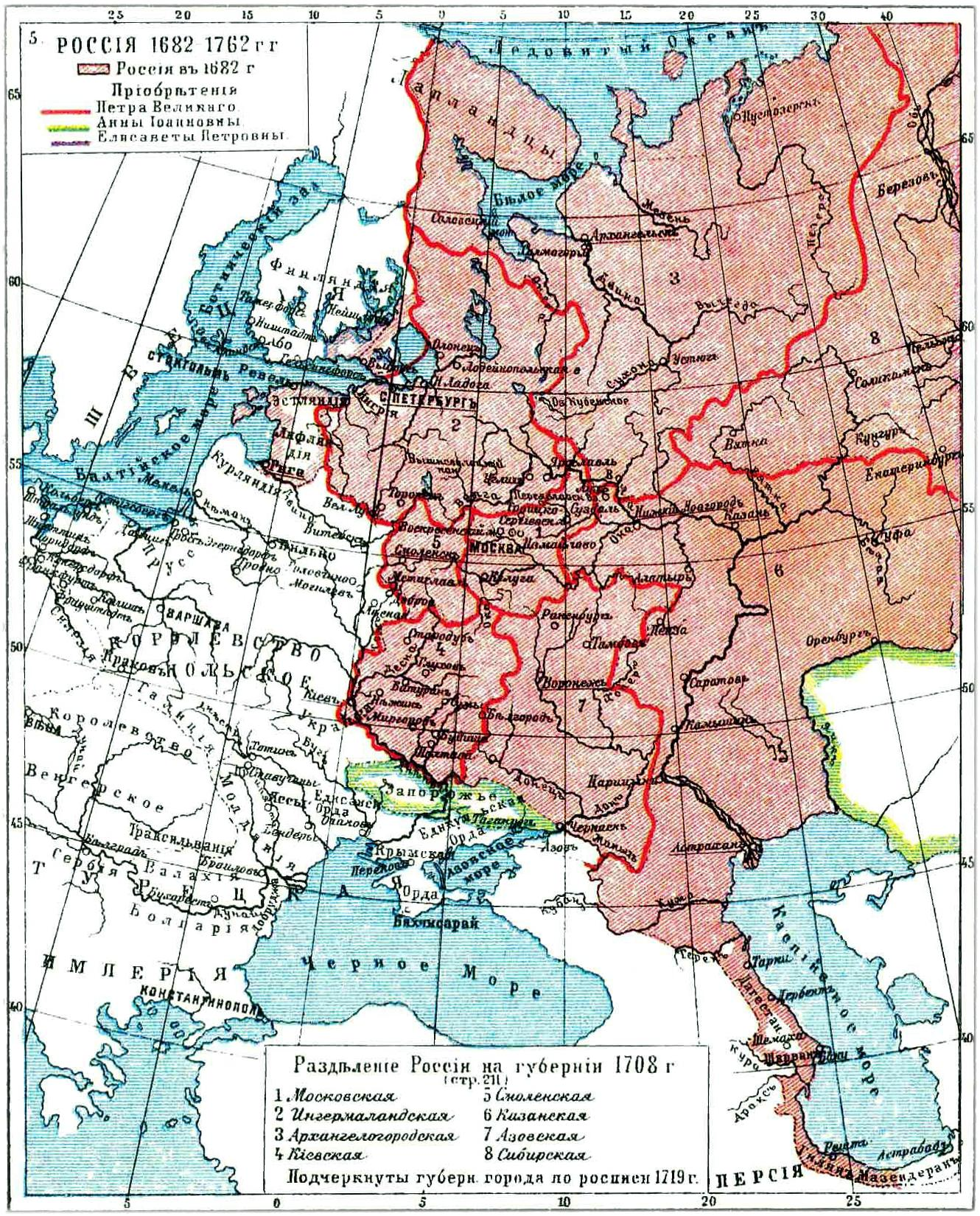
Russia in 1682–1762

Kiev Governorate, together with seven other governorates, was established on December 29 [O.S. December 18], 1708, by an edict from Tsar Peter the Great. As with the rest of the governorates, neither the borders nor internal subdivisions of Kiev Governorate were defined; instead, the territory was defined as a set of cities and the lands adjacent to those cities. The original territory was roughly based on the Siever land surrounded by Smolensk, Moscow, and Azov Governorates.

Cities included into Kiev Governorate at the time of its establishment
#	City	#	City	#	City
1.	Kiev	14.	Sumy	27.	Sevesk
2.	Pereslavl	15.	Krasnopolye	28.	Kursk
3.	Chernigov	16.	Mezhirichi	29.	Mtsensk
4.	Nezhin	17.	Zolochev	30.	Putivl
5.	Novobogoroditskoy	18.	Buromlya	31.	Karachev
6.	Sergiyevskoy	19.	Rublevka	32.	Kromy
7.	Kamennoy Zaton	20.	Gorodnoye	33.	Rylsk
8.	Belgorod	21.	Sudzha	34.	Bryansk
9.	Akhtyrka	22.	Lebedyan	35.	Orel
10.	Bogodukhov	23.	Miropol	36.	Novosil
11.	Murakhva	24.	selo of Vena		
12.	Sennoye	25.	Belopolye		
13.	Bolkhov	26.	Olshanka		

Additionally, seventeen cities (according to the source; only sixteen were actually listed) of Azov Governorate were assigned to Kiev due to their greater geographical proximity to Kiev than to Azov. Among such cities were Kharkov and Staroy Oskol. Also to Kiev was assigned Trubchevsk and two other cities from Smolensk Governorate while some cities of Kiev were assigned to Azov and Smolensk, respectively.

As the administrative unit, the governorate was preceded by the Regimental division of the Cossack Hetmanate. Remarkable is the fact that both divisions existed through most of the 18th century during which the Regimental division as administrative was phased away and later existed solely for military purposes. At the time of its foundation the governorate covered 231,000 square kilometers (89,000 sq mi) of territory of parts of modern Ukraine and southwestern Russia.

Initially divided into uyezds and razryads, the governorate abolished the obsolete administrative system of the rapidly growing empire. During the administrative reform of 1710, all governorates where subdivided into administrative-fiscal lots (doli), and Kiev Governorate consisted of five lots. The lots were administer by landrats, from the German land-councilor.

A new reform edict was issued on May 29, 1719. Lots were abolished and the governorate was subdivided into four provinces centered on Belgorod, Kiev, Oryol, and Sevsk, and named accordingly. By 1719, the Governorate comprised forty-one cities. The provinces, in their turn, were divided into districts. Despite the reform, the subdivision of the Governorate into regiments was still used in parallel with the provinces.

In the course of the 1727 administrative reform, Belgorod, Oryol and Sevsk Provinces were split off into Belgorod Governorate, with only Kiev Province left in the Kiev Governorate. The guberniya at this time was divided into uyezds that replaced districts.

== Subdivisions ==
=== Subdivisions before 1727 (provinces) ===
Until 1727, the governorate was divided into 4 provinces:

- Kiev province, was governed by the Hetman of the Zaporozhian Host and the Collegium of Little Russia
  - Cossack Hetmanate regiments: Kiev, Pereiaslav, Myrhorod, Lubny, Nizhyn, Pryluky, Chernihiv, Starodub, Hadiach
- Belgorod province
- Oryol province
- Sevsk province

=== Subdivisions after 1727 (polki) ===
After Belgorod Governorate split, Kiev Governorate main subdivisions became regiments (polki) of the Cossack Hetmanate.

- Chernihiv Regiment
- Hadiach Regiment
- Kiev Regiment
- Lubny Regiment
- Myrhorod Regiment
- Nizhyn Regiement
- Pereiaslav Regiment
- Pryluky Regiment
- Starodub Regiment

== See also ==
- Truce of Andrusovo
- Cossack Hetmanate
