= Leonid Kosakivsky =

Ukrainian politician

- Леонід Косаківський
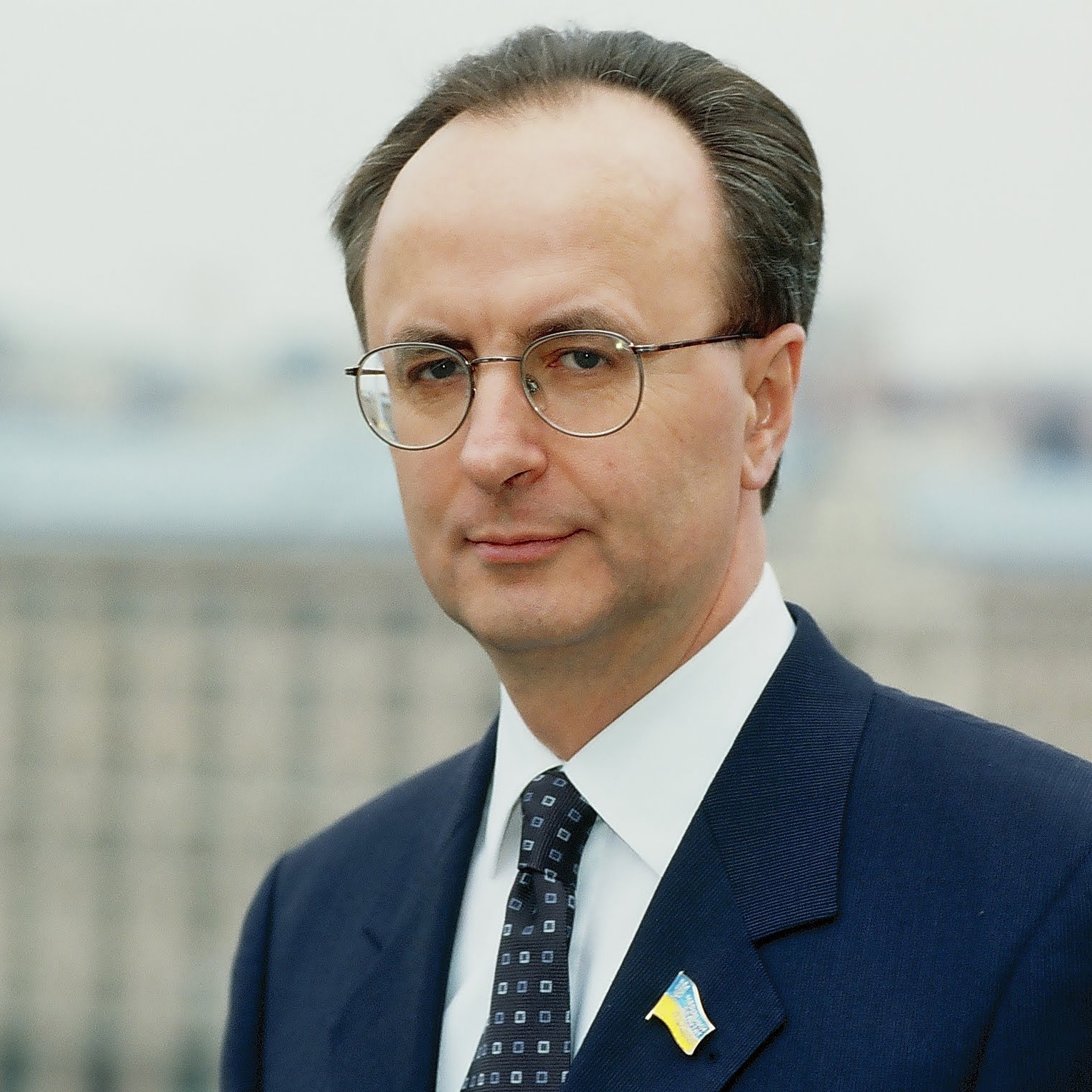
- Kosakivsky in 2002

Mayor of Kyiv
- In office 10 July 1994 – 12 May 1998 (De facto 29 April 1993 – 10 July 1994)
- Preceded by: Position established (Ivan Salii as Presidential Representative)
- Succeeded by: Oleksandr Omelchenko

People's Deputy of Ukraine
- In office 29 March 1998 – 14 May 2002
- Preceded by: Constituency established
- Succeeded by: Borys Bespalyi
- Constituency: Kyiv, No. 223

Personal details
- Born: 21 January 1950 (age 76) Chernivtsi, Vinnytsia Oblast, Ukrainian SSR, Soviet Union
- Party: Independent
- Other political affiliations: Batkivshchyna (1999–2001); Hromada (1998–1999); Communist Party of the Soviet Union (until 1991)
- Spouse: Iryna
- Education: Taras Shevchenko University of Kyiv; Kyiv Higher Party School
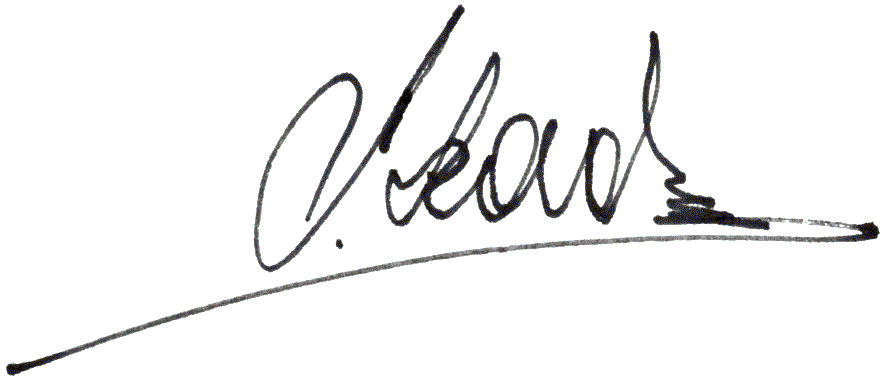
- Signature

Military service
- Allegiance: Soviet Union
- Branch/service: Soviet Army
- Years of service: 1973–1975
- Unit: Carpathian Military District

Leonid Hryhorovych Kosakivsky (Ukrainian: Леонід Григорович Косаківський; born 21 January 1950) is a Ukrainian politician who was the first democratically elected mayor of Kyiv, serving from 1993 to 1998. He was also a People's Deputy of Ukraine from Ukraine's 223rd electoral district from 1998 to 2002.

== Early life and career ==
Leonid Hryhorovych Kosakivsky was born on 21 January 1950 in the village of Chernivtsi, Vinnytsia Oblast – then part of the Soviet Union – to ethnic Ukrainians Yuzefa Myronivna and Hryhorii Mykolaiovych Kosakivsky. He received his secondary education at Middle School No. 17 in Vinnytsia, graduating in 1967. He later studied at the University of Kyiv Faculty of Radio Physics, Electronics and Computer Systems and graduated in 1973 before serving two years in the Soviet Army as part of the Carpathian Military District. After military service, Kosakivsky worked as an engineer at the Arsenal Factory in Kyiv from 1975 to 1980.

== Political career ==
Kosakivsky began working within the Communist Party of the Soviet Union from 1980, first serving as an instructor in Kyiv's Pecherskyi District. From December 1985 he worked as head of the organisational and statutory issues sector of the Organisational and Party Work Department of the Communist Party in Kyiv. Between June 1988 and April 1991 he was consecutively second secretary and first secretary of the Communist Party in Pecherskyi District. From September 1990 he was deputy head of the Revision Commission of the Communist Party of Ukraine. Kosakivsky graduated from the Kyiv Higher Party School in 1989. In 1990, he was elected as a deputy to the Pechersk District Council of People's Deputies and to the Kyiv City Council. In January 1991, he became the Head of the Pechersk District Council of People's Deputies and its executive committee. From April 1992, Kosakivsky served as the Representative of the President of Ukraine in the Pechersk District.

=== Mayor of Kyiv ===
President Leonid Kravchuk removed Ivan Salii from the position of Presidential Representative in Kyiv on 12 April 1993 and appointed Leonid Kosakivsky to this position, who had previously held the post of the President of Ukraine's representative in the Pecherskyi district of the city of Kyiv. On the eve of the appointment, on April 20, 1993, a session of the Kyiv City Council considered the issue of approving the candidacy of Leonid Kosakivsky for the position of the President's Representative in the city. During the vote, his candidacy was supported by 110 deputies (primarily the left wing of the political spectrum — roughly half of the 222 deputies who participated in the voting), while 105 deputies (the national-democrats) voted against. As a result, the candidacy was not approved, but no other decision on the matter was adopted either. Relying on the provisions of Part 4, Article 2 of the then-current Law of Ukraine "On the Representative of the President of Ukraine", which granted the head of state the right to appoint his Representative at his own discretion if the Council failed to make any decision on the proposed candidacy within two weeks, President of Ukraine Leonid Kravchuk on April 29, 1993, appointed Leonid Kosakivsky to this position. This decision caused dissatisfaction among some deputies who had opposed his candidacy. Nevertheless, after Leonid Kosakivsky's appointment as the President's Representative in the capital, relations between the city state administration and the City Council and its chairman, Vasyl Nesterenko, took on a more civilized character than during the tenure of Kosakivsky's predecessor, Ivan Salii. At that time, relations between the representative and executive branches of power in Kyiv had been predominantly confrontational. With Kosakivsky's arrival, the situation changed. On May 19, 1993, the newspaper Vechirniy Kyiv noted that "with the change of leadership, the 'cold war' waged by the former administration against the City Council came to an end. From the very first moments of his appointment, through his actions and statements, Leonid Kosakivsky pursued an exceptionally correct policy toward the City Council and initiated joint work, as prescribed by law." Subsequently, their contacts were maintained in such a working state that did not hinder their common cause.

A February 1994 law provided for direct elections to the heads of Ukraine's municipalities, including Kyiv. The first round of the election on June 26, 1994, did not produce a winner: Leonid Kosakivsky received 324,024 votes (17.05% of all registered voters), Volodymyr Cherniak — 294,194 (15.48%), and Ivan Salii — 249,963 (13.15%). Leonid Kosakivsky and Volodymyr Cherniak, the head of the public association "Stolytsia" and a member of the "People's Movement of Ukraine," advanced to the second round. Following the voting on July 10, 1994, Leonid Kosakivsky emerged victorious, securing 549,904 votes (29.59% of all registered voters, or 54.6% of those who participated in the voting). His opponent received 403,367 votes (21.71%). At the same time, among the 68 deputies elected to the city council, most seats were won by representatives of parties and groups opposed to Leonid Kosakivsky Kosakivsky's connection to Kravchuk, who was simultaneously running in the that year's presidential election, led Kravchuk to win the city in his own election, though he was not ultimately elected. Іn the presidential elections held in Kyiv on the same day, Kuchma received 200,000 fewer votes than Kosakivsky did in the mayoral election.

So, on July 10, 1994, for the first time in Kyiv's history, Kosakivsky was elected Head of the Kyiv City Council in free and democratic direct elections by the city's residents. As he stated immediately after the election, his objective was to act as a mayor for all citizens—not beholden to political factions—and to uphold the city's interests in every sphere, as he had pledged during his campaign. As mayor, during the period when Kosakivsky actually held leadership positions, he placed a strategic emphasis on supporting the industrial and scientific potential of Kyiv. Construction activity was preserved and revived. Between 1994 and 1995, 1.6 times more residential housing and four times as many schools and kindergartens were built compared to the following two years (1996–1997), after he was removed from executive office. The decision was made to launch the renovation of buildings constructed in the 1960s. Urban transport infrastructure also improved markedly: the city acquired a significant number of new buses, trolleybuses, and trams. A metro development plan extending to 2010 was approved and set in motion. 4 new metro stations have been opened. For the first time, a municipal summer recreation program for children was introduced with funding from the city budget. Special attention was devoted to expanding social services and veteran support. The city's financial condition remained stable, and Kyiv demonstrated the best economic performance indicators among Ukrainian cities. This period was also marked by notable developments in the cultural and spiritual life of the capital. Kyiv reinstated its historic coat of arms and flag. Traditional fairs were revived, and restoration efforts began for key historical and cultural landmarks. The monument to Grand Princess Olga was reconstructed, and approval was granted for the restoration of the Church of the Virgin Mary of Pyrohiv, as well as the Mykhailivskyi and Assumption cathedrals. The names of prominent figures such as Serge Lifar and Vladimir Horowitz were restored to their city of origin, and competitions bearing their names were established. One of Kyiv's most beloved recreational sites, Spivoche Pole ("Singing Field"), was developed during this time. In 1993, a memorial sign was erected on St. Michael's Square in Kyiv to the victims of the Holodomor in Ukraine (1932–1933). On April 30, 1995, a solemn opening of the Memorial Complex in memory of the victims of the political repressions of the 1930s Great Purge took place in Bykivnia Bykivnia graves, with the participation of thousands of public representatives, families of the repressed, the Kyiv City Mayor, and deputies. As mayor, Kosakivsky moved decisively to protect the city's extensive architectural heritage, prohibiting the construction of modern buildings and the destruction of historical buildings in historical parts of Kyiv. Kosakivsky also expelled street vendors from Khreshchatyk, Kyiv's main street.Kosakivsky's government signed agreements with Kyiv's universities, intending to use graduates to develop the local economy and cultural heritage.

However, Kosakivsky faced mounting resistance. Central authorities grew increasingly concerned about the city's growing autonomy and the Kyiv Council Chairman's refusal to surrender key municipal assets to state ownership, to allocate land for government housing, or to prioritize elite construction projects. Particularly controversial were his objections to redirecting city funds toward the renovation of the Palace of Culture "Ukraine"—he proposed instead to allocate those resources for metro expansion. He also denied land for the construction of a high-rise "President-Hotel" near Mariinskyi Park and opposed elite residential development on Desiatynna Street, 10. Taking advantage of the Constitutional Agreement, which allowed Kosakivsky to simultaneously serve as both the Head of the Kyiv City Council and Head of the Kyiv City State Administration from July 1995, the executive branch dismissed him from his administrative post in July 1996—while he was ill. At the height of the conflict, Omelchenko's supporters repeatedly broke into the mayor's office and unsuccessfully searched for incriminating materials against Kosakivsky. Kosakivsky was later removed from office and replaced by Oleksandr Omelchenko as a result of a decree by President Leonid Kuchma. Kosakivsky was blocked from entering his office by the Militsiya and forced to work in a temporary office for 300 days. Prime Minister Pavlo Lazarenko actively supported Omelchenko against Kosakivsky during this time as part of his efforts to acquire further control over Ukraine. However, unable to remove him from the elected position of City Council Head, central authorities resorted to obstructing his activities. The City Council was deliberately fragmented and prevented from convening lawfully. As a result, the City Administration unlawfully assumed control over land, property, and financial decisions—effectively placing Kyiv under direct presidential rule. After failing to pressure Kosakivskyi into submission, in June 1997 the authorities once again attempted to oust him—this time using the newly adopted Law on Local Self-Government, which had granted him the formal status of City Mayor. Despite backing from the Verkhovna Rada of Ukraine and the Council of Europe, as well as legal victories in the Starokyivskyi District Court and the Supreme Court of Ukraine—which fully reinstated his rights and nullified the unlawful decisions of certain deputies—executive authorities continued to hinder his ability to perform his duties, going so far as to station police outside his office. Nonetheless, Kosakivsky stood firm. He remained loyal to those who had elected him, refused to capitulate to political pressure, and continued to advocate for restoring power to the citizens of Kyiv. He actively contributed to the legislative defense of local self-governance, influencing the drafting of the Law on Local Self-Government and the Law on the Capital. He also worked to raise international awareness—particularly within the Council of Europe—about the challenges facing local democracy in Ukraine's capital.

Kosakivsky intended to participate in both the 1998 Ukrainian parliamentary election and Kyiv's mayoral election, scheduled to be held the same year. On 27 March 1998, the Constitutional Court of Ukraine ruled that the Verkhovna Rada's law allowing a mayoral election in Kyiv was unconstitutional, as the city's borders had not been properly defined at the time. Kosakivsky believed the Constitutional Court's decision was made with the intention of preventing him from winning another election as mayor of Kyiv; he claimed to Interfax in October 1998 that he could have won 53% of the vote in a head-to-head race against Omelchenko. Ultimately, however, he chose to continue participating in the parliamentary elections, leading him to be removed as mayor. As a result, Omelchenko was appointed mayor in his place.

In the final years of Leonid Kosakivsky's tenure in power in Kyiv, and later after his resignation, a campaign of what later turned out to be false accusations was launched against the politician. It began after publications appeared in the press alleging that Kosakivsky harbored presidential ambitions. Several Kyiv newspapers, mainly Evening Kyiv and Kievskiye Vedomosti, published articles about supposed abuses of power and violations of the law by Leonid Kosakivsky. Some of these publications were later ruled by the courts to be untrue, and the newspapers were forced to publish retractions. At the same time, other outlets — such as Holos Ukrayiny Silski Visti, Pravda Ukrainy, Demokratychna Ukraina, Profspilkova Gazeta, and others as well as various radio and television broadcasts — launched a counter-campaign to persuade Kyiv residents that such accusations were unfounded. Meanwhile, the authors of the commissioned articles faced allegations of orchestrating a deliberate campaign to discredit the capital's mayor. A number of objective materials were published by the weekly Zerkalo Nedeli, the newspaper Ukraina. Yevropa. Svit, and several other publications. Some foreign newspapers even described these events as a conspiracy against Kosakivsky by business groups and certain politicians who had not received land plots from the mayor and were dissatisfied with his activities. Accusations that residential construction in Kyiv had allegedly "come to a halt" under Kosakivsky were refuted by Oleksandr Omelchenko in a newspaper interview in July 1996. On May 21, 1996, the Cabinet of Ministers of Ukraine instructed the Ministry of Internal Affairs to verify the credibility of the press reports regarding alleged abuses by Leonid Kosakivsky and to inform the Cabinet of the results. The investigation conducted by the Ministry of Internal Affairs did not confirm any of the violations attributed to Leonid Kosakivsky by the media. There was an opinion that the entire accusatory campaign in the press and the artificially inflated topic of Kosakivsky's alleged presidential ambitions were aimed at pushing Leonid Kuchma to make a decision to dismiss Kosakivsky and to justify that decision.

=== People's Deputy of Ukraine ===
Kosakivsky was a candidate in the 1998 Ukrainian parliamentary election, as an independent in Ukraine's 223rd electoral district, which at the time included the Pecherskyi, Old Kyiv, and Shevchenkivskyi districts of Kyiv. He was successfully elected and served as a member of the Verkhovna Rada Budget Committee. In Parliament, Kosakivsky was a member of the Hromada, Batkivshchyna parliamentary factions, later becoming independent toward the end of his term. He was a member Batkivshchyna party from October 1999 to November 2001. He authored or co-authored 53 draft legislative acts, submitted over 300 amendments to draft laws, and spoke at parliamentary sessions 258 times. From 1998 to 2002, he was also a member of the Permanent Delegation of the Verkhovna Rada of Ukraine to the Parliamentary Assembly of the Council of Europe. He was an unsuccessful candidate in the 2002 Ukrainian parliamentary election for Ukraine's 217th electoral district, placing 8th out of 21 candidates with 4.46% of the vote.

== Later career ==
Since leaving office, Kosakivsky has continued to comment on politics.He is an independent expert in local self-governance and state building, budget policy, engaged in public activities, political consulting, research on the history of Kyiv, and regularly publishes articles in the media as well as gives reports and lectures.
