= Lukianivka (neighborhood) =

Neighbourhood of Kyiv

Coordinates: 50°27′51.55″N 30°28′44.84″E

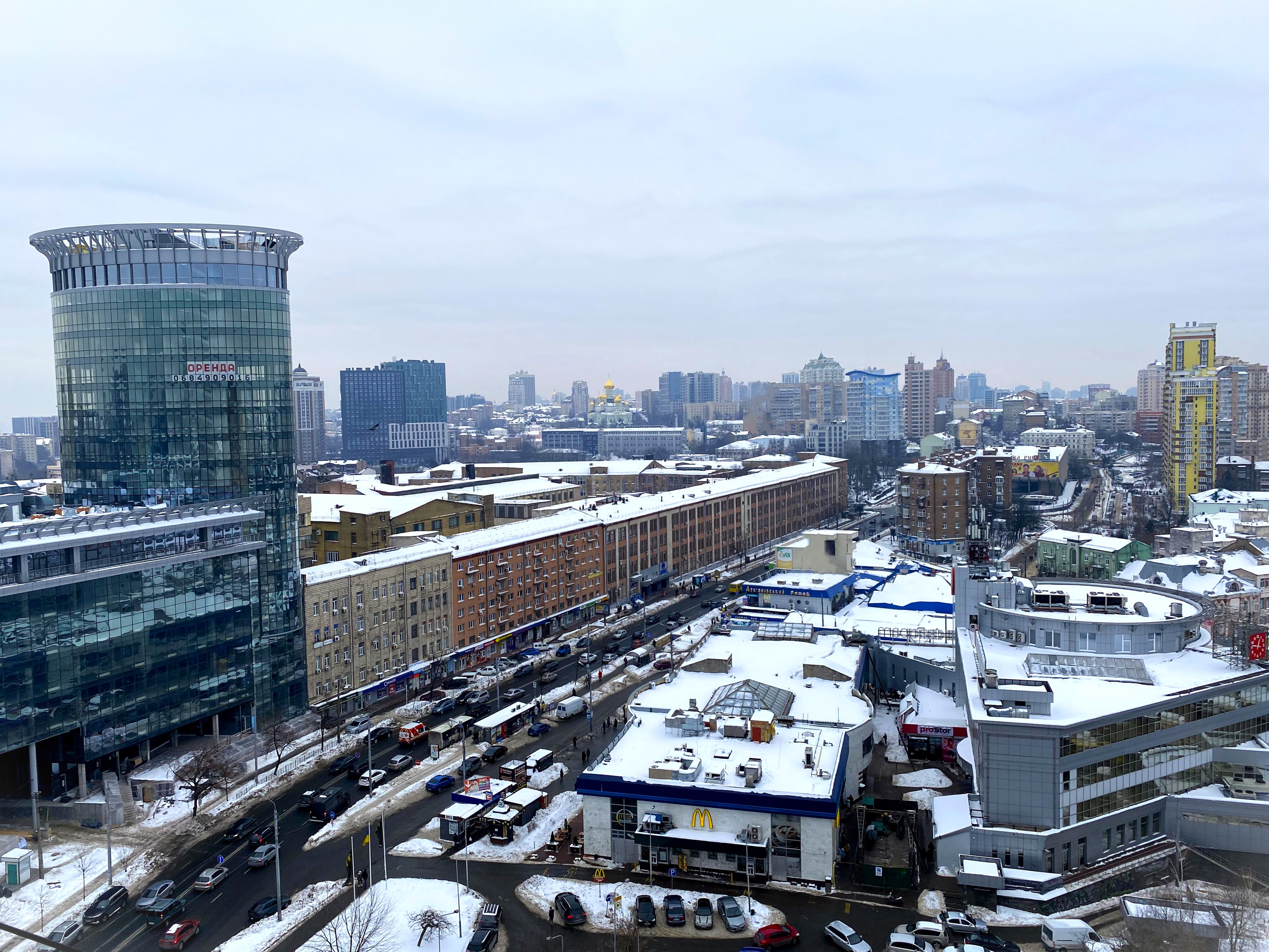
Lukianivka landscape

Lukianivka (Ukrainian: Лук'янівка), or Lukyanivka, is a historical neighborhood in the northwestern part of the city of Kyiv, the capital of Ukraine. It is situated on the right bank of Dnieper, at a short distance from Babyn Yar (part of Kurenivka).

The Kyiv Metro station located in the neighborhood is Lukianivska, on the Syretsko-Pecherska Line.

The area is also known for the Lukianivska Prison.

The neighborhood was named after a Podil guildmaster and "began to grow after the great flood of 1845 forced many inhabitants to higher ground"; its population in 1874 was 9,806. In the spring of 1911, the body of Andrii Yushchynskyi was found in a cave in Lukianivka, leading to the Mendel Beilis case.

The Kyiv TV Tower was built on top of the Jewish cemetery in Lukianivka. The cemetery was officially closed in 1966 and Jewish families were given six months to rebury their relatives in the Jewish areas of a new cemetery in the city. Since the relatives of the interred had been killed in the Babyn Yar massacre, most of the graves were not moved. After the headstones had been destroyed or removed the antenna was built on top of the existing graves.

== Historical overview ==
- 1820 — first mention of Lukianivka settlement;
- 1824 — a mention of Kyiv goldsmith S. Strilbytskyi in the outskirts of Lukianivka;
- 1913 — first all-Russian olympiad in sports is held at the Sports Ground.
