= Sports Ground, Kyiv =

Former stadium in Kyiv, Ukraine

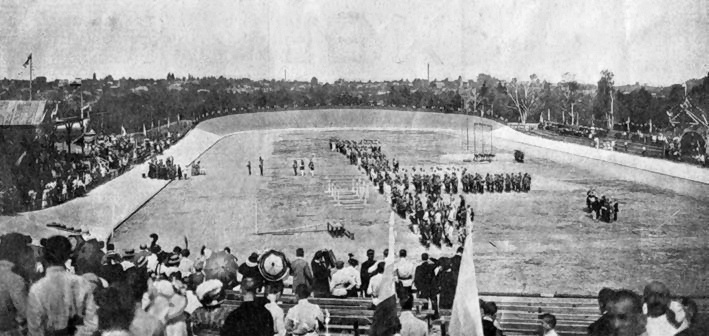
General view of the Sports Ground in Kyiv, during the First Russian Olympiad in 1913.

The Sports Ground (Ukrainian: Спортивне поле: Russian: Спортивное поле) in Kyiv, Ukraine was the first permanent sports stadium in the Russian Empire. It was opened on 12 August 1912, and used during the First All-Russian (Imperial) Olympiad in 1913. It was located in the old historic area of Lukianivka (50°27′27.6″N 30°29′21″E) of Kyiv.

The Sports Ground was destroyed during World War I.

== First All-Russian Olympiad ==
One of the most prominent events in Kyiv at that time was the First All-Russian (Imperial) Olympics. Held in 1913 and dedicated to the opening of the All-Russian industrial exhibition celebrating 300 years of the rule of Romanov family. A stadium was built in Kyiv especially for the competitions – with race-tracks, a cycle-track as well as stands for 5,000 seats. The program of the Olympiad included such sports as track and field, marathon, soccer, wrestling, weight-lifting, fencing, swimming, gymnastics, equestrianism, bicycle and motorcycle racing along the Kyiv – Chernihiv – Kyiv route.

== Literature ==
- Перший стадіон в Києві // Старт.—1987.—No. 8. (in Ukrainian)
- Рибаков М.О. Невідомі та маловідомі сторінки історії Києва — К.: Кий, 1997. ISBN 966-7161-15-3. (in Ukrainian)
- "Дзеркало тижня". — 2003.—30 серпня - 5 вересня. (in Ukrainian)
- Київ. Історична енциклопедія. З найдавніших часів до 1917 року (in Ukrainian)
- Вашъ Кiевъ — photos. (in Russian)
- 'Олімпіада на Лук'янівці' (in Ukrainian)
