= Olshanka, Belgorod Oblast =

Olshanka Ольша́нка
- Selo
- Location within Belgorod Oblast Location within Russia
- Coordinates: 51°01′N 37°41′E
- Country: Russia
- Oblast: Belgorod Oblast
- District: Chernyansky District

Olshanka (Russian: Ольша́нка) is a rural locality (a selo) in Chernyansky District of Belgorod Oblast, Russia.
