= Coat of arms of Kyiv =

- Armiger: Kyiv
- Adopted: 18 April 1995
- Shield: Azure

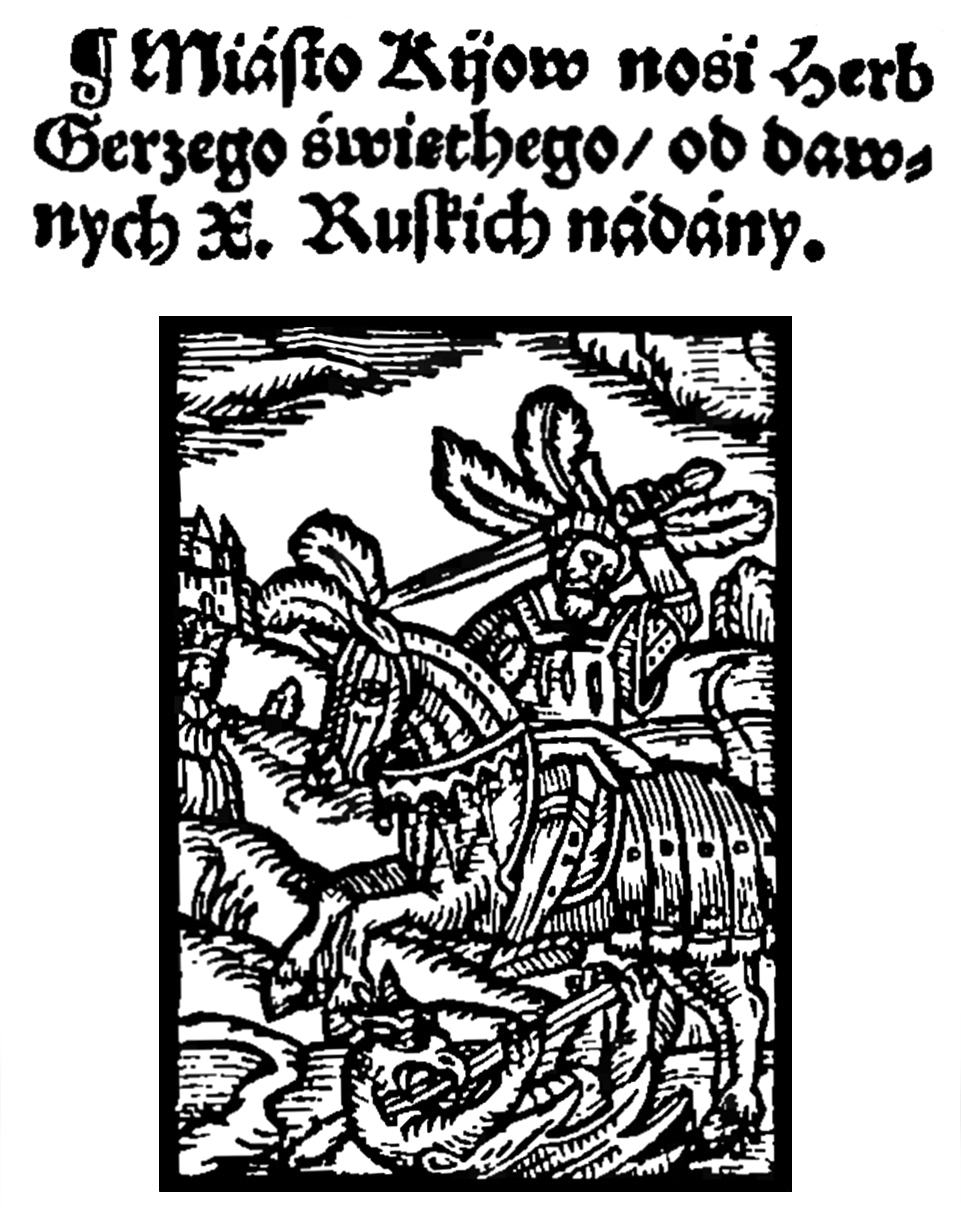
1578 coat of arms, in Polish it says "Miáſto Kijow nośi Herb Gerzego święthego / od dawnych X. Ruſkich nádány (The city of Kyiv bears the coat of arms of Saint George / that was of old given to it by the Princes of Rus')"

The coat of arms of Kyiv features the Archangel Michael officially named "Saint Michael the Archistrategos" (archistrategos, the title of chief-general in Ancient Greece), wielding a flaming sword and a shield on an azure field.

== History ==
The coat of arms traces its history back to the medieval principality of Kievan Rus', where the Archangel Michael was depicted on the seals used by the Kievan grand princes. Initially the coat of arms of Kyiv featured Saint George fighting a dragon on an azure field, and this today remains the coat of arms of the Kyiv Oblast. In the 16th century, a coat consisting of the Archangel Michael clad in white robes, holding a sword and a shield on a red field was adopted for the Kyiv Voivodeship.

In 1487, along with Magdeburg rights, the city of Kyiv received a coat of arms consisting of a hand holding a crossbow.

In 1782, a new coat of arms was approved by the order of Catherine II of Russia. In the order the coat of arms is described as "Archangel Michael in a short tunic on an azure field". Later on it was decorated with an imperial crown and other ornaments. No original image of the arms has been recovered to date. Some modern drawings of the arms exist, based on the description in Catherine's order.

In 1969, a coat of arms was introduced with chestnut leaves and a bow on the red-azure field, containing the word КИЇВ (KYIV), and such Soviet symbols as the hammer and sickle and the Hero City medal. Since 1973 the horse-chestnut leaves became one of the symbols of the city.

In May 1995, the Kyiv City Council restored the city's original coat of arms depicting the Archangel Michael.

== Gallery ==
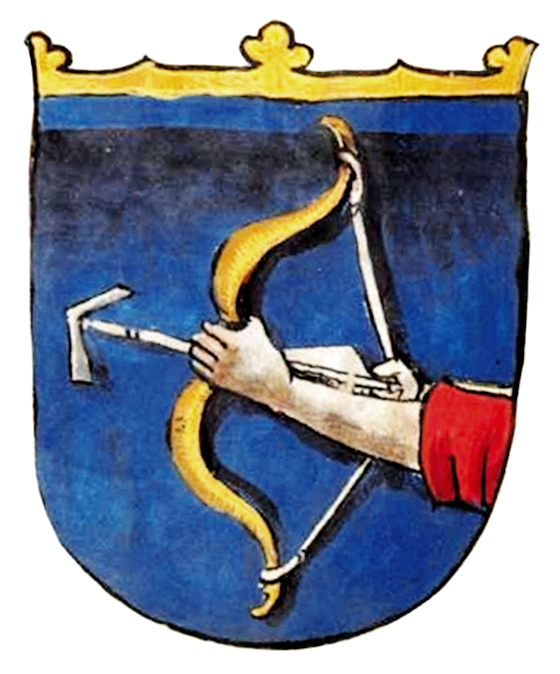
Kyiv coat of arms (1480)

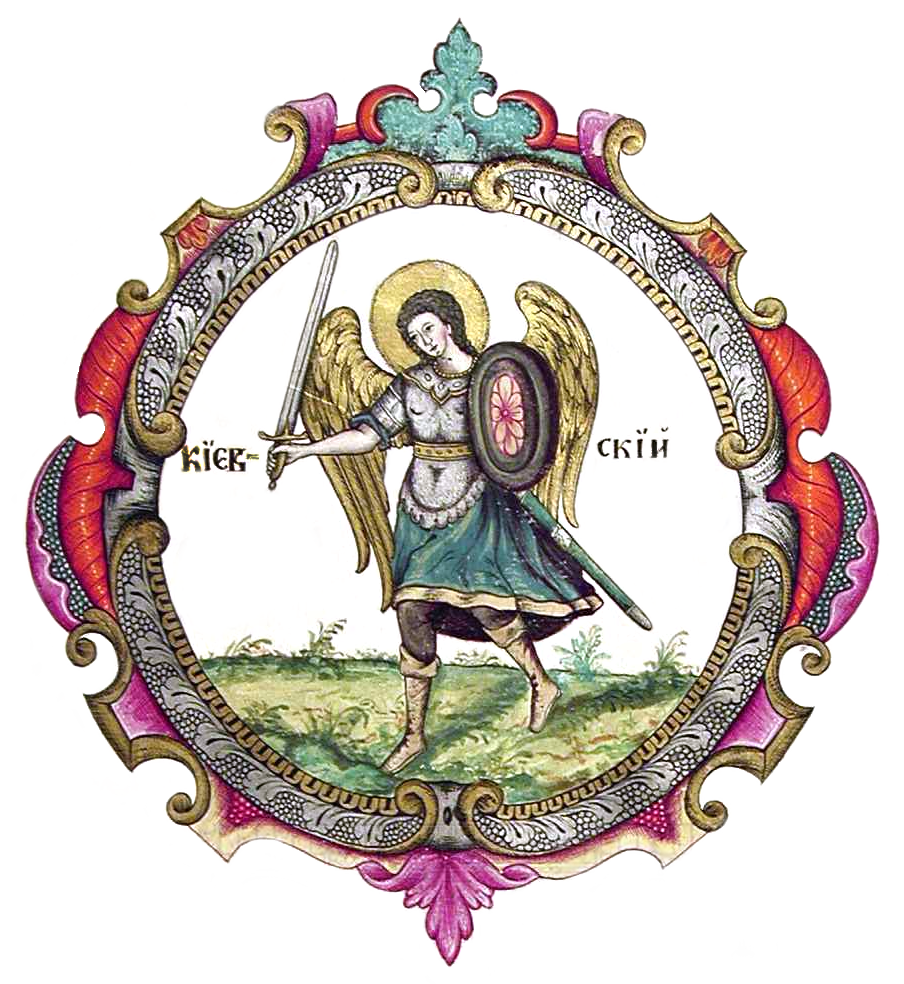
Kyiv Land coat of arms (1672)

Kyiv city magistrate coat of arms (1698, on the seal)

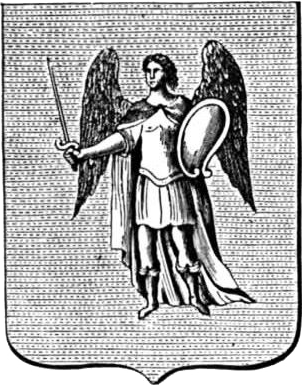
Kyiv coat of arms (1782; restored based on historical description)

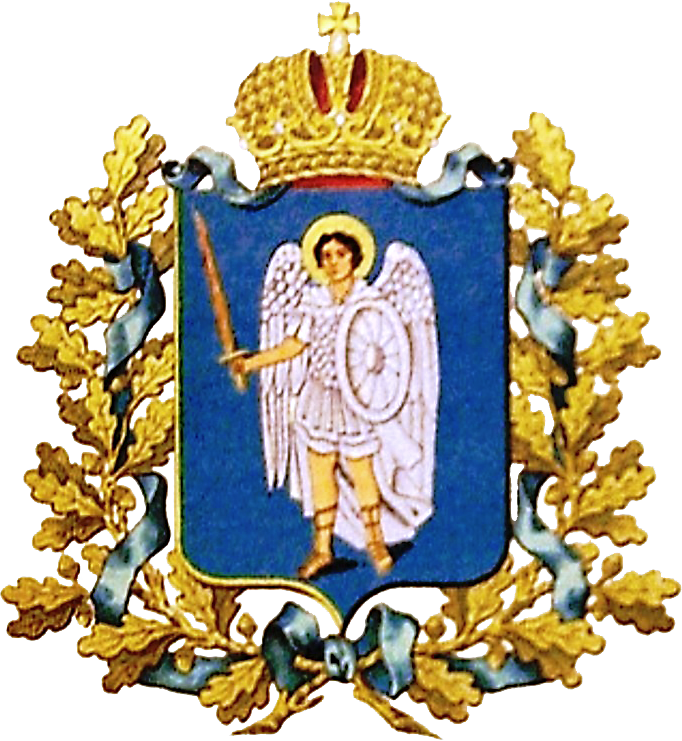
Kiev Governorate coat of arms (1856).

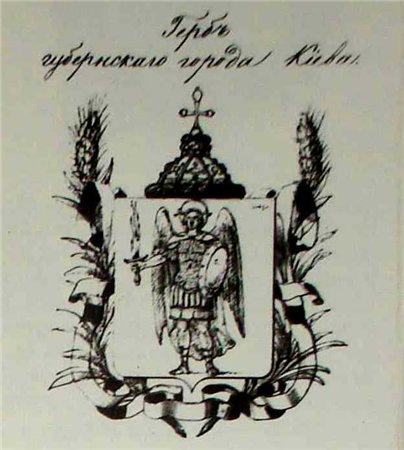
Kyiv coat of arms (1859, project)

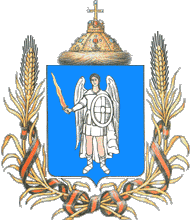
Kyiv coat of arms (1917)

Kyiv coat of arms (1969—1995)

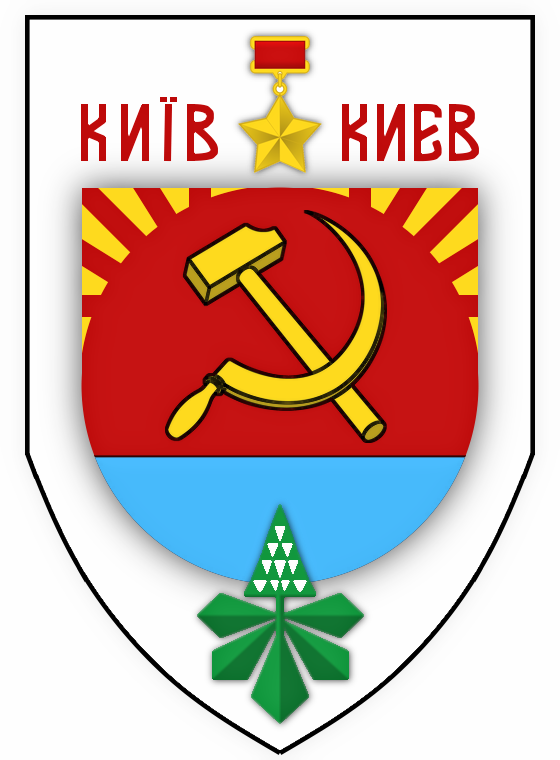
Proposed coat of arms of Kyiv for the 1500th anniversary of the city in 1982, which was not approved.

Alternative Kyiv coat of arms by Y. Solominsky, which is sometimes used by the government despite this design not being approved.

== See also ==
- Flag of Kyiv
