= List of Russian monarchs =

Monarchy of Russia
- Imperial coat of arms

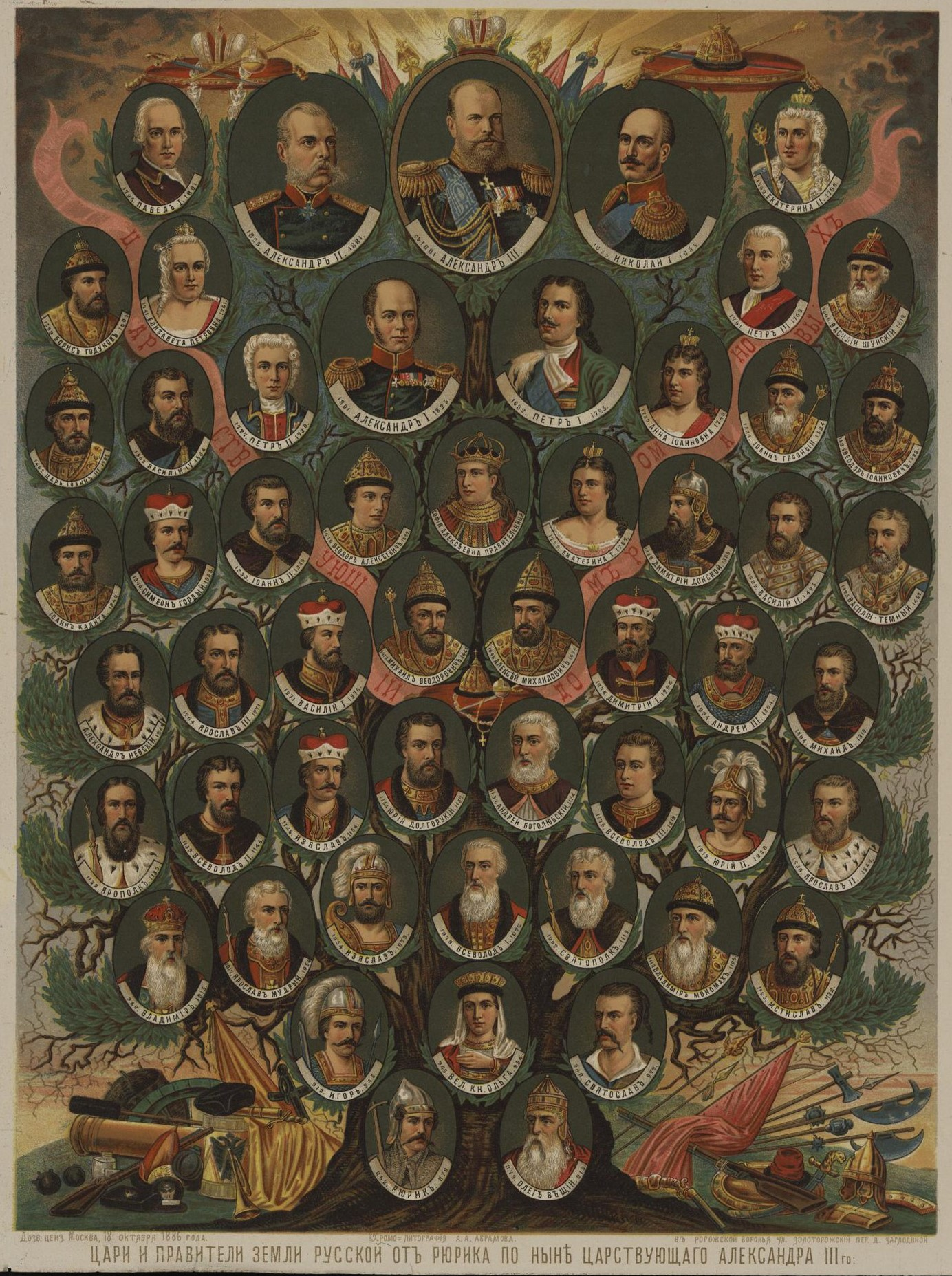
- Visualisation of Russian monarchs as a tree (1886)

Details
- Style: His/Her Imperial Majesty
- First monarch: Rurik (as Prince)
- Last monarch: Nicholas II (as Emperor)
- Formed: 862
- Abolished: 15 March 1917
- Residences: Winter Palace; Moscow Kremlin; Peterhof Palace; Catherine Palace; Alexander Palace
- Appointer: Hereditary
- Pretender: Disputed: Grand Duchess Maria Vladimirovna Prince Karl Emich of Leiningen

This is a list of Russian monarchs. The list begins with the semi-legendary prince Rurik of Novgorod, sometime in the mid-9th century, and ends with Nicholas II, who abdicated in 1917, and was murdered with his family in 1918. Two dynasties have ruled Russia: the Rurikids (862–1598) and Romanovs (1613–1917).

== Overview ==
Russian sovereigns have used a range of titles since the 9th century. The earliest titles include knyaz and veliky knyaz, which mean "prince" and "grand prince", respectively. They have sometimes been rendered as "duke" and "grand duke" in English-language literature. The title of grand prince was originally given by chroniclers to the leading prince; although other principalities emerged during the period of political fragmentation, the grand prince of Kiev was recognized as the leading prince. However, his actual powers gradually diminished during the 12th and 13th centuries, and other branches of the ruling dynasty claimed the grand princely title for themselves.

The title of grand prince of Vladimir was generally considered the most prestigious from the late 12th century, and especially from the mid-13th century. The grand prince of Moscow inherited the title, which evolved from being little more than a literary embellishment to one with clear legal overtones as the rulers of Moscow asserted their authority over most of the other Russian princes. The title of grand prince of all Russia, originally having a literary character, was also adopted by the rulers of Moscow in external relations.

After the centralized Russian state was formed in the 15th and 16th centuries, the title of tsar (meaning "caesar") followed, though its equality with the title of emperor was disputed. The title denoted the fullness of a sovereign's power and was originally reserved for the Byzantine emperor, the Holy Roman emperor, and later the khan of the Golden Horde. In a less restrictive sense, it carried a moral value when attributed to a Russian prince in literary texts. The grand princes of Moscow began using the title in external relations, and by the mid-16th century, the title of tsar of all Russia became official. By the early 18th century, the title was exchanged to that of emperor.

According to Article 59 of the Russian Constitution of 1906, the emperor of Russia held several dozen titles, each one representing a region which the sovereign governed.

== Rurikids (862–1598) ==
=== Princes of Novgorod ===
In traditional historiography, the first Russian monarch is considered to be the semi-legendary Rurik, the first prince of Novgorod. (Note: Not including legendary rulers of Novgorod such as Gostomysl.)

Name	Lifespan	Reign start	Reign end	Notes	Family	Image
Rurik: Рюрик	830–879	c. 862	c. 879	Founder of Rurik dynasty	Rurikids	
Oleg: the Seer; Олег Вещий	855–912	c. 879	c. 882	Relative of Rurik and regent for his son Igor	Rurikids	

=== Grand princes of Kiev ===
Rurik's successor Oleg moved his capital to Kiev, founding a state denoted in modern historiography as Kievan Rus' (Russian: Киевская Русь) or Ancient Rus' (Russian: Древняя Русь, Древнерусское государство). Over the next several centuries, the most important titles were grand prince of Kiev and prince of Novgorod, whose holder (often the same person) could claim hegemony.

Name	Lifespan	Reign start	Reign end	Notes	Family	Image
Oleg: the Seer; Олег Вещий	855–912	c. 882	c. 912	Successor of Askold and Dir as a regent for Rurik's son	Rurikids	
Igor I: Игорь Рюрикович	878–945	c. 912	945	Son of Rurik	Rurikids	
Sviatoslav I: Святослав Игоревич	942–972	945	March 972	Son of Igor I and Olga Regent: Olga of Kiev (945–957)	Rurikids	
Yaropolk I: Ярополк Святославич	950–980	March 972	11 June 980	Son of Sviatoslav I and Predslava	Rurikids	
Saint Vladimir I: the Great, the Baptist; Владимир Святославич (Великий)	958–1015	11 June 980	15 July 1015	Son of Sviatoslav I and Malusha; Younger brother of Yaropolk I	Rurikids	
Sviatopolk I: the Cursed; Святополк Владимирович (Окаянный)	980–1019	1015	1019	Son of Vladimir I Overthrown by Yaroslav of Novgorod	Rurikids	
Yaroslav I: the Wise; Ярослав Владимирович (Мудрый)	978–1054	Autumn 1016	22 July 1018	Son of Vladimir I and Rogneda of Polotsk Prince of Novgorod since 1010	Rurikids	
Sviatopolk I: the Cursed; Святополк Владимирович (Окаянный)	980–1019	14 August 1018	27 July 1019	Restored. Fled from Kiev after defeat from Yaroslav on Alta River	Rurikids	
Yaroslav I: the Wise; Ярослав Владимирович (Мудрый)	978–1054	27 July 1019	20 February 1054	Restored Co-ruler: Mstislav of Chernigov (1024–1036)	Rurikids	

==== Feudal period ====
The gradual disintegration of Kievan Rus' began in the 11th century, after the death of Yaroslav the Wise. The position of the grand prince was weakened by the growing influence of regional clans. In 1097, the Council of Liubech formalized the feudal nature of the lands. The Liubech conference resulted in the creation of a federative structure, with the different principalities within the structure remaining bound to Kiev as the center of the state. This structure allowed for some of the principalities to develop into semi-independent polities, with conflict between the principalities intensifying in the 12th century.

Name	Lifespan	Reign start	Reign end	Notes	Family	Image
Iziaslav I: Изяслав Ярославич	1024–1078	20 February 1054	15 September 1068	First son of Yaroslav I and Ingegerd Olofsdotter. Overthrown	Rurikids	
Vseslav: the Sorcerer; Всеслав Брячиславич (Чародей)	1039–1101	15 September 1068	29 April 1069	Great-grandson of Vladimir I Usurped the Kievan throne Prince of Polotsk (1044–67, 1071–1101)	Rurikids	
Iziaslav I: Изяслав Ярославич	1024–1078	2 May 1069	22 March 1073	Restored	Rurikids	
Sviatoslav II: Святослав Ярославич	1027–1076	22 March 1073	27 December 1076	Third son of Yaroslav I and Ingegerd Olofsdotter Prince of Chernigov (1054–73)	Rurikids	
Vsevolod I: Всеволод Ярославич	1030–1093	1076	15 July 1077	Fourth son of Yaroslav I and Ingegerd Olofsdotter; Handed over the throne to Iziaslav I Prince of Pereyaslavl (1054–73), Chernigov (1073–78). The first known of the Kiev princes to bear the title of "Prince of all Rus′"	Rurikids	
Iziaslav I: Изяслав Ярославич	1024–1078	15 July 1077	3 October 1078	Restored	Rurikids	
Vsevolod I: Всеволод Ярославич	1030–1093	3 October 1078	13 April 1093	Retook the throne after Iziaslav's death	Rurikids	
Sviatopolk II: Святополк Изяславич	1050–1113	24 April 1093	16 April 1113	Son of Iziaslav I Prince of Novgorod (1078–88), Turov (1088–93)	Rurikids	
Vladimir II: Monomakh ("He who fights alone"); Владимир Всеволодович (Мономах)	1053–1125	20 April 1113	19 May 1125	Son of Vsevolod I and Anastasia of Byzantium Prince of Smolensk (1073–78), Chernigov (1078–94), Pereyaslavl (1094–1113)	Rurikids	
Mstislav I: the Great; Мстислав Владимирович (Великий)	1076–1132	20 May 1125	15 April 1132	Son of Vladimir II and Gytha of Wessex Prince of Novgorod (1088–1117), Belgorod (1117–25)	Rurikids	

After Mstislav's death in 1132, Kievan Rus' fell into recession and a rapid decline, marking the end of a unified state. The throne of Kiev became an object of struggle between various territorial associations of Rurikid princes in the decades to come, despite Kiev losing almost all of its former glory and power.

Name	Lifespan	Reign start	Reign end	Notes	Family	Image
Yaropolk II: Ярополк Владимирович	1082–1139	17 April 1132	18 February 1139	Son of Vladimir II and Gytha of Wessex; Younger brother of Mstislav I Prince of Pereyaslavl (1114–32)	Rurikids	
Viacheslav: Вячеслав Владимирович	1083 – 2 February 1154	22 February 1139	4 March 1139	Son of Vladimir II and Gytha of Wessex Prince of Smolensk (1113–27), Turov, Pereyaslavl	Rurikids	
Vsevolod II: Всеволод Ольгович	1084–1146	5 March 1139	30 July 1146	Grandson of Sviatoslav II via Oleg of Chernigov Prince of Chernigov (1127–39)	Rurikids	
Saint Igor II: Игорь Ольгович	1096 – 19 September 1146	1 August 1146	13 August 1146	Younger brother of Vsevolod II. Overthrown	Rurikids	
Iziaslav II: Изяслав Мстиславич	1097–1154	13 August 1146	23 August 1149	Son of Mstislav I and Christina Ingesdotter of Sweden	Rurikids	
Yuri I: the Long Hands; Юрий Владимирович (Юрий Долгорукий)	1099–1157	28 August 1149	Summer 1150	Son of Vladimir II and Gytha of Wessex; Fled from Kiev when Iziaslav's troops were approaching the city Prince of Rostov and Suzdal (1113–49, 1151–57)	Rurikids	
Viacheslav: of Smolensk Вячеслав Владимирович	1083 – 2 February 1154	Summer 1150	Summer 1150	Restored. Agreed to cede the throne seeing the support of Iziaslav by the townspeople	Rurikids	
Iziaslav II: Изяслав Мстиславич	1097–1154	Summer 1150	Summer 1150	Restored. Fled to Vladimir-Volynsky under the threat of Yuri's attack	Rurikids	
Yuri I: the Long Hands; Юрий Владимирович (Юрий Долгорукий)	1099–1157	August 1150	Winter 1151	Restored	Rurikids	
Iziaslav II: Изяслав Мстиславич	1097–1154	Winter 1151	13 November 1154	Restored Co-ruler: Viacheslav	Rurikids	
Viacheslav: Вячеслав Владимирович	1083 – December 1154	Spring 1151	December 1154	Restored as Iziaslav's senior co-ruler. After Iziaslav's death Rostislav of Smolensk was proclaimed Viacheslav's new co-prince	Rurikids	
Rostislav: Ростислав Мстиславич	1110–1167	1154	January 1155	Son of Mstislav I and Christina Ingesdotter of Sweden, younger brother of Iziaslav II; Left Kiev after defeat from Iziaslav of Chernigov	Rurikids	
Iziaslav III: Изяслав Давыдович	12th century–1161	January 1155	1155	Grandson of Sviatoslav II via Davyd of Chernigov. Ceded the Kiev throne to Yuri the Long Hands Prince of Chernigov (1151–57)	Rurikids	
Yuri I: the Long Hands; Юрий Владимирович (Юрий Долгорукий)	1099–1157	20 March 1155	15 May 1157	Restored	Rurikids	
Iziaslav III: Изяслав Давыдович	12th century–1161	19 May 1157	December 1158	Restored. Defeated by Mstislav of Volhynia	Rurikids	
Mstislav II: Мстислав Изяславич	1125–1170	22 December 1158	Spring 1159	Son of Iziaslav II. Сeded the throne to Rostislav	Rurikids	
Rostislav: Ростислав Мстиславич	1110–1167	12 April 1159	8 February 1161	Restored. Overthrown by Iziaslav and fled to Belgorod	Rurikids	
Iziaslav III: Изяслав Давыдович	12th century–1161	12 February 1161	6 March 1161	Restored. Mortally wounded after failed siege of Belgorod	Rurikids	
Rostislav: Ростислав Мстиславич	1110–1167	March 1161	14 March 1167	Restored	Rurikids	
Mstislav II: Мстислав Изяславич	1125–1170	19 May 1167	12 March 1169	Restored	Rurikids	

In March 1169, a coalition of princes led by the grand prince of Vladimir, Andrey Bogolyubsky, sacked Kiev and forced the ruling prince, Mstislav II, to flee to Volhynia. Andrei appointed his brother, Gleb, as the prince of Kiev, while Andrei himself continued to rule his realm from Vladimir-on-the-Klyazma. Andrei styled himself as the grand prince of Vladimir, although the less important prince in Kiev would still bear the title of grand prince; the last prince to bear the title of grand prince of Kiev was Michael of Chernigov, who died in 1246, while the grand princes of Vladimir retained their title. The other future grand princely titles were derived from the grand princely title of Vladimir.

From that time onwards, Vladimir became one of the most influential principalities. In the south-west, the principality of Galicia-Volhynia began to emerge as a local successor to Kiev. Following the Mongol invasions, three powerful states emerged: the Grand Principality of Vladimir in the north-east, which would evolve into the Grand Principality of Moscow and become the center of the autocratic Russian state; the Kingdom of Galicia–Volhynia in the south-west, which was later annexed by Poland and Lithuania; and the Novgorod Republic in the north.

=== Grand princes of Vladimir ===
By the 12th century, the Grand Principality of Vladimir became the dominant principality in the north-east, adding its name to those of Novgorod and Kiev, culminating with the rule of Alexander Nevsky. In 1169, Andrey I's son sacked the city of Kiev, but Andrey instead stayed in Vladimir and made it his capital, while taking the title of grand prince to claim primacy, leading to political power being shifted to the north-east.

Name	Lifespan	Reign start	Reign end	Notes	Family	Image
Saint Andrey I: the Pious; Андрей Юрьевич (Боголюбский)	c.1111–1174	15 May 1157	29 June 1174	Son of Yuri I Assassinated by local nobility	Rurikids	
Mikhalko: Михалко Юрьевич	12th century	1174	September 1174	Son of Yuri I Younger brother of Andrey I	Rurikids	
Yaropolk III: Ярополк Ростиславич	12th century	1174	15 June 1175	Grandson of Yuri I	Rurikids	
Mikhalko: Михалко Юрьевич	12th century	15 June 1175	20 June 1176	Restored	Rurikids	
Vsevolod III: the Big Nest; Всеволод Юрьевич (Большое Гнездо)	1154–1212	June 1176	15 April 1212	Son of Yuri I and Helene; Younger brother of Andrey I and Mikhalko	Rurikids	
Yuri II: Юрий Всеволодович	1189–1238	1212	27 April 1216	Son of Vselovod III and Maria Shvarnovna	Rurikids	
Konstantin: of Rostov Константин Всеволодович	1186–1218	Spring 1216	2 February 1218	Son of Vsevolod III and Maria Shvarnovna; Elder brother of Yuri II	Rurikids	
Yuri II: Юрий Всеволодович	1189–1238	February 1218	4 March 1238	Restored	Rurikids	

Following the Mongol invasions, the principalities started paying tribute to the Golden Horde (the so-called "Tatar yoke"). Until the 15th century, Russian princes received a yarlyk from the khan; it was not until about 1480 that the Mongol domination of Russia formally ended.

Name	Lifespan	Reign start	Reign end	Notes	Family	Image
Yaroslav II: Ярослав Всеволодович	1191–1246	1238	30 September 1246	Son of Vsevolod III and Maria Shvarnovna; Younger brother of Yuri II and Konstantin of Rostov; Also Grand Prince of Kiev in 1236–38 and since 1243	Rurikids	
Sviatoslav III: Святослав Всеволодович	1196 – 3 February 1252	1246	1248	Son of Vsevolod III and Maria Shvarnovna; Younger brother of Yuri II, Konstantin of Rostov and Yaroslav II	Rurikids	
Mikhail: Khorobrit (the Brave); Михаил Ярославич (Хоробрит)	1229 – 15 January 1248	1248	15 January 1248	Son of Yaroslav II	Rurikids	
Sviatoslav III: Святослав Всеволодович	1196 – 3 February 1252	1248	1249	Restored	Rurikids	
Andrey II: Андрей Ярославич	1222–1264	December 1249	24 July 1252	Son of Yaroslav II; Elder brother of Mikhail Khorobrit	Rurikids	
Saint Alexander: Nevsky; Александр Ярославич (Невский)	1221–1263	1252	14 November 1263	Son of Yaroslav II and Rostislava Mstislavna, daughter of Kievan Rus' Prince Mstislav Mstislavich the Bold; Elder brother of Mikhail Khorobrit and Andrey II Prince of Novgorod three times, Grand Prince of Kiev since 1249	Rurikids	

After the death of Alexander Nevsky, the Grand Principality of Vladimir split into various appanage principalities, with Alexander's youngest son Daniel being the first permanent ruler of Moscow. The territory of Vladimir proper was received by the Horde to one of the appanage princes, who performed the enthronement ceremony in Vladimir, but remained to live and reign in his own principality. By the end of the century, only three cities – Moscow, Tver, and Nizhny Novgorod – still contended for the title of grand prince of Vladimir. The grand princely title occasionally reverted to Tver, but in the end, the Moscow branch of Rurikids established by Daniel successfully claimed the title for themselves exclusively.

Ivan I was able to collect tribute from the Russian princes to the Golden Horde and his reign saw a significant strengthening of Moscow as Ivan increased its wealth and purchased more land, including entire appanages from bankrupt princes. Ivan was also able to convince the head of the Russian Orthodox Church to move to Moscow, and Vladimir remained in the hands of the princes of Moscow. Ivan's son Simeon was the first prince to adopt the style of grand prince of Moscow and Vladimir.

The princes of Moscow and Suzdal entered a struggle for the grand princely title following the death of Ivan II, with Ivan's son Dmitry Ivanovich (later known as Dmitry Donskoy) taking the throne from Dmitry Konstantinovich in 1363. The Battle of Kulikovo in 1380 marked a turning point, with the prince of Moscow seen as the dominant prince.

Name	Lifespan	Reign start	Reign end	Notes	Family	Image
Yaroslav III: of Tver Ярослав Ярославич	1230–1272	1264	1271	Son of Yaroslav II and Fedosia Igorevna; Younger brother of Alexander Nevsky, Andrey II and Mikhail Khorobrit	Rurikids	
Vasily: of Kostroma Василий Ярославич	1241–1276	1272	January 1277	Son of Yaroslav II	Rurikids	
Dmitry: of Pereslavl Дмитрий Александрович	1250–1294	1277	1281	Son of Alexander Nevsky	Rurikids	
Andrey III: of Gorodets Андрей Александрович	1255–1304	1281	December 1283	Son of Alexander Nevsky; Younger brother of Dmitry of Pereslavl	Rurikids	
Dmitry: of Pereslavl Дмитрий Александрович	1250–1294	December 1283	1293	Restored	Rurikids	
Andrey III: of Gorodets Андрей Александрович	1255–1304	1293	27 July 1304	Restored	Rurikids	
Saint Mikhail: of Tver Михаил Ярославич (Михаил Тверской)	1271–1318	Autumn 1304	22 November 1318	Son of Yaroslav III and Xenia of Tarusa; Murdered	Rurikids	
Yuri III: of Moscow Юрий Данилович	1281–1325	1318	2 November 1322	Grandson of Alexander Nevsky	Rurikids	
Dmitry: the Fearsome Eyes; of Tver Дмитрий Михайлович (Грозные Очи)	1299–1326	1322	15 September 1326	Son of Michael of Tver and Anna of Kashin; Murdered	Rurikids	
Alexander: of Tver Александр Михайлович	1301–1339	1326	1327	Son of Michael of Tver and Anna of Kashin; Younger brother of Dmitry	Rurikids	
Alexander: of Suzdal Александр Васильевич	14th century	1328	1331	Grandson of Andrey II Co-ruler: Ivan I of Moscow	Rurikids	
Ivan I: Kalita (the Moneybag); of Moscow Иван Данилович (Иван Калита)	1288–1340	1328	31 March 1340	Grandson of Alexander Nevsky; Son of Daniel of Moscow; Younger brother of Yuri III Co-ruler: Alexander of Suzdal (until 1331)	Rurikids	
Simeon: the Proud; of Moscow Симеон Иванович (Симеон Гордый)	7 September 1317 – 27 April 1353	1 October 1340	27 April 1353	Son of Ivan I and Helena	Rurikids	
Ivan II: the Fair; of Moscow Иван Иванович (Иван Красный)	30 March 1326 – 13 November 1359	25 March 1354	13 November 1359	Son of Ivan I and Helena; Younger brother of Simeon	Rurikids	
Dmitry: of Suzdal Дмитрий Константинович	1322 – 5 July 1383	22 June 1360	December 1362	Son of Konstantin Vasilyevich of Suzdal	Rurikids	
Saint Dmitry: Donskoy; of Moscow Дмитрий Иванович (Дмитрий Донской)	12 October 1350 – 19 May 1389	January 1363	19 May 1389	Son of Ivan II and Alexandra Velyaminova; Prince of Moscow since 1359	Rurikids	

After the death of Dmitry Donskoy, the throne of Vladimir was passed to the prince of Moscow, thus usurping the right of the khan to appoint the grand prince. The grand princes of Moscow later adopted the title of sovereign and grand prince of all Russia, with the unification of other principalities with Moscow cultivating a sense of an imperial role for the grand prince as the ruler of all Russia.

=== Grand princes of Moscow ===
The Russians began to exert independence from the Mongols, culminating with Ivan III ceasing tribute to the Horde, effectively declaring his independence. Ivan III also greatly expanded his domain with the annexations of other principalities; his son Vasili III completed the task of uniting all of Russia by annexing the last few independent states in the 1520s.

Princely succession in medieval Russia proceeded along the lines of the eldest son usually being the being chosen, with the condition that substitution did not take place if the father died before the grandfather. The grand princes of Moscow, once they entrenched their status as the supreme prince with regard to other Russian princes, typically left a will in which they appointed their eldest son as heirs to the title of grand prince; this did not fully conform to traditional succession practices, and in 1497, Ivan III went one step further by crowning his grandson Dmitry as co-ruler, bypassing his son Vasily, who, according to the traditional system, would have been the heir, although in the end Vasily was made co-ruler and this arrangement did not work out. Ivan III also used the title of tsar in his foreign correspondence, but it would be his grandson Ivan IV who would be crowned as the first Russian tsar.

Name	Lifespan	Reign start	Reign end	Notes	Family	Image
Vasily I: Василий Дмитриевич	30 December 1371 – 27 February 1425	19 May 1389	27 February 1425	Son of Dmitry I and Eudoxia Dmitriyevna	Rurikids	
Vasily II: the Dark; Василий Васильевич (Василий Тёмный)	10 March 1415 – 27 March 1462	27 February 1425	30 March 1434	Son of Vasily I and Sophia of Lithuania. Deposed Regent: Sophia of Lithuania (1425–1432)	Rurikids	
Yuri (IV): of Zvenigorod Юрий Дмитриевич	26 November 1374 – 5 June 1434	31 March 1434	5 June 1434	Son of Dmitry I and Eudoxia Dmitriyevna; Younger brother of Vasily I	Rurikids	
Vasily: the Squint; of Zvenigorod Василий Юрьевич (Василий Косой)	1421 – 1448	5 June 1434	1435	Son of Yury of Zvenigorod and Anastasia of Smolensk	Rurikids	
Vasily II: the Dark; Василий Васильевич (Василий Тёмный)	10 March 1415 – 27 March 1462	1435	1446	Restored	Rurikids	
Dmitry: Shemyaka; Дмитрий Юрьевич (Дмитрий Шемяка)	1400s – 17 July 1453	1446	26 March 1447	Son of Yury of Zvenigorod and Anastasia of Smolensk, brother of Vasily the Squint; First to use the title of Sovereign of all Russia	Rurikids	
Vasily II: the Dark; Василий Васильевич (Василий Тёмный)	10 March 1415 – 27 March 1462	27 February 1447	27 March 1462	Restored Co-ruler: Ivan (since 1449)	Rurikids	
Ivan III: the Great; Иван Васильевич (Иван Великий)	22 January 1440 – 6 November 1505	5 April 1462	6 November 1505	Son of Vasily II and Maria of Borovsk Co-rulers: Ivan the Young (1471–1490), Dmitry the Grandson (1498–1502), Vasily (since 1502)	Rurikids	
Vasily III: Василий Иванович	25 March 1479 – 13 December 1533	6 November 1505	13 December 1533	Son of Ivan III and Sophia Paleologue	Rurikids	
Ivan IV: the Terrible; Иван Васильевич	25 August 1530 – 28 March 1584	13 December 1533	26 January 1547	Son of Vasily III and Elena Glinskaya Regent: Elena Glinskaya (1533–1538)	Rurikids	

=== Tsars of Russia ===
Ivan IV ("the Terrible") assumed the title of tsar in 1547. Succession was treated in an unorthodox manner under Ivan IV, who, in 1575, formally transferred his powers to Simeon Bekbulatovich, a Tatar prince who had been baptized and given his own principality; Ivan returned to the throne the following year. Ivan was succeeded in 1584 by his only surviving son, Feodor, who died without an heir, marking the end of the Rurik dynasty.

Name	Lifespan	Reign start	Reign end	Notes	Family	Image
Ivan IV: the Terrible; Иван Васильевич (Иван Грозный)	25 August 1530 – 28 March 1584	26 January 1547	28 March 1584	Son of Vasily III and Elena Glinskaya "Grand Prince": Simeon Bekbulatovich (1575–1576)	Rurikids	
Feodor I: the Blessed; Фёдор Иванович (Фёдор Блаженный)	31 May 1557 – 17 January 1598	28 March 1584	17 January 1598	Son of Ivan IV and Anastasia Zakharyina-Yuryeva	Rurikids	

== Time of Troubles (1598–1613) ==
=== Tsars of Russia ===
In 1581, Ivan the Terrible killed his firstborn son Ivan Ivanovich in a fit of rage, leaving only Feodor I to succeed him. Feodor died childless, marking the end of the Rurik dynasty and the start of a succession crisis during a period known as the Time of Troubles. The first non-Rurikid tsar was Feodor's brother-in-law and regent, the influent boyar Boris Godunov, elected by the Zemsky Sobor (feudal parliament).

Name	Lifespan	Reign start	Reign end	Notes	Family	Image
Irina (disputed): Ирина Фёдоровна Годунова	1557 – 27 October 1603	17 January [O.S. 7 January] 1598	3 March [O.S. 21 February] 1598	Wife of Feodor I	Godunov	
Boris: Борис Фёдорович Годунов	2 August 1552 – 13 April 1605	3 March [O.S. 21 February] 1598	23 April [O.S. 13 April] 1605	Brother-in-law of Feodor I Elected by Zemsky Sobor	Godunov	
Feodor II: Фёдор Борисович Годунов	1589 – 20 June 1605	23 April [O.S. 13 April] 1605	20 June [O.S. 10 June] 1605	Son of Boris Godunov and Maria Grigorievna Skuratova-Belskaya; Murdered	Godunov	

Devastated by famine, rule under Boris descended into anarchy. There followed a series of impostors, known as the False Dmitrys, each claiming to be Feodor I's long deceased younger brother; however, only the first impostor ever took the capital and sat on the throne. A distant Rurikid cousin, Vasily Shuysky, also took power for a time. During this period foreign powers deeply involved themselves in Russian politics, under the leadership of the Vasa monarchs of Sweden and Poland-Lithuania, including Sigismund III Vasa and his son Władysław. As a child, Władysław was even chosen as tsar by the council of aristocracy, though he was prevented by his father from formally taking the throne. The Time of Troubles is considered to have ended with the election of Michael Romanov to the throne in February 1613, thereby establishing the Romanov dynasty.

Name	Lifespan	Reign start	Reign end	Notes	Family	Image
False Dmitry I: Лжедмитрий I	1581 – 17 May 1606	20 June [O.S. 10 June] 1605	27 May [O.S. 17 May] 1606	Claiming to be son of Ivan IV, he was the only impostor to actually sit on the throne of a major power. Backed by Polish–Lithuanian Commonwealth. Murdered.	Rurikids (claimed)	
Vasily IV: Василий Иванович Шуйский	22 September 1552 – 12 September 1612	19 May 1606	17 July 1610	Orchestrated a conspiracy against False Dmitry, proclaimed tsar by the nobles. Deposed and sent to Poland Pretender: False Dmitry II (since June 1607)	Shuysky	
Vladislav: Владислав Жигимонтович	9 June 1595 – 20 May 1648	6 September 1610	November 1612 (resigned his claim in 1634)	King of Poland and Grand Duke of Lithuania from 1632 to 1648; Son of Sigismund III Vasa and Anne of Austria; Elected by the Seven Boyars, never assumed the throne Pretenders: False Dmitry II (until 21 December 1610), False Dmitry III (July 1611 – May 1612)	Vasa	

== Romanovs (1613–1917) ==
=== Tsars of Russia ===
The Time of Troubles came to a close with the election of Michael Romanov as tsar in 1613. Tsar Mikhail's father Patriarch Filaret of Moscow was descended from the Rurik dynasty through the female line. His mother, Evdokiya Gorbataya-Shuyskaya, was a Rurikid princess from the Shuysky branch, daughter of Alexander Gorbatyi-Shuisky. Michael officially reigned as tsar, though his father, Patriarch Philaret, held de facto power until his death in 1633. However, Michael's descendants would rule Russia, first as tsars and later as emperors, until the Russian Revolution of 1917. Michael was succeeded by his only son, Alexis, who in turn was succeeded by his eldest son of his first marriage, Feodor.

Following the death of Feodor, there were two candidates for the throne: his brother Ivan and his half-brother Peter, who were fifteen and nine years old, respectively. Each candidate was supported by a competing clan, the Miloslavskys and Naryshkins. At first, the throne was given to Peter, but as a result of the streltsy uprising in Moscow, a compromise solution was found and both Peter and Ivan were made co-monarchs in 1682, with Ivan's older sister Sophia ruling as regent. Ivan was considered the senior tsar and Peter the junior tsar; however, due to Ivan being considered unfit for the role, Peter was able to remove his half-sister Sophia from power and take control of the throne at the age of 17 with the assistance of another streltsy uprising in 1689. Peter then became the sole monarch in 1696 upon the death of Ivan.

Name	Lifespan	Reign start	Reign end	Notes	Family	Image
Michael: Михаил Фёдорович	12 July 1596 – 12 July 1645	26 July 1613	12 July 1645	Founder of Romanov dynasty First cousin once removed of Feodor I Co-ruler: Patriarch Filaret (1619–1633)	Romanov (by birth); Rurikid ancestry (through his father's mother)	
Alexis: the Quietest; Алексей Михайлович (Алексей Тишайший)	9 May 1629 – 29 January 1676	12 July 1645	29 January 1676	Son of Michael and Eudoxia Streshneva	Romanov	
Feodor III: Фёдор III Алексеевич	9 June 1661 – 7 May 1682	29 January 1676	7 May 1682	Son of Alexis and Maria Miloslavskaya	Romanov	
Ivan V: Иван V Алексеевич	6 September 1666 – 8 February 1696	7 May 1682	8 February 1696	Son of Alexis and Maria Miloslavskaya; Younger brother of Feodor III and Sophia; Elder half-brother of Peter I Co-ruler: Peter I Regent: princess Sophia (8 June 1682 – 17 September 1689)	Romanov	
Peter I: Пётр I Алексеевич	9 June 1672 – 8 February 1725	7 May 1682	2 November 1721	Son of Alexis and Natalya Naryshkina; Younger half-brother of Feodor III Co-ruler: Ivan V (7 May 1682 – 8 February 1696); Regent: tsaritsa dowager Natalia (7 May – 2 June 1682), princess Sophia (8 June 1682 – 17 September 1689)	Romanov	

=== Emperors of Russia ===
The Russian Empire was proclaimed by Peter the Great in 1721 following the creation of the imperial title in the aftermath of the Great Northern War. Russia's territorial gains and increased standing as a key player on the European scene allowed it to upgrade its official status from tsardom to empire. The full imperial title proposed in 1721 to Peter was "Father of the Fatherland, Peter the Great, All-Russian Emperor". At his accession as the sole monarch of Russia in 1696, Peter held the same title as his father, Alexis: "Great Lord Tsar and Grand Prince, Autocrat of Great, Small and White Russia". By 1710, he had styled himself as "Tsar and All-Russian Emperor", but it was not until 1721 that the imperial title became official. The adjective "All-Russian" had been increasingly used to refer to the territories of modern-day Belarus and Ukraine as well.

Peter issued a decree in 1722 in which the sovereign would be free to appoint a successor, referring to a number of historical precedents, including the conduct of Ivan III, who initially chose his grandson as his successor. This was later detailed in Pravda voli Monarshei v opredelenii Naslednika Derzhavy Sovei ("The righteousness of the monarch's will in appointing the successor in his reign"), a major political treatise written in its defense, which was only circulated widely following Peter's death, and argued on the basis of an abundance of examples from both biblical and secular history that it was fully correct for a ruler to appoint his own successor without being bound by traditional family succession rules. Peter died in 1725 without naming a successor.

Officially, Russia would be ruled by the Romanov dynasty until the Russian Revolution of 1917. However, direct male descendants of Michael Romanov came to an end in 1730 with the death of Peter II of Russia, grandson of Peter the Great. The throne passed to Anna, a niece of Peter the Great, and after the brief rule of her niece's infant son Ivan VI, the throne was seized by Elizabeth, a daughter of Peter the Great. Elizabeth would be the last of the direct Romanovs to rule Russia. Elizabeth declared her nephew, Peter, to be her heir. Peter, who would rule as Peter III, was a German prince (with Romanov ancestry on his mother's side) of the House of Holstein-Gottorp before arriving in Russia to assume the imperial title. He and his German wife Sophia (who had distant Rurikid ancestry) changed their name to Romanov upon inheriting the throne. Peter was ill-liked, and he was assassinated within six months of assuming the throne, in a coup orchestrated by his wife, who became Empress in her own right and ruled as Catherine the Great. Their son, Paul I established clear succession laws which governed the rules of primogeniture over the imperial throne due to the confused successions of the descendants of Peter the Great. These laws were held until the fall of the Russian Empire in 1917.

Name	Lifespan	Reign start	Reign end	Notes	Family	Image
Peter I: the Great; Пётр I Алексеевич (Пётр Великий)	9 June 1672 – 8 February 1725	2 November 1721	8 February 1725	Son of Alexis and Natalya Naryshkina; Younger half-brother of Feodor III, Sophia and Ivan V Regarded as one of the greatest Russian monarchs. Cause of death: Prostate disease	Romanov	
Catherine I: Екатерина I Алексеевна	15 April 1684 – 17 May 1727	8 February 1725	17 May 1727	Second wife of Peter I Cause of death: Lung abscess	Skavronsky (by birth); Romanov (by marriage)	
Peter II: Пётр II Алексеевич	23 October 1715 – 30 January 1730	18 May 1727	30 January 1730	Grandson of Peter I via the murdered Tsesarevich Alexei; Last male of the direct Romanov line Cause of death: Smallpox	Romanov	
Anna: Анна Иоанновна	7 February 1693 – 28 October 1740	13 February 1730	28 October 1740	Daughter of Ivan V and Praskovia Saltykova; Cause of death: Chronic kidney disease	Romanov	
Ivan VI: Иван VI Антонович	23 August 1740 – 16 July 1764	28 October 1740	6 December 1741	Great-grandson of Ivan V Deposed as a baby, imprisoned and later murdered Regents: E. J. von Biron (until 20 November 1740), Anna Leopoldovna (since 20 November 1740); Cause of death: Assassination	Mecklenburg-Brunswick-Romanov	
Elizabeth: Елизавета Петровна	29 December 1709 – 5 January 1762	6 December 1741	5 January 1762	Daughter of Peter I and Catherine I Cause of death: Stroke	Romanov	
Peter III: Пётр III Фёдорович	21 February 1728 – 17 July 1762	5 January 1762	9 July 1762	Grandson of Peter I via his daughter Anna Petrovna; Nephew of Elizabeth; Deposed and later murdered Cause of death: Assassination	Holstein-Gottorp-Romanov	
Catherine II: the Great; Екатерина II Алексеевна (Екатерина Великая)	2 May 1729 – 17 November 1796	9 July 1762	17 November 1796	Wife of Peter III; Niece-in-law of Elizabeth of Russia; Cause of death: Stroke	Ascania (by birth); Holstein-Gottorp-Romanov (by marriage); Rurikids (distant ancestry)	
Paul I: Павел I Петрович	1 October 1754 – 23 March 1801	17 November 1796	23 March 1801	Son of Peter III and Catherine II; Cause of death: Assassination	Holstein-Gottorp-Romanov	
Alexander I: the Blessed; Александр I Павлович (Александр Благословенный)	23 December 1777 – 1 December 1825	23 March 1801	1 December 1825	Son of Paul I and Maria Feodorovna; First Romanov King of Poland and Grand Duke of Finland; Cause of death: Typhus fever	Holstein-Gottorp-Romanov	
Nicholas I: Николай I Павлович	6 July 1796 – 2 March 1855	1 December 1825	2 March 1855	Son of Paul I and Maria Feodorovna; Cause of death: Pneumonia	Holstein-Gottorp-Romanov	
Alexander II: the Liberator; Александр II Николаевич (Александр Освободитель)	29 April 1818 – 13 March 1881	2 March 1855	13 March 1881	Son of Nicholas I and Alexandra Feodrovna; Nephew of Alexander I Cause of death: Assassinated	Holstein-Gottorp-Romanov	
Alexander III: the Peacemaker; Александр III Александрович (Александр Миротворец)	10 March 1845 – 1 November 1894	13 March 1881	1 November 1894	Son of Alexander II and Maria Alexandrovna; Cause of death: Kidney disease	Holstein-Gottorp-Romanov	
Saint Nicholas II: Николай II Александрович	18 May 1868 – 17 July 1918	1 November 1894	15 March 1917	Son of Alexander III and Maria Feodorovna; Abdicated the throne during the February Revolution; Cause of death: Assassination (Murdered by the Bolsheviks)	Holstein-Gottorp-Romanov	

=== Pretenders after Nicholas II ===
Name	Lifespan	Reign start	Reign end	Notes	Family	Image
Michael Aleksandrovich: Михаил Александрович	4 December 1878 – 13 June 1918	15 March 1917	16 March 1917	Younger brother of Nicholas II; Abdicated after a nominal reign of only 18 hours, ending dynastic rule in Russia; He is not usually recognised as an emperor, as Russian law did not allow Nicholas II to disinherit his son	Holstein-Gottorp-Romanov	
Nicholas Nikolaevich: Николай Николаевич	6 November 1856 – 5 January 1929	July 1922	16 June 1923	Grandson of Nicholas I Proclaimed Emperor of Russia by the Zemsky Sobor of the Provisional Priamurye Government while being in exile His nominal rule came to an end when the areas controlled by the Provisional Priamurye Government were overrun by the communists	Holstein-Gottorp-Romanov	
Kirill Vladimirovich "Cyril I": Кирилл Владимирович	30 September 1876 – 12 October 1938	31 August 1924	12 October 1938	Grandson of Alexander II; Claimed the title Emperor of All the Russias while in exile Recognised by a congress of legitimists delegates in Paris in 1926	Holstein-Gottorp-Romanov	

The rights of Kirill Vladimirovich and his heirs to the imperial throne of Russia have been repeatedly questioned following his marriage with Princess Victoria Melita of Saxe-Coburg and Gotha. The principles laid down by Paul I in the Act of Succession 1797 turned out to be not completely flawlessly formulated, and, as a result, the interpretation of these is not always obvious, and Russia now has no indisputable contender for the throne. Moreover, for more than a hundred years the throne itself has ceased to exist. Nevertheless, when in 1915 Nicholas II, before the lack of successible grand dukes, allowed them to retain their personal rights, as it had happened in practice with Alexander II after his second and morganatic marriage, Kirill Vladimirovich's issue was never deemed to be considered morganatic, nor were they demoted from grand dukes to mere princes.

== See also ==
- Family tree of Russian monarchs
- List of Russian royal consorts
- List of heads of state of Russia (1917–present)
  - List of leaders of the Russian SFSR (1917–1991)
  - List of leaders of the Soviet Union (1922–1991)
  - List of presidents of Russia (1991–present)
- List of heads of government of Russia
  - Prime Minister of Russia
  - Premier of the Soviet Union
- Tsarist autocracy

== Sources ==
- Anderson, Matthew Smith (1998). The Origins of the Modern European State System, 1494-1618. Longman. ISBN 978-0-582-22945-7.
- Blaustein, Albert P.; Sigler, Jay A. (1988). Constitutions that Made History. Paragon House Publishers. ISBN 978-0-913729-67-0.
- Borrero, Mauricio (2009). Russia: A Reference Guide from the Renaissance to the Present. Infobase Publishing. ISBN 978-0-8160-7475-4.
- Brink, Stefan; Price, Neil (31 October 2008). The Viking World. Routledge. ISBN 978-1-134-31826-1.
- Burbank, Jane; Ransel, David L. (22 September 1998). Imperial Russia: New Histories for the Empire. Indiana University Press. ISBN 978-0-253-21241-2.
- Cracraft, James (30 June 2009). The Revolution of Peter the Great. Harvard University Press. ISBN 978-0-674-02994-1.
- Crummey, Robert O. (6 June 2014) [1987]. The Formation of Muscovy 1300–1613. Routledge. ISBN 978-1-317-87200-9.
- Curtis, Glenn E. (1996). Russia: A Country Study. Library of Congress. ISBN 0844408662.
- Feldbrugge, Ferdinand Joseph Maria (2009). Law in Medieval Russia. BRILL. ISBN 978-90-04-16985-2.
- Feldbrugge, Ferdinand J. M. (2 October 2017). A History of Russian Law: From Ancient Times to the Council Code (Ulozhenie) of Tsar Aleksei Mikhailovich of 1649. BRILL. ISBN 978-90-04-35214-8.
- Fennell, John L. I. (14 January 2014) [1995]. A History of the Russian Church to 1488. Routledge. ISBN 978-1-317-89720-0.
- Fennell, John L. I. (15 November 2023) [1968]. The Emergence of Moscow, 1304–1359. University of California Press. ISBN 978-0-520-34759-5.
- Filyushkin, A. (2006). Титулы русских государей [Titles of Russian sovereigns]. Moscow: Альянс-Архео. ISBN 9785988740117.
- Gleason, Abbott (28 January 2014). A Companion to Russian History. John Wiley & Sons. ISBN 978-1-118-73000-3.
- Hartog, Leo de (1996). Russia and the Mongol Yoke: The History of the Russian Principalities and the Golden Horde, 1221-1502. British Academic Press. ISBN 978-1-85043-961-5.
- Kort, Michael (2008). A Brief History of Russia. Infobase Publishing. ISBN 978-1-4381-0829-2.
- Langer, Lawrence N. (15 September 2021). Historical Dictionary of Medieval Russia. Rowman & Littlefield. ISBN 978-1-5381-1942-6.
- Madariaga, Isabel De (17 June 2014). Politics and Culture in Eighteenth-Century Russia: Collected Essays by Isabel de Madariaga. Routledge. ISBN 978-1-317-88190-2.
- Magill, Frank Northen; Aves, Alison (1998). Dictionary of World Biography: The Middle Ages. Routledge. ISBN 978-1-57958-041-4.
- Middleton, John (1 June 2015). World Monarchies and Dynasties. Routledge. ISBN 978-1-317-45158-7.
- Montefiore, Simon Sebag (2016). The Romanovs: 1613–1918. Alfred A. Knopf. ISBN 978-0-307-26652-1.
- Morby, John E. (2002). "Russia". Dynasties of the World: A Chronological and Genealogical Handbook. Oxford University Press. pp. 167–170. ISBN 978-0-19-172641-5.
- Pushkareva, Natalia (1997). Women in Russian History: From the Tenth to the Twentieth Century. M.E. Sharpe. ISBN 978-0-7656-3270-8.
- Ring, Trudy; Watson, Noelle; Schellinger, Paul (28 October 2013). Northern Europe: International Dictionary of Historic Places. Routledge. ISBN 978-1-136-63944-9.
- Shain, Yossi (3 March 2005). The Frontier of Loyalty: Political Exiles in the Age of the Nation-State. University of Michigan Press. ISBN 978-0-472-03042-2.
