= Church of the Nativity of the Theotokos on Mikhalitsa =

- Церковь Рождества Богородицы на Михалице
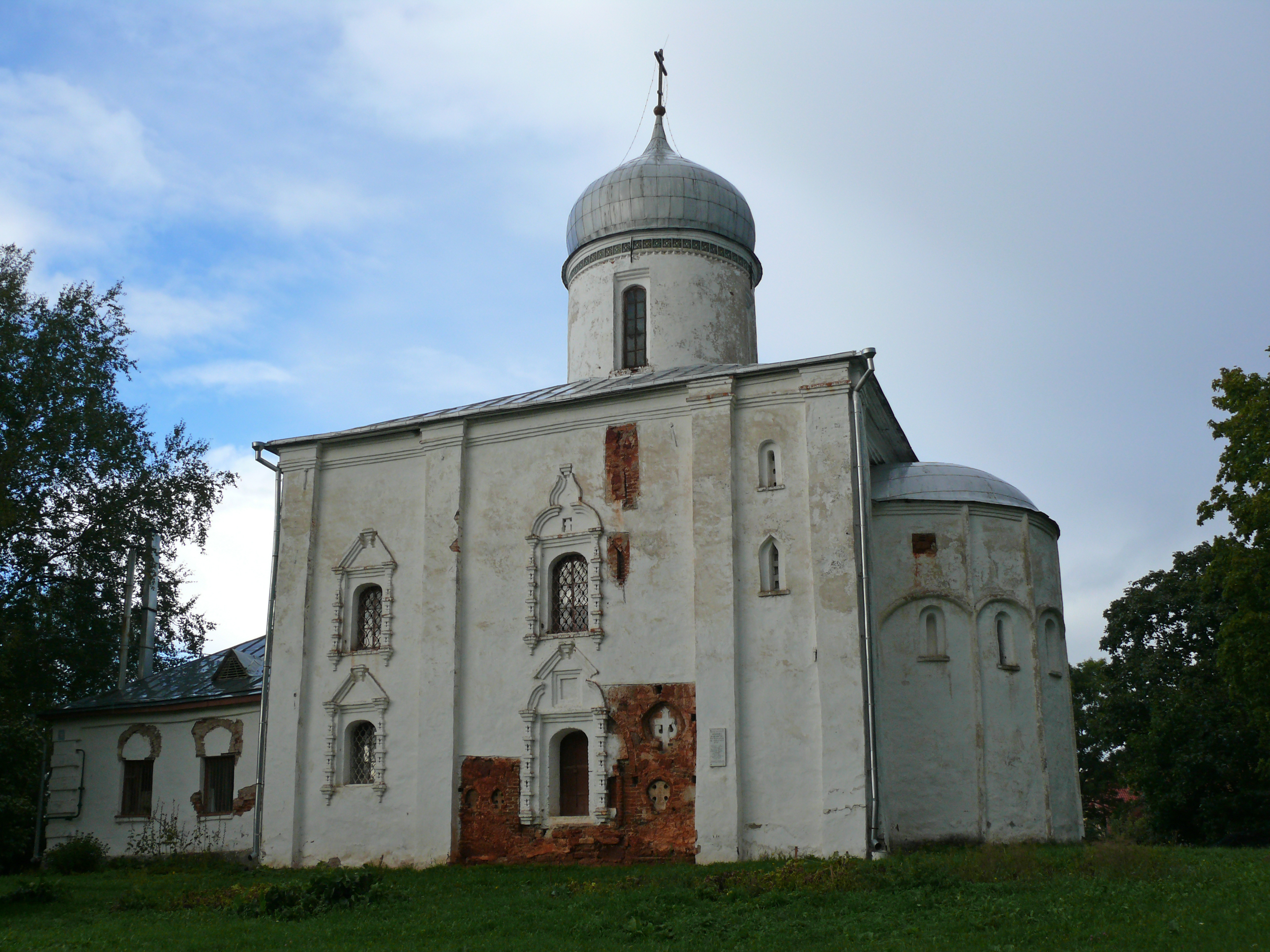
- Church of the Nativity of the Theotokos on Mikhalitsa
- 58°31′30.81″N 31°17′51.32″E
- Location: Veliky Novgorod
- Country: Russia
- Denomination: Eastern Orthodox

History
- Status: Parish church
- Dedication: Nativity of the Theotokos

Architecture
- Functional status: Active
- Completed: 1379

Administration
- Division: Patriarchate of Moscow and All Russia

The Church of the Nativity of the Theotokos on Mikhalitsa (Russian: Церковь Рождества Богородицы на Михалице, romanized: Tserkov Rozhdestva Bogoroditsy na Mikhalitse) is a Russian Orthodox church in Veliky Novgorod, Russia, built in 1379 in place of a wooden church. It is located on the Molotkovskaya Street

== History ==
The Novgorod First Chronicle mentions the construction of the church on Mikhalitsa in 1199 by Rostislava Mstislavna, the second wife of Yaroslav II of Vladimir. The masonry church was erected in place of the burned wooden one. The origin of the placename "Mikhalitsa" is unsure.

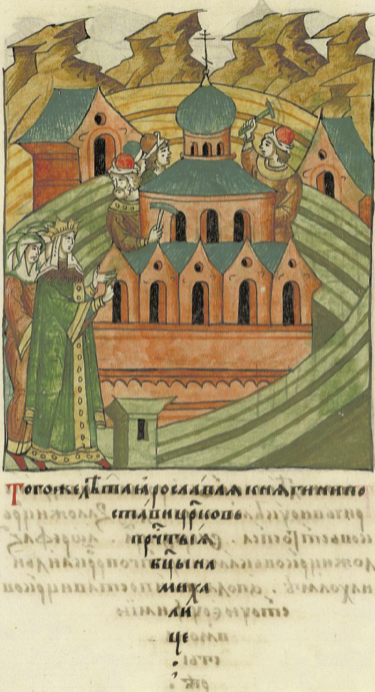
Construction of the church by Rostislava (Illustrated Chronicle of Ivan the Terrible)
