= Rostislav of Kiev =

Rostislav of Kiev may refer to:

- Rostislav I of Kiev (c.1110-1167)
- Rostislav II of Kiev (1173 - before 1214)
- Rostislav III of Kiev (1225-62), Ban of Slavonia and Machva
