= Mstislav Mstislavich =

Rus' prince (died c. 1228)

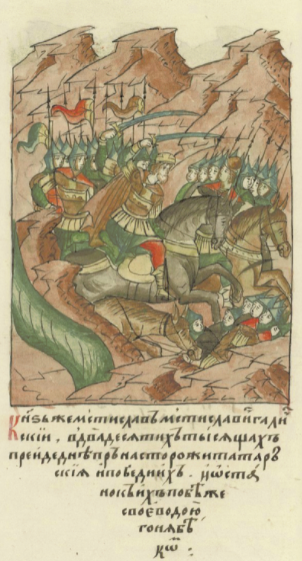
Mstislav on horseback during the battle, miniature from the Illustrated Chronicle of Ivan the Terrible (16th century)

Mstislav Mstislavich, also called the Daring, the Bold or the Able (Note: Russian: Мстисла́в II Мстисла́вич Удатный, Ukrainian: Мстислав Мстиславич Удатний, romanized: Mstyslav Mstyslavych Udatnyi) (died c. 1228), was a prince of Tmutarakan and Chernigov. He was one of the princes from Kievan Rus' in the decades preceding the Mongol invasions.

== Biography ==
Mstislav Mstislavich was the son of Mstislav Rostislavich ("the Brave") of Smolensk by a princess of Ryazan; his grandfather was Rostislav I of Kiev. In 1193 and 1203, Mstislav was commended for his bravery in the Kipchak wars, bringing him fame all over Kievan Rus'. At that time, he married Maria, a daughter of the Kipchak Khan Kotyan. In 1209, he was mentioned as a ruler of Toropets. A year later, he came and took the Novgorodian throne, seizing Sviatoslav Vsevolodovich's men (Sviatoslav himself was detained in the archbishop's compound in Novgorod).

On his way to Novgorod, Mstislav delivered the key town of Torzhok from a siege laid to it by Vsevolod III of Vladimir. He led two successful Novgorodian campaigns against the Chudes in 1212 and 1214. In 1215, he expelled Vsevolod IV from Kiev and elevated his uncle Mstislav Romanovich to the throne.

In 1216, Mstislav mustered a large coalition of princes of Rus' which defeated Vladimir-Suzdal in the Battle of Lipitsa. After that, he installed his ally Konstantin of Rostov as Grand Prince of Vladimir and married his own daughter to Yaroslav of Suzdal, who had fortified himself in Torzhok. In the meantime, his other enemies had him deposed in Novgorod, and Mstislav had to abandon northern Rus' for Galicia. In 1219, he concluded peace with his chief rival, Daniel of Galicia, who thereupon married Mstislav's daughter Anna.

In 1223, Mstislav joined a coalition of perhaps 18 princes, which, along with Cuman (Polovtsian) allies, pursued the Mongols from the Dnieper River for nine days and joined battle with them at the Kalka River. While three princes were captured and later killed at the battle site, and six more were killed in headlong pursuit back to the Dnieper River, Mstislav is the only prince specifically named among the nine or so who escaped. He managed to escape by cutting loose the boats on the Dnieper River so he could not be pursued.

During the interventions carried out by Leszek the White in the Kingdom of Galicia-Volhynia he took part in the Polish-Hungarian-Ruthenian War of 1219—1221, but suffered defeat in the Polish-Ruthenian War (1224), where Leszek's forces defeated him in battle.

Mstislav reigned in Galicia until 1227, when boyar intrigues constrained him to leave the city to his son-in-law, Andrew of Hungary. Thereupon he retired to Torchesk, where he died in 1228.

== Family ==
He was the maternal grandfather of Prince Alexander Nevsky, Prince of Novgorod, Grand Prince of Kiev and Grand Prince of Vladimir. He also was the maternal grandfather of prince Leo I of Galicia, who became Grand Prince of Kiev.

He married a daughter of Kotyan and had issue:

- Rostislava Mstislavna, wife of Yaroslav II of Vladimir.
- Anna, wife of Daniel of Galicia.
- Maria, wife of Andrew of Hungary, Prince of Galicia (after 1222).

== Sources ==
- Włodarski, Bronisław (1927), Polityka ruska Leszka białego, vol. III, Lviv: Biblioteka Uniwersytecka w Poznaniu
- Katchanovski, Ivan; Kohut, Zenon E.; Nesebio, Bohdan Y.; Yurkevich, Myroslav (2013). Historical Dictionary of Ukraine. Lanham, Maryland; Toronto; Plymouth: Scarecrow Press. p. 992. ISBN 9780810878471.

Mstislav Mstislavich Rostislavichi of Smolensk Born: ? Died: 1228
Regnal titles
Preceded by Sviatoslav Vsevolodovich	Prince of Novgorod; 1210–1215	Succeeded by Yaroslav Vsevolodovich
Unknown	Prince of Halych; 1219–1227	Succeeded by Andrew of Hungary
