= Sviatoslav Vsevolodovich =

Sviatoslav Vsevolodovich may refer to:

- Sviatoslav III of Kiev, Prince of Chernihiv and Grand Prince of Kiev
- Sviatoslav Vsevolodovich of Vladimir, Grand Prince of Vladimir
