= Verkhuslava of Kiev =

Grand Princess of the Kiev in 1189-1222; daughter of Vsevolod the Big Nest

Verkhuslava Vsevolodovna
- Died: 1222
- Spouse: Rostislav II of Kiev
- Issue: Euphrosyne
- Father: Vsevolod the Big Nest
- Mother: Maria Shvarnovna

Verkhuslava Vsevolodovna (Ukrainian: Верхуслава-Антонія Всеволодівна, romanized: Verkhuslava-Antoniya Vsevolodivna) (1180/1181–1222), was a Grand Princess of the Kiev by marriage to Rostislav II of Kiev, Grand Prince of Kiev (r. 1204–1206).

== Biography ==
Verkhuslava was the daughter of Maria Shvarnovna and Vsevolod the Big Nest, growing up in Suzdal. According to the Kievan Chronicle, which provides an unusual amount of details on her wedding on 8 May 1189 in Belgorod (modern Bilhorod Kyivskyi), she was only 8 years old when she was married off to 16-year-old Rostislav. (For comparison, her older brother Konstantin of Rostov was apparently married off at age 9).

After the death of her spouse, she participated in church politics, and it is noted that she supported different candidates for the appointments of Bishoprics financially.

== Literature ==
- Raffensperger, Christian; Ostrowski, Donald (2023). The Ruling Families of Rus: Clan, Family and Kingdom. London: Reaktion Books. p. 309. ISBN 978-1-78914-745-2. (e-book)
