= Konstantin I =

Konstantin I may refer to:

- Konstantin of Rostov (1186–1218)
- Konstantin I of Bulgaria (ruled 1257–1277)
