= Rostislav II of Kiev =

Grand Prince of Kiev from 1204 to 1206

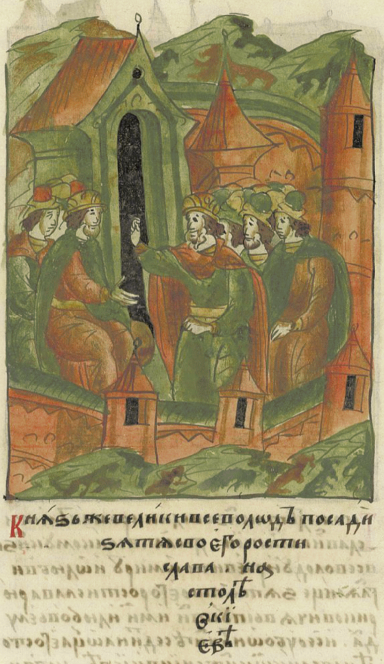
Enthronement of Rostislav, miniature from the Illustrated Chronicle of Ivan the Terrible (16th century)

Rostislav Rurikovich (Note: Russian: Ростислав Рюрикович; Ukrainian: Ростислав Рюрикович, romanized: Rostyslav Riurykovych.) (1173 – before 1214) was Prince of Torchesk (1195–1205), Grand Prince of Kiev (1204–1206), Prince of Vyshgorod (1205–1210), and Prince of Galicia (1207). He was a son of Rurik Rostislavich and Anna II of Kiev. In 1189, the 16-year-old Rostislav was married off to 8-year-old Verkhuslava, daughter of Vsevolod the Big Nest and Maria Shvarnovna of Vladimir-Suzdal.

== Literature ==
- Raffensperger, Christian; Ostrowski, Donald (2023). The Ruling Families of Rus: Clan, Family and Kingdom. London: Reaktion Books. p. 309. ISBN 978-1-78914-745-2. (e-book)

Preceded by Roman II	Grand Prince of Kiev	Succeeded by Vsevolod IV
