= Yuri II of Vladimir =

- Grand Prince of Vladimir
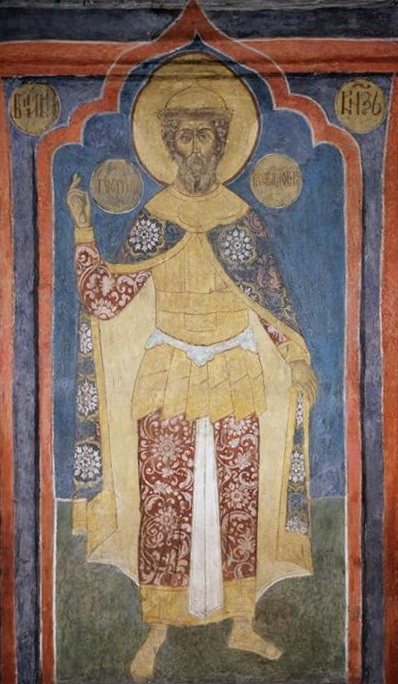
- 17th-century fresco in the Archangel Cathedral of the Moscow Kremlin
- Reign: 1212–1216, 1218–1238
- Predecessor: Vsevolod the Big Nest
- Successor: Konstantin of Rostov
- Predecessor: Konstantin of Rostov
- Successor: Yaroslav II of Vladimir
- Born: 26 November 1188; Suzdal
- Died: 4 March 1238 (aged 49); Battle of the Sit River
- Burial: Dormition Cathedral, Vladimir
- Spouse: Agatha (daughter of Vsevolod IV of Kiev)
- Issue: Vsevolod; Mstislav; Vladimir; Dobrava; Theodora
- House: Yurievichi
- Father: Vsevolod the Big Nest
- Mother: Maria Shvarnovna
- Religion: Eastern Orthodoxy

Yuri II (Russian: Ю́рий–II, also transcribed as Iuri), also known as George II of Vladimir, or Georgy II Vsevolodovich (26 November 1188 – 4 March 1238), was the fourth Grand Prince of Vladimir (1212–1216, 1218–1238) who presided over the Principality of Vladimir-Suzdal at the time of the Mongol invasion of Kievan Rus'.

The third son of Vsevolod III and Maria Shvarnovna, Yuri II was the founder of Nizhny Novgorod and is venerated as a saint in the Russian Orthodox Church.

== Early life ==
Yuri was born in Suzdal on 26 November 1188. On 28 July 1192, he undertook the knightly tonsure in Suzdal, a rite of passage that marked him as a warrior, and was placed on a horse for the first time.

He first distinguished himself in battles against the Principality of Ryazan in 1207. In the winter of 1208–1209, he campaigned against Torzhok alongside his brother Konstantin, and in early 1209 he fought against Ryazan forces that had attacked the outskirts of Moscow. In 1211, Yuri married Agafia, daughter of Vsevolod Svyatoslavich Chermny, Prince of Chernigov. The wedding took place in Vladimir's Cathedral of the Dormition.

In 1211, Yuri's father Vsevolod the Big Nest chose him to inherit the throne of Vladimir, bypassing the traditional rights of his eldest son, Konstantin. Vsevolod convened a council of boyars and clergy to legitimize his decision.

After Vsevolod's death in 1212, the Vladimir-Suzdal war of succession (1212–1216) broke out between the brothers. Konstantin allied himself with Mstislav the Bold of Novgorod, while Yuri was supported by his brother Yaroslav. In a decisive battle on the Lipitsa River in April 1216, Konstantin and his allies defeated the forces of Yuri and Yaroslav. Having lost Vladimir, Yuri was sent to rule the provincial town of Gorodets Radilov on the Volga. However, two years later, Konstantin died, and Yuri was allowed to return to Vladimir as Grand Prince, having been designated by Konstantin as his successor.

== Reign ==
=== Foreign policy ===
Yuri II conducted an active foreign policy, largely seeking to expand Vladimir's influence while avoiding major military conflicts. Between 1220 and 1234, his forces, often in alliance with Novgorod, Ryazan, and even Lithuanian troops, undertook 14 campaigns. The only three of these to result in battle were victorious.

A primary concern was the Volga Bulgars. In 1220, Yuri sent a large army under his brother Svyatoslav, which sacked the Bulgar city of Oshel on the Volga. The same year, forces from Rostov and Ustyug raided Bulgar lands along the Kama River. The Bulgars sued for peace, but Yuri refused. In 1221, Yuri planned a new campaign and marched to Gorodets. After rejecting a second peace offer, he finally accepted a treaty after a third Bulgar embassy arrived with rich gifts. To secure the confluence of the Volga and Oka, a strategic point for controlling trade and defence against Bulgar raids, Yuri founded the fortress of Nizhny Novgorod in 1221. He dedicated a church there to the Archangel Michael.

The foundation of Nizhny Novgorod led to conflicts with the neighbouring Mordvins. Vladimir's forces launched campaigns against them in 1226, 1228, 1229, and 1232, suppressing opposition to Vladimir's expansion.

Yuri also intervened in the affairs of other Rus' principalities and the Baltics. When the Mongols first approached in 1223, he sent a detachment under his nephew Vasilko to aid the southern princes, but it arrived in Chernigov too late to participate in the disastrous Battle of the Kalka River. In 1222 and 1223, he sent troops to assist the Estonians in their uprising against the Livonian Brothers of the Sword. A subsequent conflict with Novgorod in 1224, however, cost the Rus' their last stronghold in the Baltics, Yuryev (Tartu), which was captured by the Germans.

=== Mongol invasion and death ===
In the winter of 1237, the Mongol army led by Batu Khan invaded the Principality of Ryazan. The princes of Ryazan appealed to Yuri for aid, but he was hesitant to commit his forces. According to some chronicles, he treated the Mongol envoys who arrived in Vladimir with disdain. He sent his son Vsevolod with a force to assist Ryazan, but it was too late. After Ryazan was destroyed on 16 December, Batu's army advanced towards Kolomna. Yuri's army, led by his son Vsevolod and the voivode Yeremey Glebovich, was soundly defeated at the Battle of Kolomna. Vsevolod fled to Vladimir, while Glebovich was killed.

After burning Moscow, the Mongols laid siege to Vladimir on 2 or 3 February 1238. Yuri, having received news of the defeat, had left the capital to gather a larger army on the Sit River, leaving his sons Mstislav and Vsevolod in command. The city fell after a brief siege on 7 February. Yuri's wife Agatha, his sons, daughter Theodora, daughters-in-law, and grandchildren, along with Bishop Mitrofan, died when the Dormition Cathedral, where they had sought refuge, was set on fire and collapsed. Some Russian historians, such as Vadim Kargalov and Gelian Prokhorov, have suggested this account may have been altered to conceal the fact that some members of the princely family were taken captive.

Yuri himself was killed on 4 March 1238, in the Battle of the Sit River, when the Mongol commander Burundai surprised and defeated the army of Vladimir-Suzdal. Bishop Kirill of Rostov later found Yuri's decapitated body on the battlefield and brought it to Rostov for burial. His head was later found and reunited with his body. In 1239, his brother and successor, Yaroslav II, solemnly transferred his remains to the Dormition Cathedral in Vladimir.

== Legacy and assessment ==
Chroniclers described Yuri as a pious and valiant ruler, who "was adorned with good morals, strove to fulfill God's commandments... [and] was merciful beyond measure." He founded the Annunciation Monastery in Nizhny Novgorod and oversaw the rebuilding and decoration of cathedrals in Suzdal.

Traditional historiography often portrayed Yuri as being responsible for the catastrophic Mongol conquest due to his failure to unite the Rus' princes. However, this view has been challenged. Historian Vadim Kargalov argued that the tragedy of the era was not the fault of any single prince but a result of the deep-seated political fragmentation of Kievan Rus', which made a unified defence impossible. Other historians note that even a united Rus' might have struggled against the Mongol military machine, which conquered numerous powerful states in the 13th century.

Yuri was canonized by the Russian Orthodox Church in 1645 as a Right-believing Prince. His relics were found to be incorrupt, and he is venerated on 4 February (O.S.) / 17 February (N.S.).

== Family ==
Yuri married Agafia of Chernigov in 1211. She was a daughter of Vsevolod IV of Kiev, Grand Prince of Kiev. They had five children:

- Vsevolod (1212/13–1238), Prince of Novgorod. Married Marina (1215–1238), daughter of Vladimir III Rurikovich of Kiev. He was killed by the Mongols before the siege of Vladimir.
- Mstislav (after 1213–1238). Married Maria (1220–1238). Died during the siege of Vladimir.
- Vladimir (after 1218–1238), Prince of Moscow. Married Christina (1219–1238). Captured during the Mongol siege of Moscow and executed before the walls of Vladimir.
- Dobrava Yurievna (1215–1265). In 1226, she married Vasylko Romanovych, Prince of Volhynia. She was the only one of Yuri's children to survive the Mongol invasion.
- Theodora (1229–1238). Died during the siege of Vladimir.

== See also ==
- Kitezh

Yuri II of Vladimir Yurievichi Born: 1188 Died: 4 March 1238
Regnal titles
Preceded by Vsevolod the Big Nest	Grand Prince of Vladimir-Suzdal; 1212–1216	Succeeded by Konstantin of Rostov
Preceded by Konstantin of Rostov	Grand Prince of Vladimir-Suzdal; 1218–1238	Succeeded by Yaroslav II
