= Battle of Lipitsa =

13th-century battle for Kievan Rus'

Coordinates: 52.6059°N 39.5877°E

- Part of the Vladimir-Suzdal war of succession (1212–1216)
Date	22 April 1216
Location	Suzdalia
Result	Victory for Konstantin Vsevolodovich and Mstislav Mstislavich
Territorial changes	Division of Vsevolod's possessions

Belligerents
Rostov (Konstantin); Novgorod (Mstislav); Supported by: Rostislavichi of Smolensk	Vladimir (Yuri); Zalessky (Yaroslav); Supported by: Olgovichi of Chernigov

Commanders and leaders
Konstantin Vsevolodovich; Mstislav Mstislavich	Yuri Vsevolodovich; Yaroslav Vsevolodovich

The Battle of Lipitsa (Russian: Ли́пицкая би́тва) was the decisive battle in the Vladimir-Suzdal war of succession (1212–1216), the struggle over the grand princely throne of Vladimir following the death of Vsevolod the Big Nest. (Note: "When Vsevold died in 1212 he divided his territories among his sons, the largest portion going to the second oldest, Iuri. Immediately the sons began to war amongst themselves, each striving to achieve a more favorable position and lands which contributed to the decline of the Suzdal-Vladimir principality.") In the battle, fought on 22 April 1216, the forces of Mstislav the Bold and Konstantin Vsevolodovich defeated those of Konstantin's younger brothers Yuri Vsevolodovich and Yaroslav Vsevolodovich. Konstantin took the throne of Vladimir and reigned as grand prince until his death two years later.

== Source material ==
Though the precise causes of the conflict are unknown, the 16th-century Nikon Chronicle claims Vsevolod disinherited his eldest son Konstantin in favor of Yuri, but the older (and more reliable) Laurentian Codex doesn't mention this.A detailed account of the battle first appeared in the older redaction of the Novgorodian First Chronicle, and later in the Novgorodian Fourth Chronicle, the Sofia First Chronicle.

== Background ==
The 1212–16 war of succession fragmented Vsevolod's lands: Inherited by Konstantin of Rostov Inherited by Yaroslav of Zalessky

The war of succession broke out when Vsevolod the Big Nest died (15 April 1212), and his sons – the Vsevolodovichi – fought over the inheritance. Although Yuri had been the son-in-law of the Olgovichi Kievan grand prince Vsevolod Chermnyi, the latter was dethroned by the Rostislavichi of Smolensk and also died in August 1212. This made all Vsevolodovichi izgoi, or excluded from the succession. Thus, they had no legitimacy and motive anymore to interfere in the Kievan succession, and fully concentrated their efforts on fighting each other over supremacy in the north. Apart from the Suzdalian patrimonium, they sought to regain their lost control over the Novgorod Republic, where the Rostislavichi prince Mstislav Mstislavich reigned from 1210 to 1215. Yaroslav briefly occupied Novgorod in 1215, but Mstislav allied himself with Konstantin against Yuri and Yaroslav.

The Novgorodian First Chronicle relates that Mstislav the Bold launched his campaign against his son-in-law, Yaroslav Vsevolodovich on 1 March 1216, leading a Novgorodian army into his own districts around Lake Seliger at the head of the Volga, where they were told "Go out foraging but take no heads." Sviatoslav Vsevolodovich, the fourth son of Vsevolod the Big Nest, invested Rzhevka with 10,000 men, but Mstislav and Vladimir of Pskov broke the siege with, according to the chronicle, a mere 500 men and Sviatoslav fled.

After this encounter, Mstislav joined up with Vladimir of Smolensk and advanced toward Pereiaslavl. At this same time, detachments of Yaroslav Vsevolodovich's troops attacked a small force led by one of Mstislav's lieutenants (Yarun) near Torzhok, between Tver' and Novgorod, but Yaroslav's forces were beaten off. The survivors reported to Yaroslav who then attacked towns along the Volga before turning back to muster forces from Novgorod and then joining Yuri and Sviatoslav at Pereislavl. These forces mustered along the river Kzha or Gza (Russian: Гза).

Mstislav joined Konstantin and "the two Vladimir's" and mustered their forces on the river Lipitsa River and sent a sotnik (a commander of 100) to Yuri saying they had no quarrel with him, but Yuri stood by his brother, Yaroslav. Mstislav also asked that the Novgorodians and men of Novy Torg that were part of Yaroslav's army be released and allowed to return home so that brothers and sons would not fight each other, as much of Mstislav's army was also Novgorodian. Mstislav offered peace as long as Yaroslav would return Mstislav's Novgorodian districts, but Yaroslav would not sue for peace.

== Battle ==
The Novgorodian First Chronicle and other chronicle accounts do not relate the precise order of battle (the account was written by a monk who was not familiar with strategy or tactics). The battle begins with the Novgorodians telling Mstislav that they did not want to fight on horseback but on foot, as their fathers had at an earlier battle. This pleased Mstislav (fighting on horseback may have implied a willingness to flee the battle on horse rather than standing to fight). The Novgorodians then threw off their horse breeches riding boots and ran into battle barefoot. With "the help of Saint Sophia (Holy Wisdom)," the Novgorodians drove off Yaroslav and Yuri, and the number of those killed was said to have been "countless."

== Aftermath ==
Yaroslav fled to Pereiaslavl and cast the Novgorodians in his army into a pit or into prison there, where large numbers of them died. Mstislav entered Pereiaslavl and the town and princely residence caught fire (the chronicle does not say if it was intentionally set alight or not). Yuri parleyed with Mstislav and agreed to withdraw from the city the following day. He withdrew to Radoliv while Mstislav and his Novgorodian army placed Konstantin on the throne in Vladimir after which Mstislav returned to Novgorod with the remnant of the Novgorodian army.

== Location of the battlefield ==
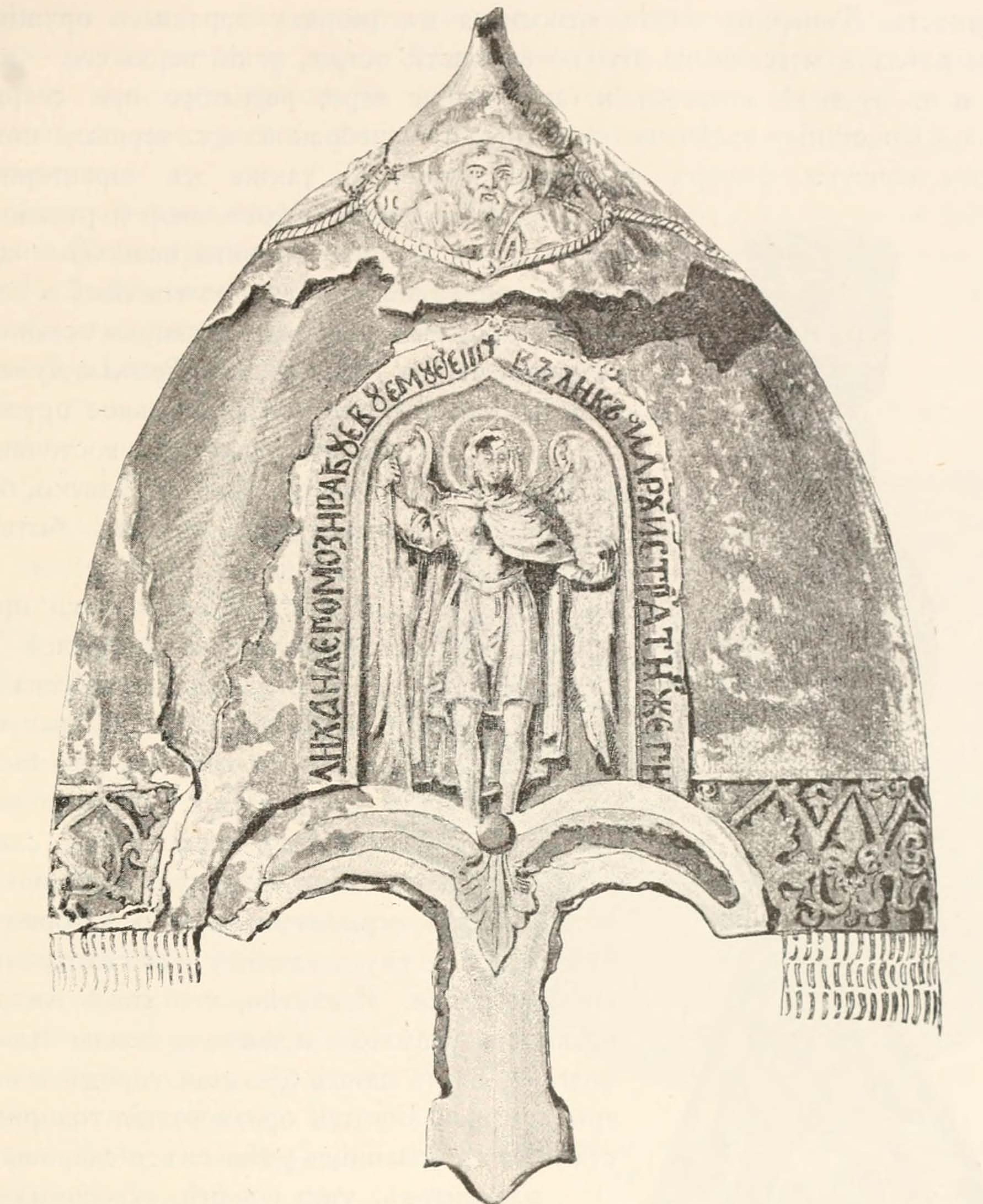
A helmet purportedly lost by Yaroslav II in the aftermath of the Lipitsa Battle and retrieved by a peasant in 1808.

The location of the battlefield was a matter of some contention until 1808, when a peasant woman from Lykovo near Yuriev-Polsky on the river Koloksha (a tributary of the Klyazma) discovered an old gilded helmet with an image of St. Theodore, the patron saint of Yaroslav Vsevolodovich. The helmet has been preserved in the Kremlin Armoury.

As a piece of rare workmanship, the helmet is usually attributed to Yaroslav. Indeed, the chronicler noted that Yaroslav had fled the battlefield without his armour and arrived in Vladimir having nothing on but a shirt. Actor Nikolai Cherkasov, when playing the part of Yaroslav's son Alexander Nevsky in the eponymous film, wore a replica of this helmet.

== See also ==
- Holy Mary mountain

== Bibliography ==
- Alef, Gustave (1956). A history of the Muscovite civil war: the reign of Vasili II (1425–1462) (PhD).
- Martin, Janet (2007). Medieval Russia: 980–1584. Second Edition. E-book. Cambridge: Cambridge University Press. ISBN 978-0-511-36800-4.
- Raffensperger, Christian; Ostrowski, Donald (2023). The Ruling Families of Rus: Clan, Family and Kingdom. London: Reaktion Books. p. 309. ISBN 978-1-78914-745-2. (e-book)
