= Rostislava Mstislavna =

Rostislava Mstislavna (Russian: Ростислава Мстиславна; Christian name: Feodosia; Russian: Феодосия; died 1241/1244) was the grand princess consort of Vladimir from 1214 until her death as the second wife of Yaroslav II.

== Life ==
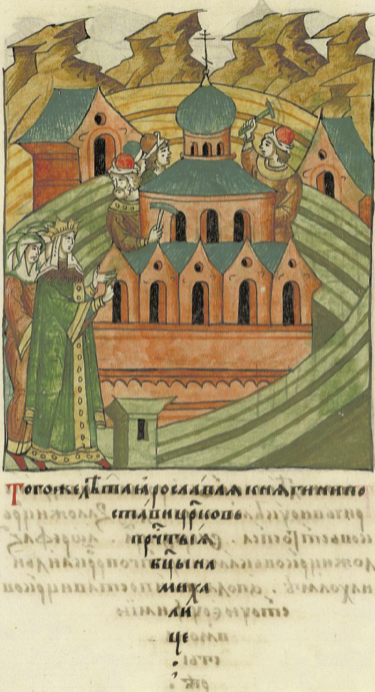
Construction of the church on Mikhalitsa by Rostislava, miniature from the Illustrated Chronicle of Ivan the Terrible (16th century)

Her parents were Mstislav Mstislavich ("the Bold") and a daughter (christened Maria) of the Kipchak khan Kotyan. Information about her is scarce and controversial.

She married Yaroslav II of Vladimir in 1214, and is said to have two daughters as well as seven, eight, or nine sons, including Alexander Nevsky, although some claim that Yaroslav's issue is from his third wife. She died in Novgorod in 1241 or 1244, assuming the monastic name Yevfrosiniya (Euphrosyne).

She is known to have overseen the construction of the first (wooden) building of the Church of the Nativity of the Theotokos on Mikhalitsa in Novgorod.
