= Maria Shvarnovna =

First wife of Vsevolod III Big Nest

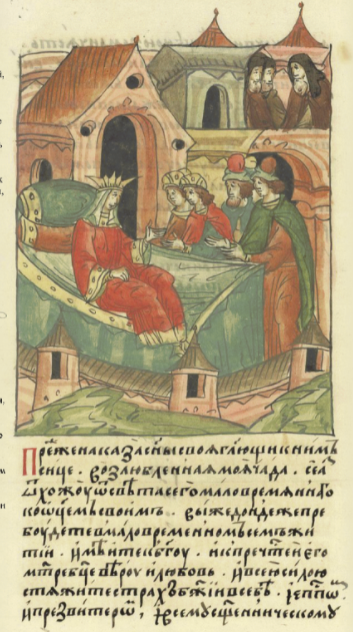
Maria Shvarnovna on her deathbed, miniature from the Illustrated Chronicle of Ivan the Terrible (16th century)

Maria Shvarnovna (Russian: Мария Шварновна; c. 1158 – 19 March/19 May 1205/1206), also known by her monastic name Marfa, was the grand princess consort of Vladimir as the first wife of Vsevolod III ("the Big Nest"). She is venerated as a saint in the Russian Orthodox Church.

She gave birth to at least 12 children, hence Vsevolod's sobriquet. Four of her sons, Konstantin, George, Yaroslav and Sviatoslav, succeeded their father as grand princes of Vladimir, and Yaroslav went on to become grand prince of Kiev around the time of the Mongol conquest. As Yaroslav's mother, she is thus the paternal grandmother of Alexander Nevsky, whose son, Daniel of Moscow, founded the Muscovite branch of the Rurik dynasty.

== Life ==
Maria's origins have long been disputed. The Uspensky Sbornik, a 13th-century text now housed in the Russian State Museum in Moscow, say she was Moravian. M. V. Shchepkina posited the idea that the Sbornik was compiled for Maria in 1199–1206, and thus the claims that she was Moravian might be more believable than the other claims. A number of researchers, relying on the Nikon Chronicle, have recently put forward a third hypothesis that her father was the voivode Shvarn, possibly of Czech origin, who had the patronymic Zhiroslavich.

In 1172–1174, she married Vsevolod Yuryevich. She lived in Pereslavl-Zalessky with her husband from 1175 until 1176, when Vsevolod became grand prince of Vladimir on the death of Mikhail, after which she moved to Vladimir. During the first few years of her marriage, she only gave birth to daughters; the first son, Konstantin, was born in 1185. In 1186, their eldest daughter, Vseslava, married Rostislav Yaroslavich of Snovsk, nephew of Sviatoslav III of Kiev. In 1188, their eight-year-old daughter Verkhuslava was sent to Chernigov and later married Rostislav II of Kiev upon reaching adulthood. The same year, their son Boris died as a result of plague.

On 14 August 1189, she took part in the consecration of the Dormition Cathedral in Vladimir. She may have taken part in the renovation of the cathedral in 1194. In 1198, she gave birth to her eighth son, Ivan, but she became seriously ill. In 1198–1200, she bought a plot of land and the Princess's Convent was founded. It later became the burial site of representatives of the ruling dynasty. In 1203, the youngest daughter, Yelena, was buried there. Three weeks before Maria died, she died to become a nun and took the name Marfa.

The date of her death is also uncertain, as 19 March 1205 is also given in some accounts. The Novgorod First Chronicle mentions her death under the year 1205, but does not give an exact day. As it is mentioned after her son Konstantin's arrival in Novgorod on March 20, it would seem she died after that, perhaps in May.

== Veneration ==
Maria is venerated as a saint by the Russian Orthodox Church and is credited with founding several convents, most notably the Convent of the Assumption, known as the Princess's Convent in Vladimir-on-the-Klyazma.

The descendants of Yaroslav Vsevolodovich had close ties with the convent and often named their daughters Maria. Eudoxia of Moscow in particular held a strong connection with the convent. The elder sister of the grand princesses of Moscow was named Maria as was one of the daughters of Dmitry Donskoy and later Vasily I.

The convent fell into disrepair in the mid-15th century, which later affected the veneration of Maria. It was restored in the early 16th century, which led to a renewal in the interest of Maria as a member of the ruling dynasty and the founder of the convent, particular under Metropolitan Macarius of Moscow. The Book of Royal Degrees gives details about her death: "And in the side-chapel of the Annunciation, on the right side from the north, [are the burials of] the great princess, nun Marfa Shvarnovna, and the grand princess Anna; and on the left side — the martyr Abraham (Avraamy)...". (Note: «а в приделе Благовещения от севера на правои стране - великая княгини инока Марфа Щьварновна да великая княгини Анна, а на левои стране - мученик Авраамии...»)

== Issue ==
Maria and Vsevolod the Big Nest had at least eight sons and four daughters in total:

- Sbislava Vsevolodovna (born 26 October 1178);
- Vseslava Vsevolodovna (died c. 1206), married Rostislav Yaroslavich, prince of Snov and son of Yaroslav II Vsevolodovich, prince of Chernigov, whose paternal grandfather was Vsevolod II of Kiev;
- Verkhuslava Vsevolodovna, married Rostislav II of Kiev (born 1181);
- Konstantin Vsevolodovich, prince of Rostov (18 May 1186 – 2 February 1218);
- Boris Vsevolodovich. (died 1188);
- Gleb Vsevolodovich (died 29 September 1189);
- Yury Vsevolodovich, grand prince of Vladimir (1189 – 4 March 1238);
- Yaroslav Vsevolodovich, grand prince of Vladimir (8 February 1191 – 30 September 1246);
- Yelena Vsevolodovna (died after 1206);
- Vladimir Vsevolodovich, prince of Yuryev-Polsky (25 October 1194 – 6 January 1229);
- Svyatoslav Vsevolodovich, grand prince of Vladimir (27 March 1196 – 3 February 1252);
- Ivan Vsevolodovich, prince of Starodub (28 November 1197 – after 1247);

== Sources ==
- Kuzmin, A. V. (2016). "Мария Шварновна". Православная энциклопедия. Т. XLIII: Максим — Маркелл I. Moscow: Православная энциклопедия. pp. 603–607. ISBN 978-5-89572-049-3.
