= Yaroslav II of Vladimir =

Grand Prince of Vladimir (r. 1238–1246)

Yaroslav II
- grand Prince of Vladimir
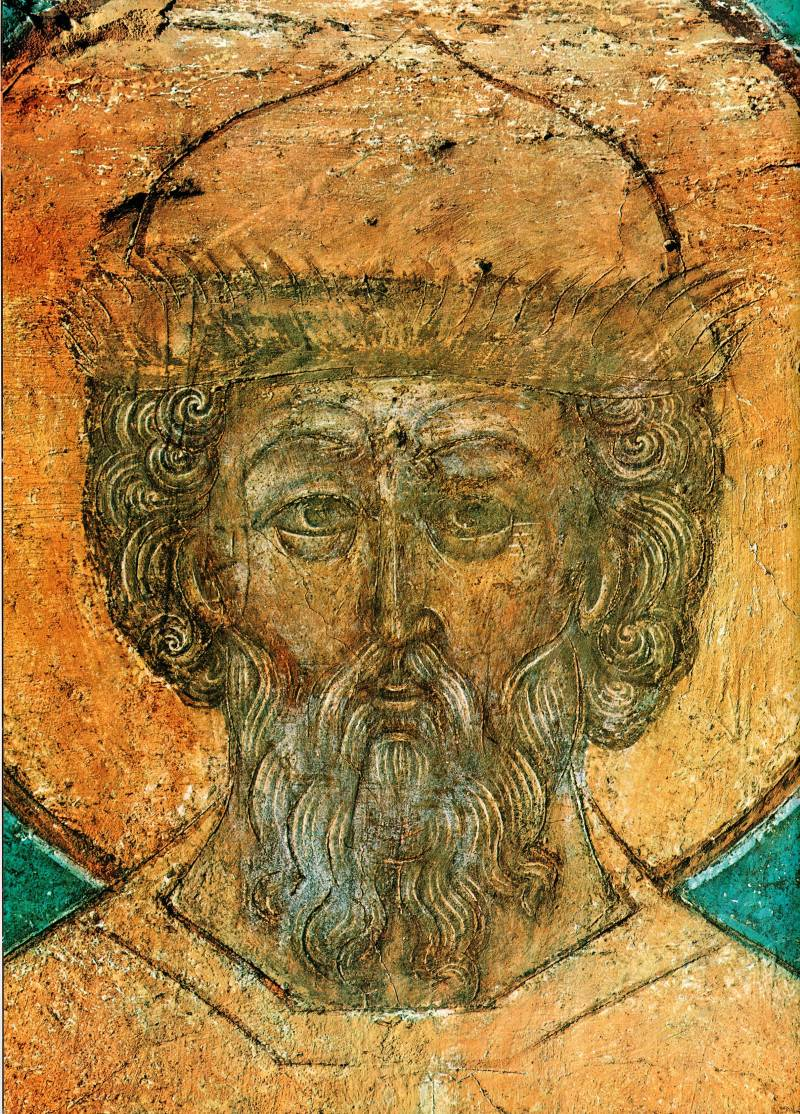
- Portrait from the Cathedral of the Archangel (17th century)
- Born: 8 February 1191
- Died: 30 September 1246 (aged 55); Karakorum, Mongol Empire
- Spouse: a daughter of Yuri Konchakovich; Rostislava Mstislavna; Fedosia Igorevna of Ryazan
- Issue more...: Alexander Nevsky; Andrei II of Vladimir; Mikhail Khorobrit; Yaroslav of Tver; Vasily of Kostroma
- House: Rurikids (main dynasty name); Yurievichi (sub-name)
- Father: Vsevolod the Big Nest
- Mother: Maria Shvarnovna
- Religion: Eastern Orthodox Christianity

Yaroslav II Vsevolodovich (Russian: Яросла́в II Все́володович; Christian name: Theodore (Феодо́р); 8 February 1191 – 30 September 1246), also transliterated as Iaroslav, was Grand Prince of Vladimir from 1238 to 1246. He collaborated with Batu Khan following the Mongol invasion. According to Giovanni da Pian del Carpine, he was poisoned by Töregene Khatun.

== Prince of Pereyaslav ==
Yaroslav was the fourth son of Vsevolod the Big Nest and Maria Shvarnovna.

In 1200, he was sent by his father to rule the town of Pereiaslav near the Kypchak steppes. Six years later, he was summoned by boyars of Halych to rule their city but could not effectively claim the throne. Thereupon he was sent to take Ryazan, but the stubborn opposition of the inhabitants led to the city being burnt. In 1209, Vsevolod sent Yaroslav to oppose Mstislav the Bold in Novgorod. After several battles, the two princes made peace, whereby Yaroslav married Mstislav's daughter.

Upon his deathbed, Vsevolod the Big Nest bequeathed to him Pereslavl-Zalessky. In the conflict between his elder brothers Konstantin and Yuri, Yaroslav supported the latter. In 1215, he accepted the offer of the Novgorodians to become their prince but, desiring revenge for their former treachery, captured Torzhok and blocked its supplies of grain to Novgorod. Several months later, he was defeated by his father-in-law on the Lipitsa River and had to retreat to Pereslavl; a helmet that he lost during the battle would be retrieved by archaeologists in 1808.

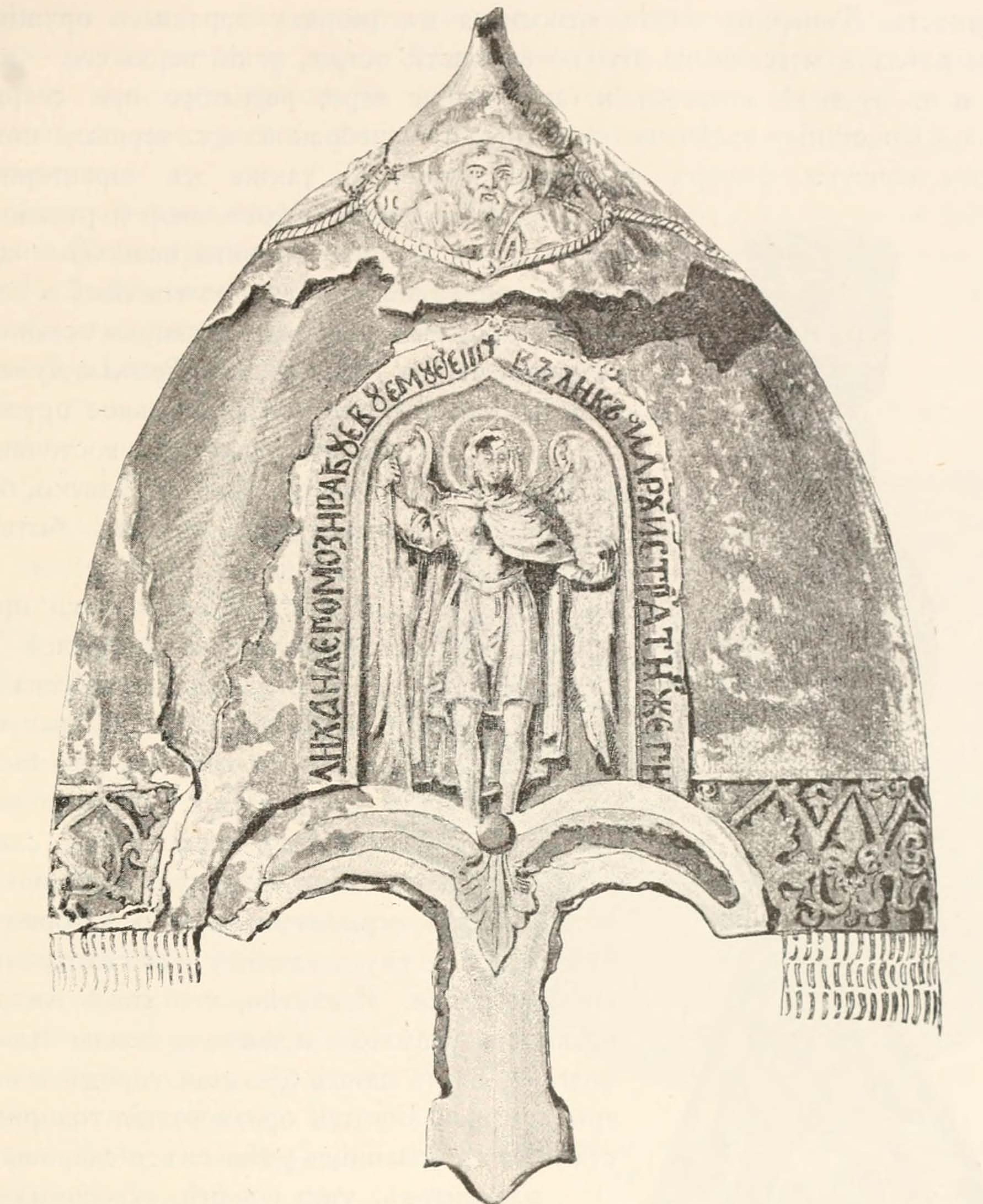
A helmet lost by Yaroslav in the aftermath of the Lipitsa Battle and retrieved by a peasant in 1808.

== Prince of Novgorod and Kiev ==
His next ambition was to subjugate Pskov, but the Novgorodians refused to make war against its neighbour. Yaroslav departed in anger and seized the Novgorodian enclave of Volokolamsk. In 1234, he returned to Novgorod and several years later defeated its chief enemies—the Lithuanians and the Teutonic Knights. In 1236, he followed Daniel of Galicia's advice and moved from Novgorod to Kiev, leaving his son Alexander as his representative in the north.

== Grand Prince of Vladimir ==
In 1238, when the Mongols first invaded Kievan Rus' and his elder brother Yuri was killed in battle, Yaroslav left Kiev for Vladimir, where he was crowned grand prince. Yaroslav attempted to restore the cities of Vladimir-Suzdal after the Mongol ravages and fires. In 1243, he was summoned by Batu Khan to his capital Sarai. After a lengthy conference, he returned to Vladimir with honours. Two years later, he was again summoned to the east, this time by Güyük Khan in Karakorum.

According to Giovanni da Pian del Carpine, Yaroslav ate at the tent of Töregene Khatun and immediately became ill. Within a week, he died. Carpine claims that everyone believed he had been poisoned by Töregene to enable the conquest of his lands. However, this accusation has been disputed by later historians.

== Family ==
Yaroslav married his first wife c. 1205. She was a daughter of Yuri Konchakovich, Khan of the Cumans. Her people belonged to the Kipchaks, a confederation of pastoralists and warriors of Turkic origin.

In 1214, Yaroslav married his second wife Rostislava Mstislavna. She was a daughter of Mstislav the Bold and another Cuman princess. Her maternal grandfather was Kotian Khan. They were divorced in 1216.

In 1218, Yaroslav married his third wife Fedosia Igorevna of Ryazan. She was a daughter of Igor Glebovich and Agrafena of Kiev. Her father was the second son of Gleb Rostislavich, Prince of Ryazan (d. 1178) and Euphrosyne of Pereyaslavl. Her mother was a daughter of Rostislav I of Kiev. They had at least twelve children:

- Fyodor Yaroslavich (Winter, 1219 – 5 June 1233). Betrothed to Euphrosyne Mikhailovna of Chernigov. She was a daughter of Michael of Chernigov and Maria Romanovna of Galicia and Volynia. Fyodor died the day before his marriage date.
- Alexander Nevsky (30 May 1220 – 14 November 1263).
- Andrei II of Vladimir (c. 1222–1264).
- Mikhail Khorobrit, Prince of Moscow. Took control of Vladimir and proclaimed himself its Prince in 1248. Killed while facing a Lithuanian invasion.
- Daniil Yaroslavich (d. 1256).
- Yaroslav of Tver (d. 9 September 1271).
- Konstantin Yaroslavich, Prince of Galich and Dmitrov.
- Maria Yaroslavna (born 1240).
- Vasily of Kostroma (1241–1276).
- Afanasy Yaroslavich.
- Eudoxia Yaroslavna.
- Iuliana Yaroslavna.

Yurievichi connection of Moscow, Novgorod-Suzdal, and Tver

Yaroslav II of Vladimir; G. P. of Vladimir (1238–1246); Grandson of Yurievichi progenitor Yuri Dolgorukiy
Alexander Nevsky; Prince of Novgorod (~1246~1259); G. P. of Vladimir (1252–1263)	Andrey II of Vladimir; Prince of Suzdal (1256–1264); G. P. of Vladimir (1249–1252)	Yaroslav of Tver; Prince of Tver (1247–1271); G. P. of Vladimir (1263–1271)
Daniel of Moscow; Prince of Moscow (1283–1303); Daniilovichi progenitor	Konstantin of Suzdal; Prince of Nizhny; Novgorod-Suzdal (1341–1355)	Mikhail of Tver; Prince of Tver (1285–1318); G. P. of Vladimir (1304–1318)

== Bibliography ==
- Martin, Janet (2007). Medieval Russia: 980–1584. Second Edition. E-book. Cambridge: Cambridge University Press. ISBN 978-0-511-36800-4.

Yaroslav II of Vladimir Yurievichi Born: 8 February 1191 Died: 30 September 1246
Regnal titles
Preceded by Yuri II	Grand Prince of Vladimir; 1238–1246	Succeeded by Sviatoslav III
Preceded by Vladimir IV	Grand Prince of Kiev; 1236–1238	Succeeded by Michael II
Preceded by Michael II	Grand Prince of Kiev; 1243-1246	Succeeded by Alexander Nevsky
