= Vsevolod the Big Nest =

12th-century prince of Kievan Rus'

Vsevolod III Yuryevich
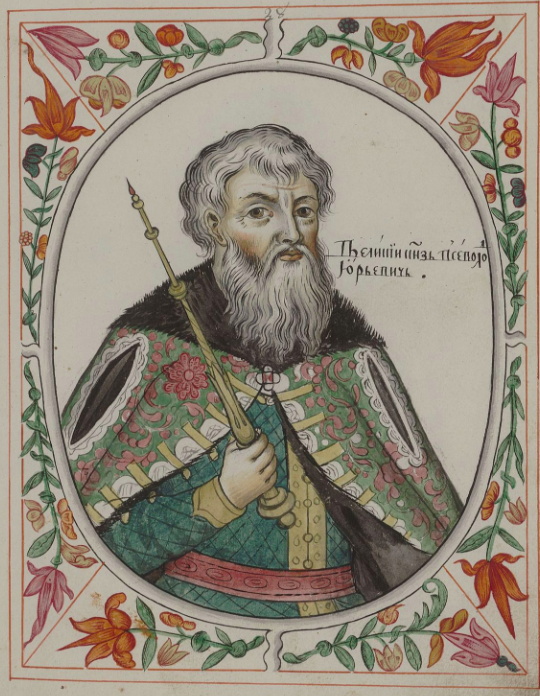
- Portrait in the Tsarsky titulyarnik (1673)
- Born: 19 October 1154; Dmitrov, Vladimir-Suzdal
- Died: 15 April 1212 (aged 57); Vladimir, Vladimir-Suzdal
- Spouse: Maria Shvarnovna; Liubov Vasilkovna of Polotsk
- Issue more...: Konstantin of Rostov; Yuri II of Vladimir; Yaroslav II of Vladimir; Sviatoslav III of Vladimir
- House: Rurikids (main dynasty name); Yurievichi (sub-name)
- Father: Yuri Dolgoruky
- Mother: Helene
- Religion: Eastern Orthodox

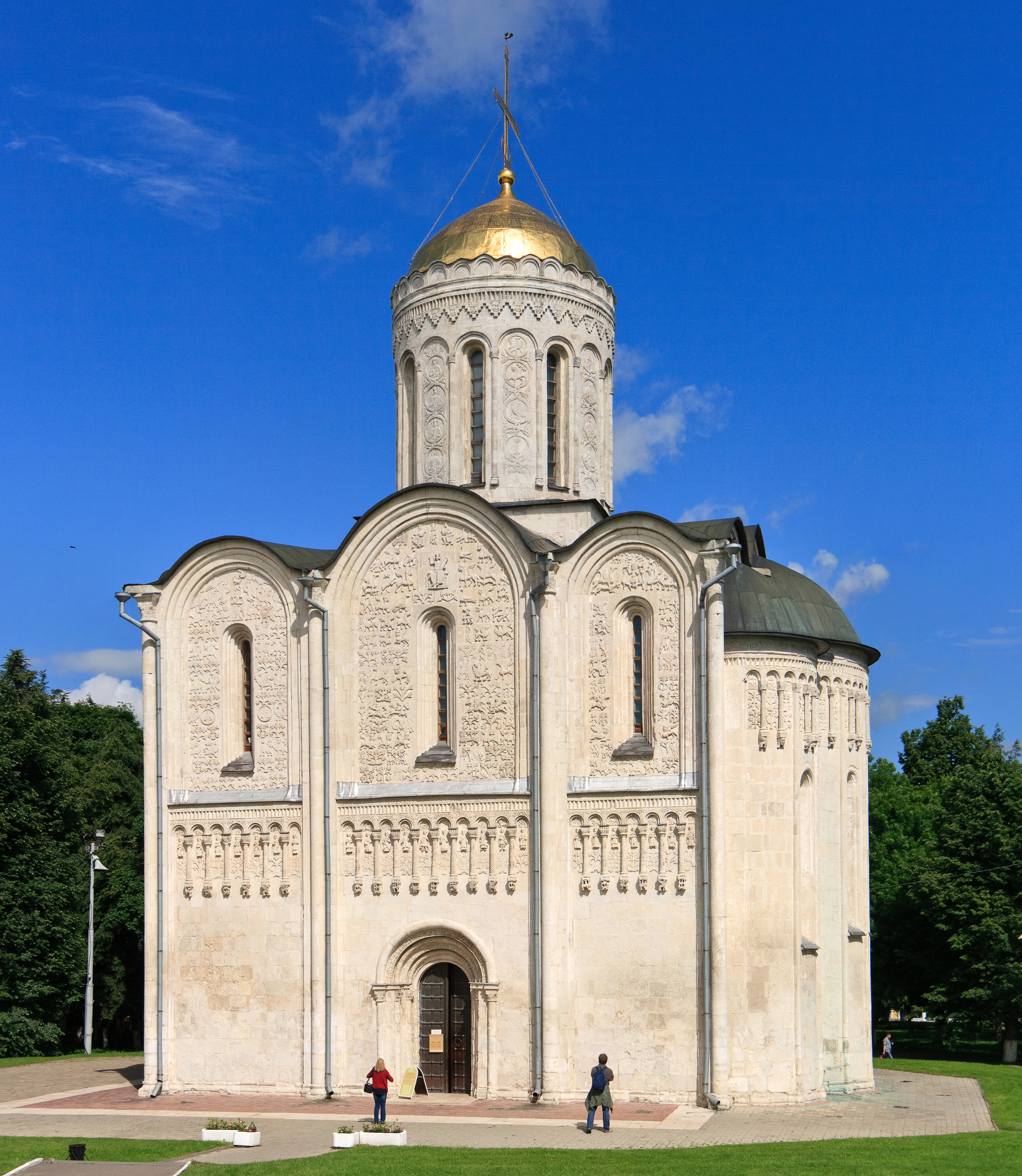
Vsevolod's Christian name was Dmitry and so he dedicated his palace church to Saint Demetrius, his patron saint.

Vsevolod III Yuryevich the Big Nest (Russian: Все́волод III Ю́рьевич Большо́е Гнездо́, romanized: Vsévolod III Yúr'yevich Bol'shóye Gnezdó; 1154–1212) was Grand Prince of Vladimir from 1176 to 1212. His long reign is customarily credited for the city's ancient glory.

== Family ==
Vsevolod was the tenth or eleventh son of Yuri Dolgoruky (c. 1099 – 1157), who founded the town Dmitrov to commemorate the site of Vsevolod's birth. Nikolai Karamzin (1766–1826) began the speculation that Vsevolod's mother Helene was a Greek princess, because after her husband's death she took Vsevolod with her to Constantinople, but other scholars such as Alexander Kazhdan have since regarded this as speculative.

Vsevolod spent his youth at the chivalric court of the Komnenoi. On his return from the Byzantine Empire to Rus' in 1170, Vsevolod supposedly visited Tbilisi, as a local chronicle reports that that year the Georgian king entertained his nephew from Constantinople and married him to his relative, an Ossetian princess.

== Reign ==
In 1173 two Smolensk princes captured Kiev (Kyiv), captured Vsevolod and briefly installed him on the throne. Ransomed a year later, Vsevolod took his brother Mikhalko's side in his struggle against the powerful boyars of Rostov and Suzdal. Upon Mikhalko's death in 1176, Vsevolod succeeded him in Vladimir. He promptly subjugated the boyars and systematically raided the Volga states, notably Volga Bulgaria. He installed puppet rulers on the throne of Novgorod and married his daughters to princes of Chernigov and Kiev.

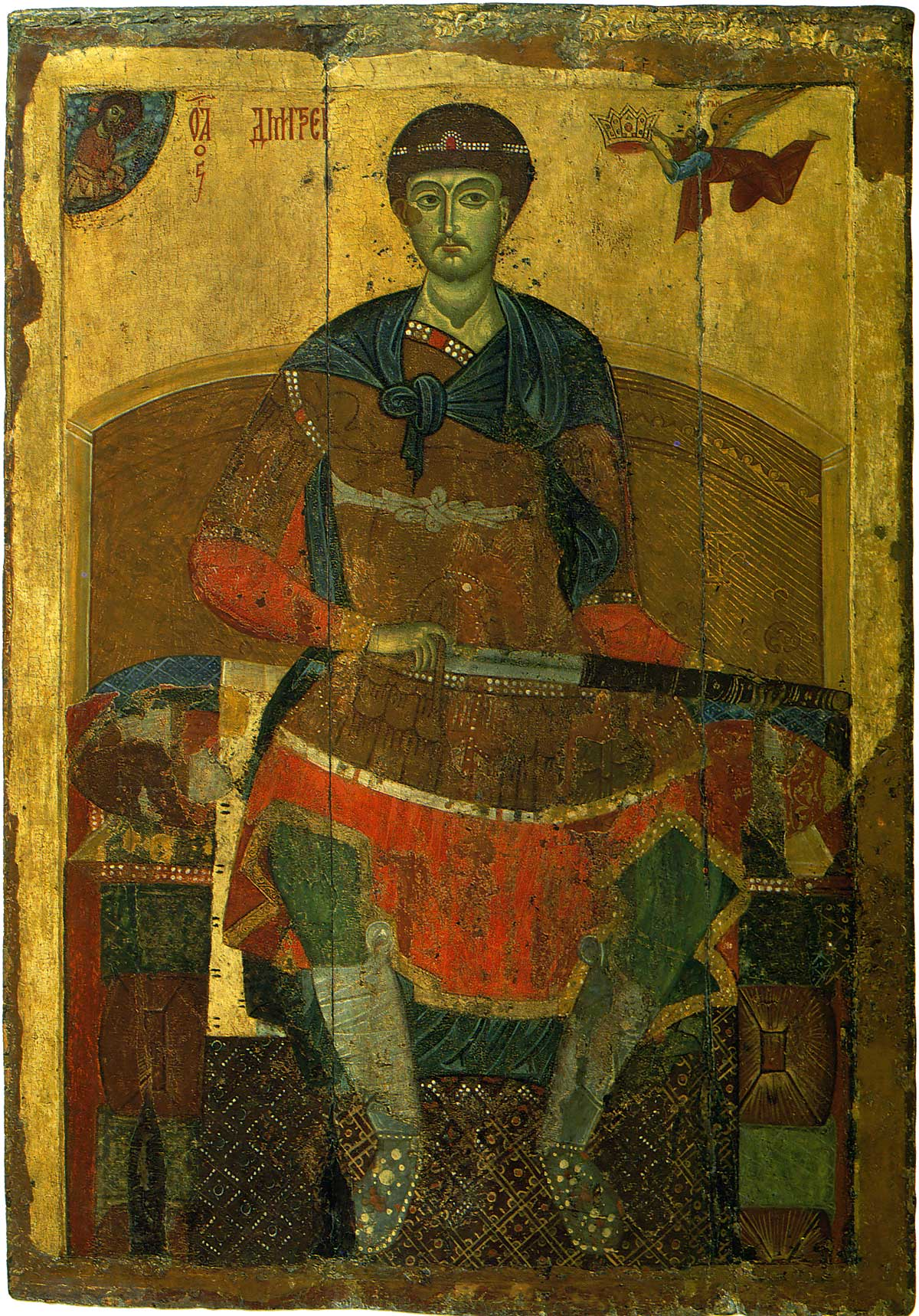
Vsevolod's icon shows his patron saint, St Demetrius, drawing a sword from a scabbard

Vsevolod showed little mercy to those who disobeyed his commands. In 1180 and 1187 he punished the princes of Ryazan by ousting them from their lands. In 1207 he burned to the ground both Ryazan and Belgorod. His military fame spread quickly. The Tale of Igor's Campaign, thought to be written during Vsevolod's reign, addresses him thus: "Great prince Vsevolod! Don't you think of flying here from afar to safeguard the paternal golden throne of Kiev? For you can with your oars scatter in drops the Volga, and with your helmets scoop dry the Don."

But Kievan matters concerned Vsevolod little in the latter part of his reign. He concentrated on building up his own capital, Vladimir. His Ossetian wife, Maria Shvarnovna, who devoted herself to works of piety and founded several convents, was glorified by the Russian church as a saint. By her Vsevolod had no fewer than fourteen children, and earned the sobriquet 'Big Nest'.

== Death and succession ==
Before his death, grand prince Vsevolod divided his territories between his sons, with the second-oldest Yuri receiving the largest share. Four of them, Konstantin, George, Yaroslav and Sviatoslav, succeeded him as Grand Dukes of Vladimir. Vsevolod died on 12 April 1212 and was buried at the Assumption Cathedral in Vladimir.

Immediately after Vsevolod's death, the Vladimir-Suzdal war of succession (1212–1216) broke out between his sons, who each sought a greater share of his lands for themselves.

== Marriage and children ==
Vsevolod first married Maria Shvarnovna, whose origins are disputed. She has been variously identified as Ossetian, Alan and Moravian. They had at least fourteen children:

- Sbyslava (Pelagia) Vsevolodovna (born 26 October 1178).
- Vseslava Vsevolodovna. Married Rostislav Yaroslavich, Prince of Snovsk. He was a son of Yaroslav II Vsevolodovich, Prince of Chernigov. His paternal grandfather was Vsevolod II of Kiev.
- Verchoslava Vsevolodovna. Married Rostislav II of Kiev.
- Konstantin of Rostov (18 May 1186 – 2 February 1218).
- Boris Vsevolodovich. (c. 1187–1238).
- Gleb Vsevolodovich (d. 29 September 1189).
- Yuri II of Vladimir (1189 – 4 March 1238).
- Yaroslav II of Vladimir (8 February 1191 – 30 September 1246).
- Helena Vsevolodovna (d. 1204).
- Vladimir Vsevolodovich, Prince of Yuryev-Polsky (25 October 1192 – 6 January 1227).
- Sviatoslav III of Vladimir (27 March 1196 – 3 February 1252).
- Ioann Vsevolodovich, Prince of Starodub (28 November 1197 – after 1247).
- Anna Vsevolodovna. Married Vladimir, Prince of Belgorod (d. 1239).

After Maria died in 1205 or 1206, Vsevolod married Liubov Vasilkovna in 1209. She was a daughter of Vasilko Bryacheslavich, Prince of Vitebsk. They had no known children.

Vsevolod the Big Nest Yurievichi Born: 1154 Died: 1212
Regnal titles
Preceded by Mikhalko Yuriyevich	Grand Prince of Vladimir-Suzdal; 1176–1212	Succeeded by Yuri II
Preceded by Roman I	Grand Prince of Kiev; 1173	Succeeded by Rurik
