= Sviatoslav III of Vladimir =

Grand Prince of Vladimir (1196–1252)

Sviatoslav III Vsevolodovich of Vladimir (Russian: Святослав III Всеволодович) (27 March 1196 – 3 February 1252) was the Prince of Novgorod (1200–1205, 1207–1210) and Grand Prince of Vladimir-Suzdal (1246–1248).

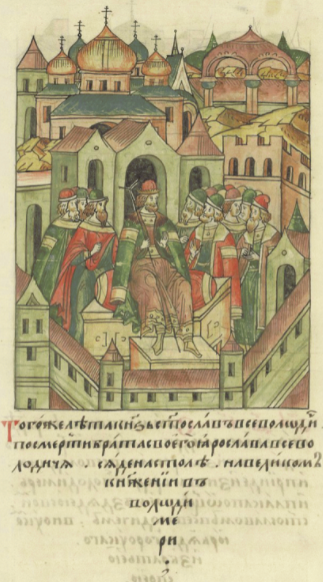
Svyatoslav III on the throne,miniature from the Illustrated Chronicle of Ivan the Terrible (16th century)

Sviatoslav III Vsevolodovich was the sixth son of Vsevolod the Big Nest and Maria Shvarnovna. Before his death, grand prince Vsevolod divided his territories between his sons; as soon as he died, the Vladimir-Suzdal war of succession (1212–1216) broke out between them. During the partition of his father's lands, he received the town of Yuriev-Polsky. It was he who commissioned the town's principal landmark, the Cathedral of St. George, constructed in 1230–34. In 1220 Sviatoslav sacked Aşlı in Volga Bulgaria.

Sviatoslav III's reign in Vladimir was short and uneventful. In 1248, his nephew Mikhail Khorobrit of Moscow, in defiance of the centuries-old succession system, seized the city of Vladimir and ousted Sviatoslav back to Yuriev-Polsky. Two years later, Sviatoslav and his son visited the Golden Horde, pleading with the Khan to reinstate him on the grand princely throne. He died on 3 February 1252 and was buried in Yuriev-Polsky.

Sviatoslav III of Vladimir Yurievichi Born: 27 March 1196 Died: 3 February 1252
Regnal titles
Preceded by Yaroslav II	Grand Prince of Vladimir; 1246–1248	Succeeded by Mikhail Khorobrit
