= Vladimir-Suzdal =

Russian principality (1125–1389)

Grand Principality of Vladimir Великое княжество Владимирское
- 1125–1389
- Seal of Alexander Nevsky

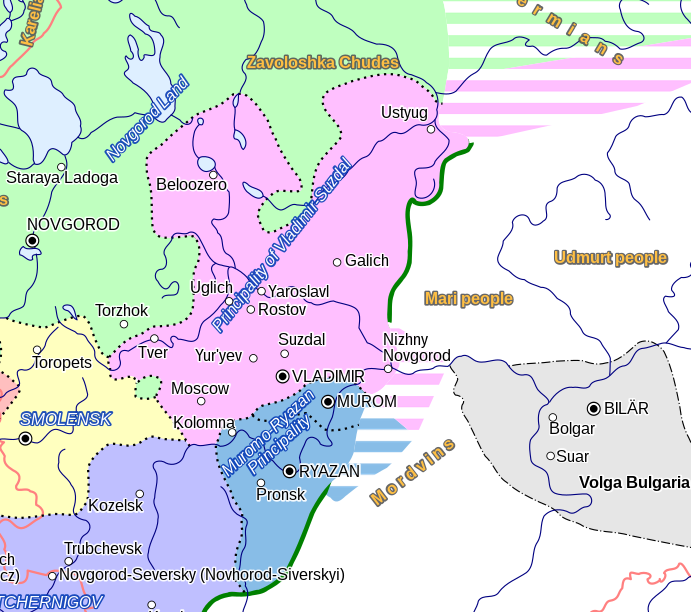
- Vladimir-Suzdal in 1237
- Capital: Suzdal (1125–1157); Vladimir (1157–1389)
- Common languages: Russian; Church Slavonic^{1}
- Religion: Russian Orthodoxy
- Government: Feudal monarchy
- Grand Prince
  - 1125–1157 (first): Yuri Dolgoruky
  - 1363–1389 (last): Dmitry Donskoy
- Historical era: High Middle Ages
  - Established: 1125
  - Disestablished: 1389
| Preceded by | Succeeded by |
| Kievan Rus' | Grand Principality of Moscow |
- Today part of: Russia
- 1: Liturgical and literary language

The Grand Principality of Vladimir, (Note: Russian: Великое княжество Владимирское, romanized: Velikoye knyazhestvo Vladimirskoye.) before 1157 the Principality of Suzdal, (Note: Russian: Суздальское княжество, romanized: Suzdalskoye knyazhestvo.) commonly known as Vladimir-Suzdal, (Note: Russian: Владимиро-Суздальское княжество, romanized: Vladimiro-Suzdalskoye knyazhestvo.) or simply Suzdalia, was a Russian principality. Its capital was the city of Vladimir. In Russian historiography, its original territory is commonly denoted as northeast Russia or northeast Rus'. (Note: Russian: Северо-Восточная Русь, romanized: Severo-Vostochnaya Rus.)

It was originally established during the disintegration of Kievan Rus'. Prince Yury Dolgoruky (r. 1125–1157) moved his capital from Rostov to Suzdal in 1125, following the death of his father, Vladimir Monomakh. He ruled a principality that had become virtually independent. His son Andrey (r. 1157–1175) moved the capital to Vladimir and had Kiev sacked in 1169, leading to political power shifting to the north-east. Andrey's younger brother Vsevolod III (r. 1176–1212) secured control of the throne, and following his death, a dynastic conflict ensued. Yury II (r. 1212–1216, 1218–1238) was killed during the Mongol invasions of 1237–1238. His younger brother Yaroslav II (r. 1238–1246) and the other princes submitted to Mongol rule.

From the mid-13th century, the grand prince of Vladimir was the leading prince; the Novgorod Republic in the north recognized his suzerainty. Alexander Nevsky (r. 1252–1263) was the last prince to reign directly in Vladimir. By the end of the 13th century, the grand principality had fragmented into over a dozen appanages. Moscow and Tver emerged as the two dominant principalities, leading to a struggle between them for possession of the grand princely throne. From 1331, the prince of Moscow was also the grand prince of Vladimir, except for one brief interruption from 1360 to 1363, when the throne was held by Nizhny Novgorod during the minority of Dmitry Donskoy. The grand principality was recognized as a family possession of the prince of Moscow, and by 1389, the two thrones were permanently united. The original territory of the grand principality would later serve as the core of the centralized Russian state.

== History ==
=== Origins ===
The first known prince of Rostov mentioned in the Primary Chronicle under the year 988 was Yaroslav Vladimirovich, appointed by his father Vladimir I of Kiev. In 1024, there was reportedly a famine in the area, and a revolt stoked up by pagan sorcerers was suppressed by Yaroslav personally. Upon his death in 1054, Vsevolod Yaroslavich received the lands of Rostov and Suzdal. Little is known about the region until the 1090s, except that the town of Yaroslavl had been founded upon the upper Volga by 1071, and that Vladimir Monomakh ordered a church to be built in Rostov. Bishops are recorded in the 1080s and 1090s, but the seat appears to have remained vacant for the next half-century. The 1097 Council of Liubech confirmed Vladimir Monomakh's possession of Rostov and Suzdal. By the early 12th century, the towns of Rostov, Suzdal and Murom remained junior postings. The future capital Vladimir is mentioned as having been founded by Vladimir Monomakh in 1108.

=== Rostov-Suzdal ===
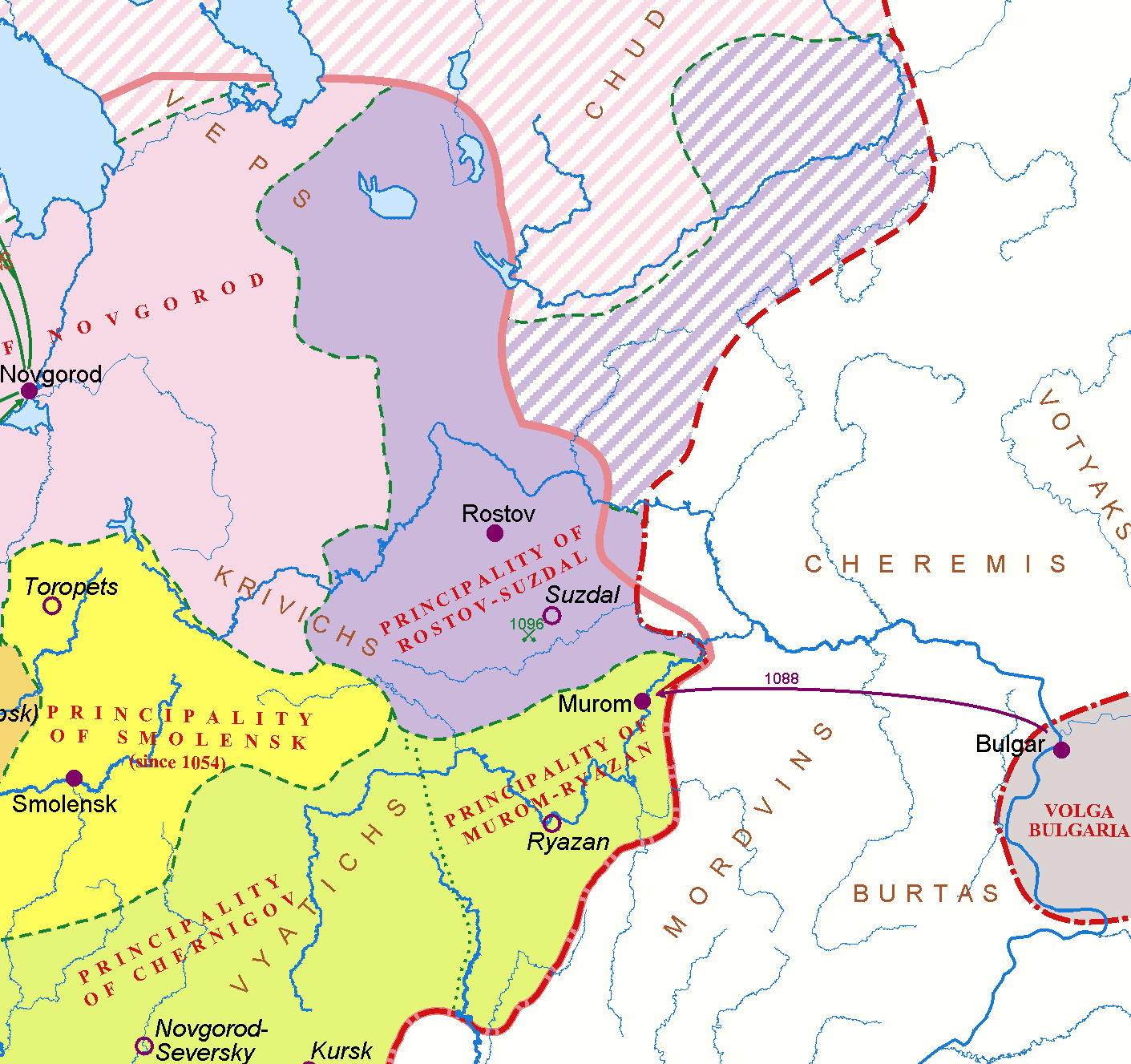
Rostov-Suzdal in c. 1100

Yuri Dolgorukiy, a younger son of Vladimir Monomakh, was assigned Rostov at an early age. Following the death of his father in 1125, Yuri moved the capital from Rostov to Suzdal. The principality was virtually independent at this point. He promoted the founding of new cities, including the future capital Moscow, which was first mentioned in 1147, as well as Ksnyatin, Yuryev-Polsky, Pereyaslavl-Zalessky, and Dmitrov. In addition, Yuri strengthened the principality and defended it against the Volga Bulgars.

He also wrestled for control of the Kievan throne, hence his sobriquet (meaning 'the long arm'). Yuri briefly seized Kiev in 1149 and 1154, and was successful again in 1155, where he stayed until he was poisoned in 1157.

=== Vladimir-Suzdal ===
The 1212–16 war of succession fragmented Vsevolod's lands: Inherited by Konstantin of Rostov Inherited by Yaroslav of Suzdal

Yuri's son, Andrey (r. 1157–1176), succeeded him and moved the capital to Vladimir at the start of his reign; according to some sources, at that point, he assumed the title of grand prince, though other sources state that it was his younger brother, Vsevolod (r. 1176–1212), who was the first prince to officially adopt the title. Nevertheless, Andrey greatly strengthened the principality by expanding its fortifications and constructing new buildings using white stone, characteristic of the developing Vladimir-Suzdal school of architecture. About 10 kilometres (6.2 mi) from the capital, at the mouth of the Nerl, he founded Bogolyubovo and built his new princely residence. He also extended the eastern frontier to defend against the Volga Bulgars, founding the easternmost outpost of Gorokhovets, which would be used as a launchpad for his campaign against the Volga Bulgars in 1164.

Andrey considered the center of his principality to be Vladimir, not Kiev, and when the former was sacked in 1169 during a military campaign, he installed his brother Gleb as prince while continuing to rule from Vladimir. At the same time, he sought to concentrate power into his own hands and become "autocrat (samoderzhets) of all the land of Suzdal". As a result, in 1161, he chased out four of his brothers, two of his nephews, and the "senior boyars of his father". He also sought ecclesiastical independence from Kiev and proposed to create a separate metropolitanate in the north, but this attempt was unsuccessful. The clergyman of Vladimir established local saints and proclaimed that their "autocrat" enjoyed the "protection of heaven". In addition, the cult of the Virgin of Vladimir icon was established and the relics of Leontius of Rostov were discovered. This led to literary activity being elevated and the writing of chronicles reflecting new religious and political ideas.

Gleb's death in 1171 led to yet another succession crisis. Andrey's military campaign in 1173 failed. In addition, the local boyar aristocracy was dissatisfied with Andrey and he fell victim to a conspiracy in 1174, apparently with the participation of Gleb of Ryazan. Andrey's murder led to a popular rebellion, which lasted five days. The boyar aristocracy, with the support of Gleb, intended to confirm on the throne those princes who were suitable to them; however, Andrey's brothers Mikhail of Vladimir (d. 1176) and Vsevolod (r. 1176–1212) won the support of the townspeople and prevailed in the conflict. The boyars were battered and the forces of Ryazan were defeated in a military campaign in 1177, with subsequent resistance being quelled in 1180, 1187, and 1202. By the end of the century, Vsevolod's authority was firmly established. As a result, when he sent his son Konstantin to reign in Novgorod, Vsevolod declared that he had "seniority... in all the Russian land".

Vsevolod's long reign was marked by a significant increase in territory. He extended the border westward and founded Zubtsov. In the east, he continued to strengthen defences against the Volga Bulgars and founded Kostroma, Nerekhta, and Sol Velikaya. He also made incursions into Novgorodian territory in the north and founded Ustyug in 1178. Vsevolod reached an agreement with Novgorod, in which Torzhok and Volok Lamsky would be under their joint control. Vsevolod was also initially successful in subordinating Novgorod to Vladimir, but following an uprising in 1207, Novgorod was removed from Vladimir's sphere of influence. In addition, his son Yaroslav was forced to exit the competition for the throne of Kiev.

The year before his death, Vsevolod drew up a settlement for his two eldest sons: Konstantin was to be given Vladimir, while Yury was to be given Rostov. Konstantin, who already ruled in Rostov, intended to attach Vladimir to Rostov as a family possession and refused to change course. In response, Vsevolod assembled a congress in Vladimir with "all his boyars from his towns and districts, Bishop Ioann [of Rostov and Vladimir], the abbots, priests, merchants, service-men (dvoryane) and all the people" present. There, he bestowed Vladimir upon Yury, while his third-eldest son, Yaroslav, was given Pereyaslavl. Following Vsevolod's death in 1212, a fratricidal war broke out. Yury and Yaroslav were defeated in 1216, and after taking the throne, Konstantin divided Vladimir-Suzdal between his brothers, thereby creating three new appanage principalities: Rostov, Yaroslavl, and Pereyaslavl.

Following Konstantin's death in 1218, Yury returned to the throne and restored the primacy of Vladimir. The first five years of his reign was peaceful as his brothers and nephews showed no signs of animosity towards him. Yury continued his campaign against the Volga Bulgars, defeating them in 1220. The following year, he founded Nizhny Novgorod on the mouth of the Oka River. Yury also restored Vladimir's influence in Novgorod, where his brother Yaroslav defended the northwestern frontier against attacks by the Teutonic Knights and the Lithuanians. Smolensk's hegemony in Novgorod came to an end in 1221 and only princes from Vladimir-Suzdal were accepted and received. Yury remained on the throne of Vladimir until the Mongol invasions of 1237–1238.

=== Under Mongol suzerainty ===
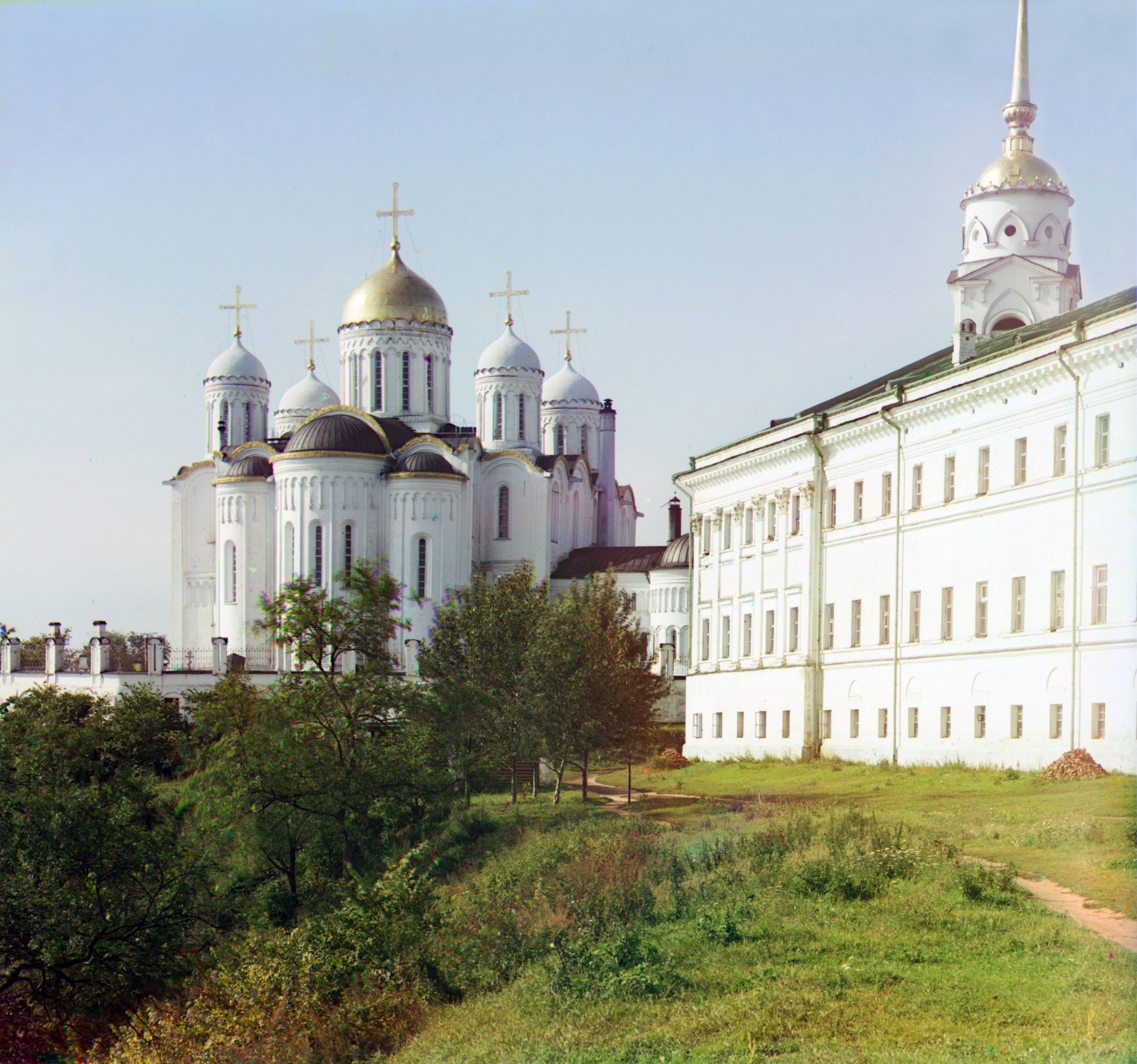
Assumption Cathedral in Vladimir was built in 1158–1160 and functioned as the mother church of Kievan Rus' in the 13th century.

While heavy tribute payments and the initial Mongol invasions did manage to cause much destruction to Vladimir-Suzdal, rule under the Mongols also brought wealth to the region, as Vladimir was able to access the Mongol's lucrative patronage of oriental trade.

None of the cities of the principality managed to regain the power of Kievan Rus' after the Mongol invasion. Vladimir became a vassal of the Mongol Empire, later succeeded by the Golden Horde, with the Grand Prince appointed by the Great Khan. Even the popular Alexander Nevsky of Pereslavl had to go to the Khan's capital in Karakorum to be installed as the Grand Prince in Vladimir. As many factions strove for power, the principality rapidly disintegrated into eleven tiny states: Moscow, Tver, Pereslavl, Rostov, Yaroslavl, Uglich, Belozersk, Kostroma, Nizhny Novgorod, Starodub-upon-Klyazma, and Yuriev-Polsky. All of them nominally acknowledged the suzerainty of the Grand Prince of Vladimir, but his effective authority became progressively weaker.

By the end of the century, only three cities—Moscow, Tver, and Nizhny Novgorod—still contended for the title of Grand Prince of Vladimir. Once installed, however, they chose to remain in their own cities rather than move to Vladimir. The Principality of Moscow gradually came to eclipse its rivals. The decision of Metropolitan Peter of Kiev and all Rus' to move his chair from Vladimir to Moscow in 1325 was another sign of Moscow's rising prominence. When the Tver Uprising of 1327 broke out, forces of Moscow and Nizhny Novgorod helped the Mongols crush it. By the end of the 1330s, Moscow had eclipsed Tver, which then descended inter-princely wars between the various appanages of Tver, particularly between Kashin and Mikulin. During the Great Troubles, Tver and Nizhny Novgorod-Suzdal both attempted to regain the title of grand prince of Vladimir, with Tver succeeding a few times, but since 1394, Moscow effectively inherited the title and controlled Vladimir thereafter, signifying the end of a separate Vladimirian principality.

Since that time, traditions of the old Principality of Rostov and the Grand Principality of Vladimir were both symbolically represented in various expanded titles of Grand Princes of Moscow, and later Russian Tsars and Emperors: up to 1917, they were all styled as rulers of various historical polities, including Vladimir and Rostov. Thus in Latin versions of those titles, the old Vladimirian and Rostovian polities were referred as Vladimiria and Rostovia.

== Culture ==
=== Suzdalian period ===
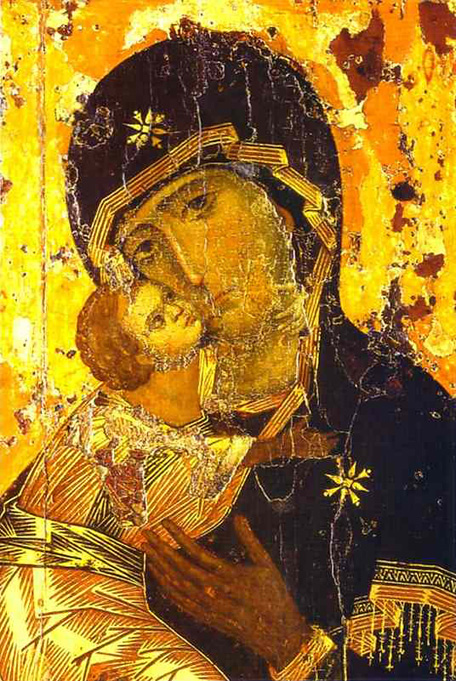
The veneration of the Theotokos as a holy protectress of Vladimir was introduced by Prince Andrew, who dedicated to Her many churches and installed in his palace a revered image, known as Theotokos of Vladimir.

As part of the Christian world, Rus' principalities gained a wide range of opportunities for developing their political and cultural ties not only with Byzantium but with the European countries, as well. By the end of the eleventh century, Rus' gradually fell under the influence of Roman architecture. Whitestone cathedrals, decorated with sculpture, appeared in the principality of Vladimir-Suzdal due to Andrey Bogolyubsky's invitation of architects from "all over the world". These cathedrals, however, are not identical to the edifices of Roman Catholic Europe and represent a synthesis of the Byzantine cruciform plan and cupolas with Roman whitestone construction and decorative technique. This mixture of Greek and Western European traditions was possible only in Kievan Rus'. One of its results was a famous architectural masterpiece of Vladimir, the Church of Pokrova na Nerli, a symbol of cultural originality of Suzdalia.

In the early Middle Ages, Rus' principalities were similar to other European countries culturally and in historical development. Later on, however, the Rus' polities and Europe began diverging due to a number of factors. The East-West Schism of 1054 was one of the reasons for this. Barely noticeable in the eleventh century, it became very obvious two centuries later during the resistance of the citizens of Novgorod to the Teutonic Knights. Also, by the middle of the twelfth century, the dominating influence of the Kievan Rus’ (some historians do not consider it possible to even call it a state in the modern sense of the word) began to wane. The famous Theotokos of Vladimir, an icon of the Virgin Mary, was moved to Vladimir. From this time on, almost every principality began forming its own architectural and art schools.

The invasion of Batu Khan and subsequent domination of Rus' lands by the Golden Horde was also a turning point in the history of Russian culture and statehood. Mongol rule imposed its principles of state on the northeastern Rus' principalities, which were very different from those of Western Europe. In particular, Russia adopted a principle of universal subordination and undivided authority.

=== Muscovite period ===
Rus' was only able to recover from the consequences of the Mongol invasion by the late thirteenth century. The first areas to recover were Novgorod and Pskov, which had been spared the Tatar raids. These city-states, with parliamentarian rule, created an original kind of culture under some influence from their western Baltic neighbours. In the early fourteenth century, leadership in the northeastern lands was transferred from the Principality of Vladimir to Moscow, which, in turn, would fight for leadership against Tver for another century. Moscow was a part of the Vladimir lands and functioned as one of the border fortresses of north-eastern Rus'. In 1324, Metropolitan Peter left Vladimir and settled down in Moscow, thus, transferring the residence of the Russian Orthodox Church (Metropolitan Maximus had moved the residence from Kiev to Vladimir not long before, in 1299). In the late fourteenth century, the principal object of worship of the "old" capital—the icon of the Theotokos of Vladimir—was transferred to Moscow. Vladimir became a model for Muscovy.

Emphasizing the succession, princes of Moscow took good care of Vladimir's sacred places. In the early fifteenth century, Andrei Rublev and Prokhor of Gorodets painted the Assumption (Uspensky) Cathedral. In the mid-1450s, they restored the Cathedral of St. George in Yuriev-Polsky under the supervision of Vasili Dmitriyevich Yermolin. The architecture of Muscovy and its surrounding lands in the fourteenth to early fifteenth centuries, usually referred to as early Muscovite architecture, inherited the technique of whitestone construction and typology of four-pillar cathedrals from Vladimir. Art historians, however, notice that early Muscovite architecture was influenced by the Balkans and European Gothic architecture.

Russian painting of the late fourteenth and early fifteenth centuries is characterized by two major influences, namely those of Byzantine artist Feofan Grek and Russian icon-painter Andrei Rublev. Feofan's style is distinguished by its monochromatic palette and uncommon expressiveness of laconic blots and lines, which send a message of a complex symbolic implication, close to the then widely-spread doctrine of hesychasm, from Byzantium. The soft-coloured icons of Rublev are closer to the late Byzantine painting style of the Balkan countries in the fifteenth century.

The late fourteenth century was marked by one of the most important events in Russian history. In 1380, Dmitry Donskoy and his army dealt the first serious blow to the Golden Horde. Sergii Radonezhsky, the founder and hegumen of Troitse-Sergiyev monastery, played an exceptional role in this victory. The name of Saint Sergii, who became the protector and patron of Muscovy, has an enormous significance in Russian culture. Radonezhsky himself and his followers founded more than two hundred monasteries, which would become the basis for the so-called "monastic colonization" of the little-developed northern lands. The Life of Sergii Radonezhsky was written by one of the outstanding writers of that time, Epifaniy the Wise. Andrei Rublev painted his Trinity, the greatest masterpiece of the Russian Middle Ages, for the cathedral of Sergii's monastery.

Mid-fifteenth-century Muscovy is known for bloody internecine wars for the Moscow seat of the Grand Prince. Ivan III managed to unite the Russian lands around Moscow (at the cost of ravaging Novgorod and Pskov) only by the end of the fifteenth century, and put an end to Russia's subordination to the Golden Horde after the Great standing on the Ugra river of 1480. The river was later poetically dubbed the "Virgin Belt" (Poyas Bogoroditsy). This event marked the birth of the sovereign Russian state, headed by the Grand Prince of Moscow.

== Bibliography ==
- "Владимирское великое княжество" . Brockhaus and Efron Encyclopedic Dictionary (in Russian). 1906.
- Channon, John; Hudson, Robert (1995). The Penguin Historical Atlas of Russia. Penguin. ISBN 978-0-14-051326-4.
- Cherniavsky, Michael (15 May 2017). "Khan or Basileus: An Aspect of Russian Medieval Political Theory". In Shepard, Jonathan (ed.). The Expansion of Orthodox Europe: Byzantium, the Balkans and Russia. Routledge. pp. 403–420. ISBN 978-1-351-89005-2.
- Crummey, Robert O. (6 June 2014). The Formation of Muscovy 1300 - 1613. Routledge. ISBN 978-1-317-87200-9.
- Dmytryshyn, Basil (1977). A history of Russia. Englewood Cliffs, NJ: Prentice-Hall. ISBN 978-0133921342.
- Favereau, Marie; Pochekaev, Roman Yu. (2023). "The Golden Horde, c. 1260–1502". The Cambridge History of the Mongol Empire. Cambridge University Press. pp. 243–318. ISBN 978-1-107-11648-1.
- Feldbrugge, Ferdinand J. M. (2 October 2017). A History of Russian Law: From Ancient Times to the Council Code (Ulozhenie) of Tsar Aleksei Mikhailovich of 1649. BRILL. ISBN 978-90-04-35214-8.
- Fennell, John L. (2014a). A History of the Russian Church to 1488. Routledge. ISBN 978-1-317-89720-0.
- Fennell, John (2014b) [1983]. The Crisis of Medieval Russia, 1200–1304. Longman History of Russia. Routledge. ISBN 978-0-582-48150-3.
- Fennell, John (15 November 2023). The Emergence of Moscow, 1304–1359. Univ of California Press. ISBN 978-0-520-34759-5.
- Franklin, Simon; Shepard, Jonathan (6 June 2014). The Emergence of Rus 750-1200. Routledge. ISBN 978-1-317-87224-5.
- Gorsky, Anton A. (1996). Русские земли в XIII-XIV веках: пути политического развития [The Russian lands in the 13th–14th centuries] (in Russian). Институт российской истории РАН. ISBN 978-5-201-00608-2.
- Martin, Janet (2007). Medieval Russia: 980–1584. Second Edition. E-book. Cambridge: Cambridge University Press. ISBN 978-0-511-36800-4.
- Riasanovsky, Nicholas V.; Steinberg, Mark D. (2019). A history of Russia (Ninth ed.). New York: Oxford University Press. ISBN 978-0190645588.
- Venning, Timothy (30 June 2023). A Compendium of Medieval World Sovereigns. Taylor & Francis. ISBN 978-1-000-86633-9.
- Vodoff, Vladimir (2000a). "Russia, North-East". In Vauchez, André; Dobson, Richard Barrie; Lapidge, Michael (eds.). Encyclopedia of the Middle Ages. Vol. 2. James Clarke. p. 1268. ISBN 978-0-227-67931-9.
- Vodoff, Vladimir (2000b). "Vladimir". In Vauchez, André; Dobson, Richard Barrie; Lapidge, Michael (eds.). Encyclopedia of the Middle Ages. Vol. 2. James Clarke. pp. 1529–1530. ISBN 978-0-227-67931-9.
- Voronin, N. N. (1986). "Vladimir-Suzdal, Principality of". In Wieczynski, Joseph L. (ed.). The Modern Encyclopedia of Russian and Soviet History. Vol. 42. Academic International Press. pp. 168–173. ISBN 0875690645.
