= Konstantin of Rostov =

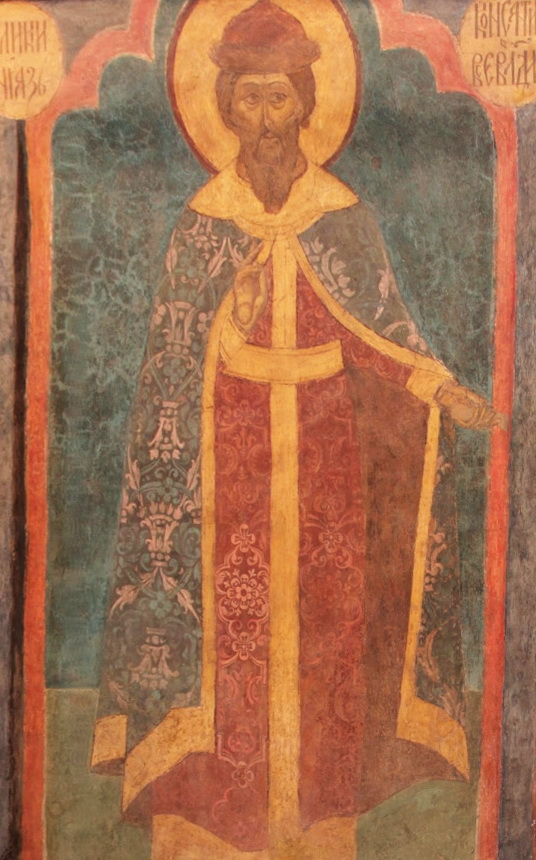

Grand Prince of Vladimir
- Reign: 1216–1218
- Predecessor: Yuri II of Vladimir
- Successor: Yuri II of Vladimir
- Born: 18 May 1186; Rostov
- Died: 2 February 1218 (aged 31); Vladimir, Russia
- Spouse: Maria Mstislavna of Smolensk
- Issue: Vasilko Konstantinovich of Rostov; Vsevolod Konstantinovich of Yaroslavl; Vladimir Konstantinovich of Uglich
- House: Rurik
- Father: Vsevolod the Big Nest
- Mother: Maria Shvarnovna
- Religion: Eastern Orthodoxy

Konstantin Vsevolodovich (Russian: Константи́н Все́володович) (18 May 1186 in Rostov – 2 February 1218) was the eldest son of Vsevolod the Big Nest and Maria Shvarnovna.

He was the prince of Novgorod from 1206 to 1207. In 1207 Vsevolod sent him to rule the towns of Rostov and Yaroslavl. As a consequence of family strife, his father disinherited Konstantin on his deathbed and bequeathed his capital Vladimir to his younger son, Yuri II. Before his death, the grand prince divided his territories between Konstantin and his brothers, and upon his death the Vladimir-Suzdal war of succession (1212–1216) broke out between them. In the Battle of Lipitsa (1216), Konstantin and his ally Mstislav of Novgorod soundly defeated Yuri and occupied Vladimir.

Upon Konstantin's death in 1218, Yuri returned to the throne. Konstantin's descendants, meanwhile, retained the towns of Rostov and Yaroslavl, where they would reign until the late 15th century. Numerous Russian princely families descend from Konstantin's line, and he is remembered for building the new Assumption Cathedral in Rostov and three brick cathedrals in Yaroslavl.

== Sources ==
- "Константин Всеволодович, князь ростовский и владимирский" . Brockhaus and Efron Encyclopedic Dictionary (in Russian). 1906.

Regnal titles
| Preceded by Yuri II | Grand Prince of Vladimir; 1216–1218 | Succeeded by Yuri II |
