= Galich =

Galich may refer to:

- Galich, Russia, a town in Kostroma Oblast, Russia
- Galich, alternative spelling of Halych, a town in Ivano-Frankivsk Oblast, Ukraine
- Galich, alternative spelling of Halych, Ternopil Oblast, a village in Ternopil Oblast, Ukraine
- Galich (surname)

== See also ==
- Galič (surname), a Slovene surname
- Galić, a South Slavic surname
- Kingdom of Galicia–Volhynia, a large Ruthenian Duchy which existed in the 13th and 14th centuries
- Kingdom of Galicia and Lodomeria, a subdivision of the Austrian Empire from 1772 to 1918
- Galicia (Eastern Europe), a historical region in East Central Europe, currently divided between Poland and Ukraine
- Galicia (Spain)
- Galicia (disambiguation), terms related to Galicia
- Halich (disambiguation)
