= Halich =

Halich may refer to:

- Halich, alternative spelling of Halych, a town in Ivano-Frankivsk Oblast, Ukraine
- Halich, alternative spelling of Halych, Ternopil Oblast, a village in Ternopil Oblast, Ukraine

== See also ==
- Kingdom of Galicia–Volhynia, a large Ruthenian Duchy which existed in the 13th and 14th centuries
- Kingdom of Galicia and Lodomeria, a subdivision of the Austrian Empire from 1772 to 1918
- Galicia (Eastern Europe), a historical region in East Central Europe, currently divided between Poland and Ukraine
- Galicia (Spain)
- Galicia (disambiguation), terms related to Galicia
- Galich (disambiguation)
