= Galacia =

Galacia is a misspelling. The correct spelling might be:

- Galicia (disambiguation)
- Galatia (disambiguation)
