= Halychian =

Halychian may refer to:

- something or someone related to the city of Halych, in modern Ukraine
- Halychian Principality, an East Slavic medieval state, centered in Halych
- Halychian-Volhynian Principality, an East Slavic medieval state, uniting Halych and Volhynia
- Halychian Wars, series of medieval wars in the region of Halych
- Halychian Metropolitanate, an Eastern Orthodox Metropolitanate of Halych
- Ukrainian Catholic Major Archeparchy of Kyiv–Galicia, a diocese of the Ukrainian Byzantine Catholic Church
- Halychian Land (ziemia), a province of the early modern Kingdom of Poland
- Halych Raion, former administrative region, centered in the city of Halych
- Halychian-Volhynian Chronicle, medieval East Slavic chronicle

== See also ==
- Galician (disambiguation)
- Galicia (disambiguation)
