= Yaroslav I =

Yaroslav I is the name of:

- Yaroslav I the Wise (ca. 970–1054), prince of Kiev
- Yaroslav I of Halych (ca. 1135–1187)
