= Vladimir Yaroslavich =

Vladimir Yaroslavich or Volodimer Iaroslavich may refer to:

- Vladimir of Novgorod (1020–1052), prince of Novgorod from 1036 to 1052
- Vladimir II Yaroslavich, prince of Galicia (Halych) during 1187–1189 and 1189–1198/99
