= Yaroslav Vladimirovich =

Yaroslav Vladimirovich may refer to:

- Yaroslav the Wise, Grand Prince of Kievan Rus, son of Vladimir I of Kiev
- Yaroslav Osmomysl, Prince of Halych, son of Volodymyrko of Halych
