= St. Pantaleon Church, Shevchenkove =

Church building in Ukraine

St. Pantaleon Church
- Церква Святого Пантелеймона
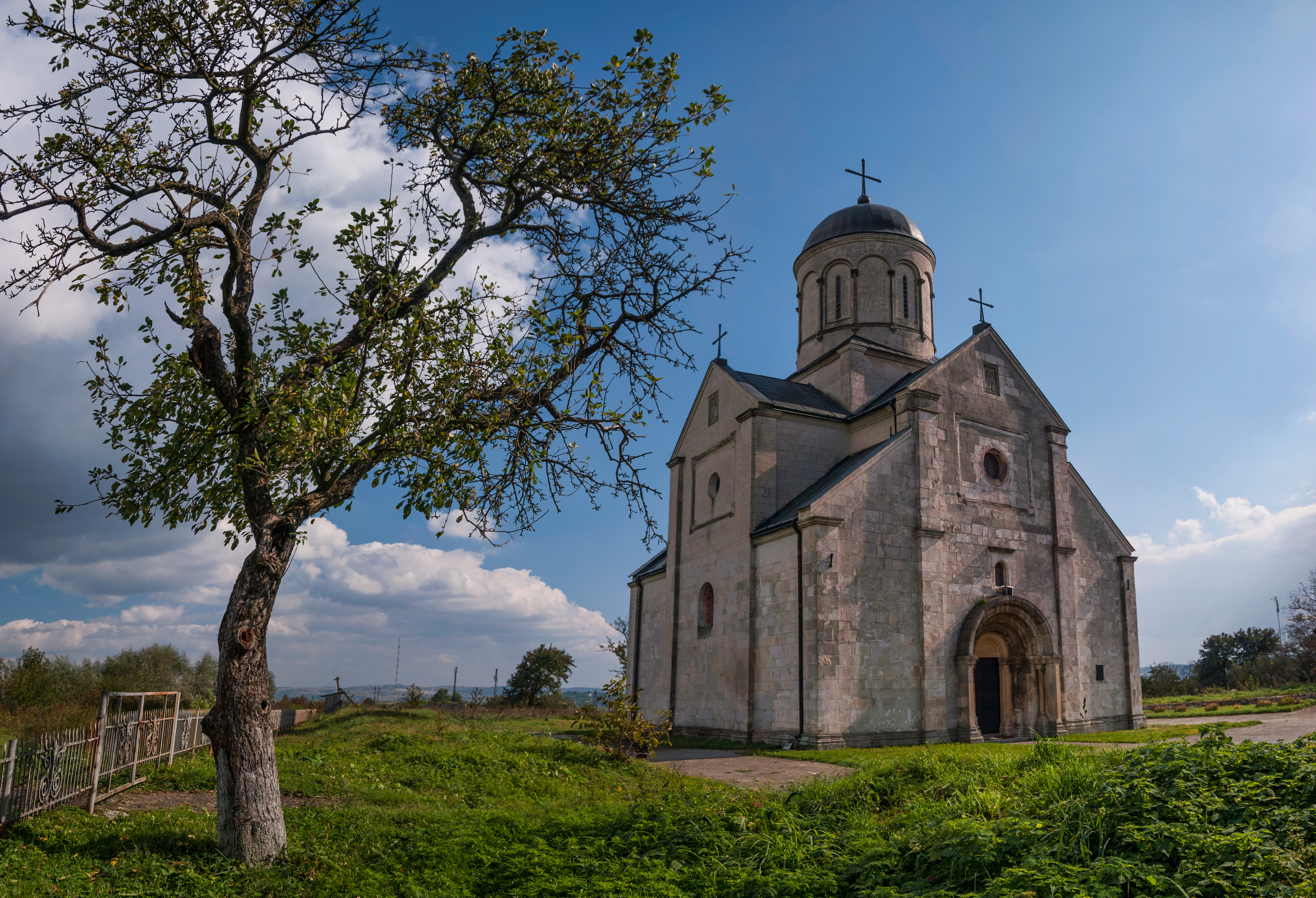
- The church in 2010
- St. Pantaleon Church
- 49°08′01″N 24°41′40″E
- Location: Shevchenkove, Ivano-Frankivsk Oblast
- Country: Ukraine
- Denomination: Ukrainian Greek Catholic Church

History
- Founder: Roman the Great or Vladimir II Yaroslavich
- Dedication: Saint Pantaleon

Architecture
- Style: Galician school
- Completed: 12th century

Immovable Monument of National Significance of Ukraine
- Official name: Церква Святого Пантелеймона (St. Pantaleon Church)
- Type: Architecture
- Reference no.: 090023/1-Н

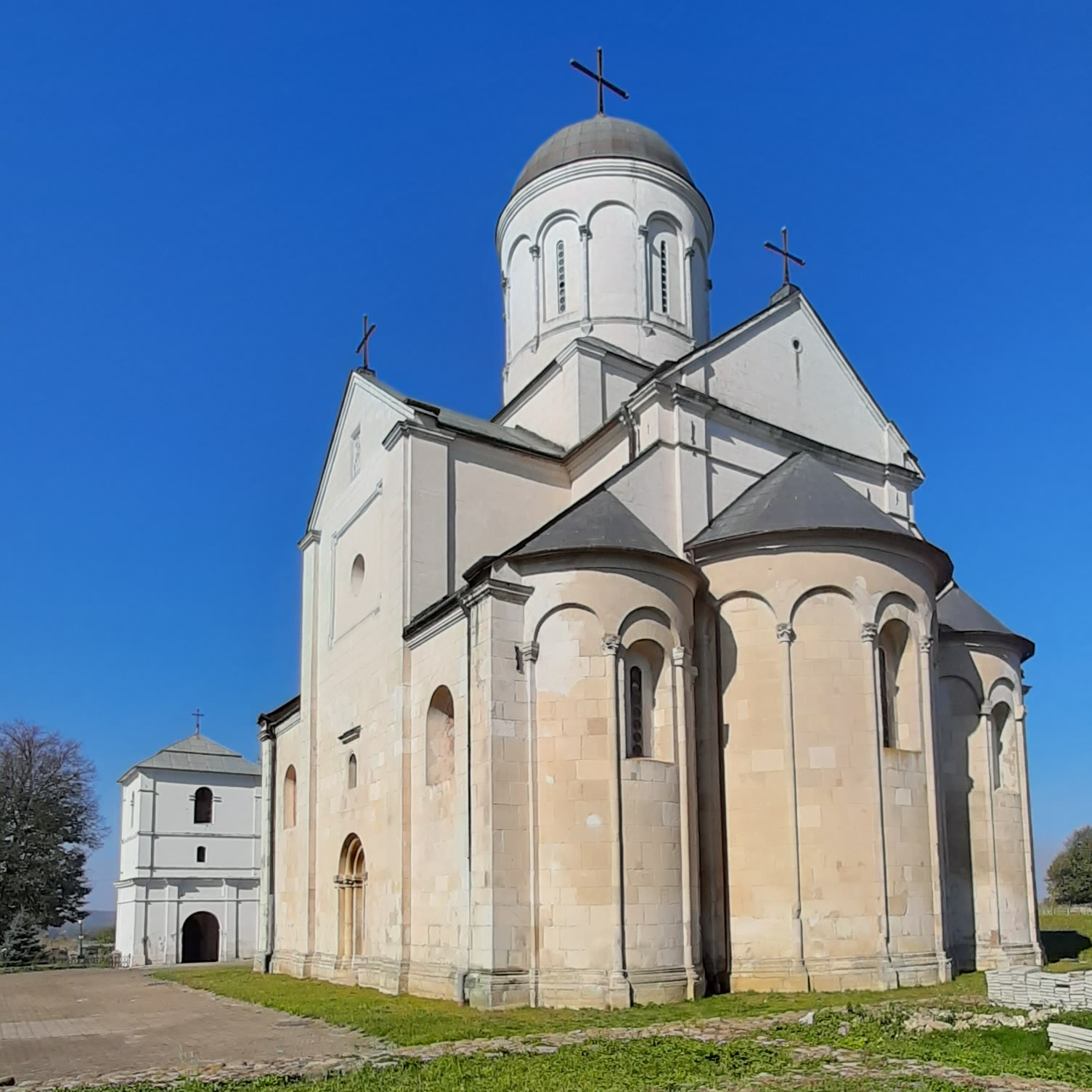
Southeastern view of the apse

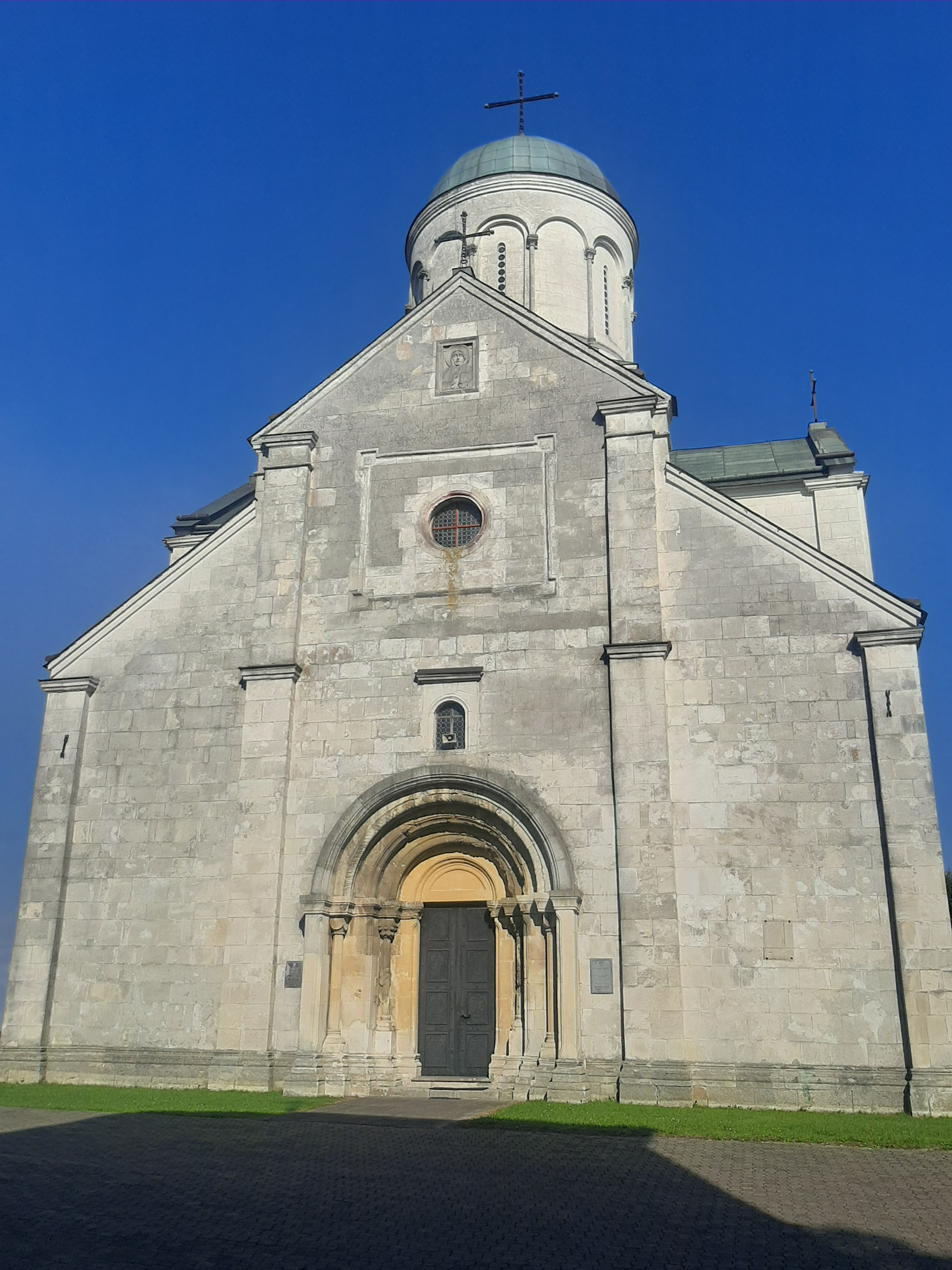
Western façade

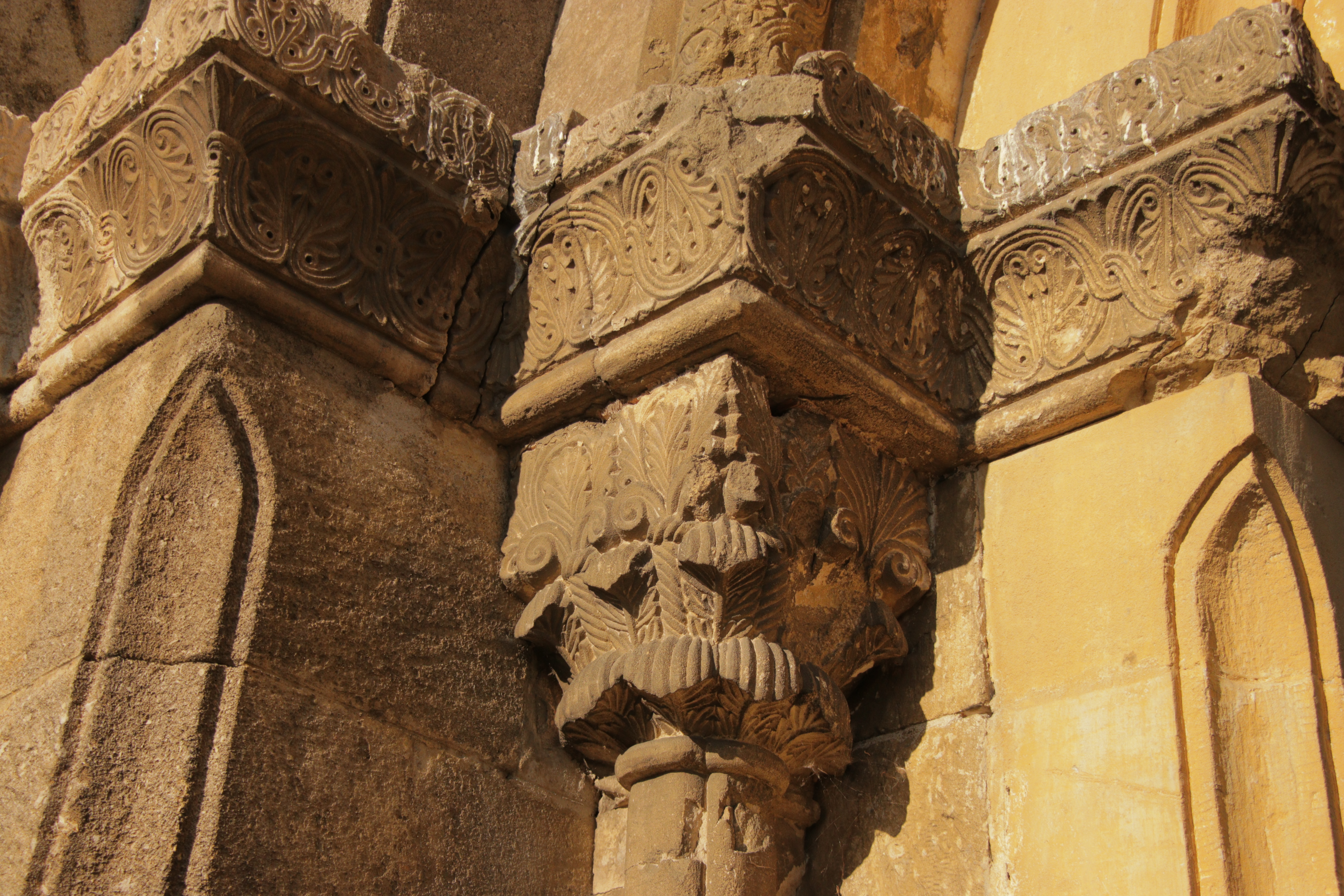
Romanesque carving on the cornice of the main portal

St. Pantaleon Church (Ukrainian: Церква Святого Пантелеймона) is a Romanesque–Byzantine style church in Ukraine, in the village of Shevchenkove, Ivano-Frankivsk Oblast. The only and oldest of the churches of the Galician, and later Galician–Volhynian Principality, which has survived to this day and represents the Galician school of architecture of the medieval period. It is an architectural monument of national significance. It is a monumental cross-vaulted church with examples of exquisite white stone carving and numerous drawings and graffiti on the walls. Located near modern Halych. Belongs to the Ukrainian Greek Catholic Church. Built in the late 1180s–1194 by Prince Volodymyr Yaroslavych as an Orthodox church. During 1199–1205, the palace of Prince Roman Mstislavich was located near the church, where the future king of Rus', Daniel, and his brother Vasylko, were probably born. In the 14th century it was converted into the Roman Catholic Church of St. Stanislaus. From 25 May 1596 it belonged to the Franciscan Order. It was restored in 1916–1938, 1965 and 1996–1998. In 1991 it was transferred to the Greek Catholics. It is part of the National Reserve "Ancient Halych", and is the oldest building of Ivano-Frankivsk Oblast and the wider region of Ciscarpathia.

== History ==
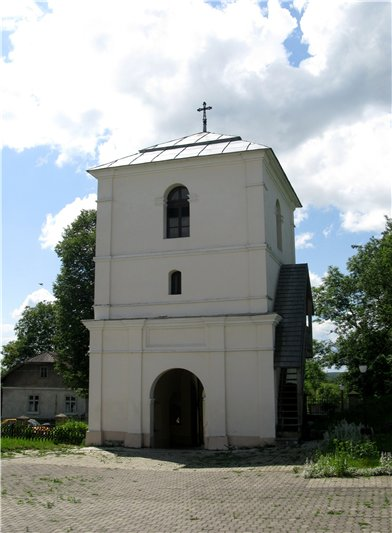
Bell tower (built in 1611)

In 1194, at the entrance to Ancient Halych, on Vynohradna Hora, Prince Volodymyr Yaroslavych built a great temple. Now this area lies within the village of Shevchenkove (formerly Stanislav), located 7 kilometers west of Halych, at the confluence of the Limnytsia River and the Dniester.

During the years 1200–1213, according to historian Myroslav Voloshchuk, one of the greatest Christian relics was located in the Church of St. Pantaleon — a fragment of the Life-Giving Cross, known today as the Cross of Emperor Manuel. The Tree of Life arrived in the capital of Halych as part of the wedding train of the second wife of Roman Mstislavich. Now the Cross of Emperor Manuel is kept among the relics of Notre Dame Cathedral in Paris.

In the second half of the 13th century, Halych lost its capital status and the church began to decline. In 1367, the church passed to the Catholics, who transformed it into the Cathedral Church of St. Stanislaus. The monument retained this name until 1912. Twice a year — on May 8 (St. Stanislaus' Day) and August 9 (St. Pantaleon's Day) — divine services were held here.

In 1575, the church was ruined by the Tatars, and it stood empty for 20 years.

In 1595, the church was handed over to the Franciscans, who rebuilt it into a Baroque basilica in 1598–1611, and also built a monastery complex and defensive ramparts around it. At the same time, a bell tower was erected on the axis of the main entrance to the church.

In 1676, the church was damaged during a Turkish campaign in Halych. The monument was greatly damaged by a fire in 1802 and cannon fire during World War I.

During the restoration of 1916–1938, the church was almost restored to its previous appearance, with the exception of the signature. The main portal also remained unrestored. In the interior of the church, the plaster was removed from the walls and the hewn stone was exposed. At that time, traces of fresco painting were discovered on the lower layer of plaster, and graffiti on the stone blocks.

The church building was protected as an architectural monument of the Ukrainian SSR (No. 248). In 2018, the church was recognized as part of cultural heritage site of national importance, which was included in the State Register of Immovable Monuments of Ukraine.

The visit to the temple on 14 April 1991, by Cardinal Myroslav Ivan Lubachivsky of the UGCC gave impetus to the revival of the church.

In 1995–1998, the church was rebuilt (architect Ivan Mohytych) and it received the current appearance, which is as close as possible to the appearance of traditional white-stone churches of the princely era. On 9 August 1998 it was reconsecrated as a Greek Catholic church of the parish of the village of Shevchenkove.

== Research ==
Scientific research on the Church of St. Panteleimon began in the middle of the 19th century. The first scientist known to us who examined the shrine in 1850 was Antin Petrushevych (1821–1913). This famous Ukrainian resident of Krylos and scientist repeatedly visited the church, which at that time functioned as the Church of St. Stanislaus, near which a Franciscan monastery was built.

In 1881, Petrushevych published the monograph "Historical information about the St. Pantaleon Church near the city of Halych". In this work, the author covers the history of the church from ancient times to the capture of Halych by Casimir III in 1349. The work is structured in the form of questions and answers in order to thus cover all the discussion issues. The scientist notes that the church was built in the Romanesque style, which is what allows the first researcher of the church to call Daniel Romanovych the founder of the shrine, since Daniel had close diplomatic ties with the Latin West, where until the middle of the 13th century, the Romanesque style of building sacred monuments was widespread. That is why the extreme limit of dating the church is 1240. In addition, the researcher sees the similarity of the architectural forms of the Church of John in Kholm and the St. Pantaleon Church in Halych, and this is another argument in favor of King Danylo Romanovych.

Petrushevych also spoke about the craftsmen who built St. Pantaleon Church. The identity of the main portal of the Galician church with the Naimartskirche church of this period in the German town of Merzenburg, according to the researcher, indicates that the architects were invited from German lands.

Antin Petrushevych was also the first researcher to draw attention to the graffiti he found on the walls of the then church. He discovered two Latin inscriptions and two Cyrillic symbols there. However, already in 1878 the scientist was unable to find them, since they were plastered over by order of the guardian of the Franciscan monastery.

The next researcher of the church was the Polish historian, art critic, graduate of the Krakow Academy of Sciences and Arts (Akademia Umiejętności) Władysław Łuszczkiewicz (1828–1900). It was he who drew attention to the original style of construction, architectural carvings and numerous graffiti. His merit was that he was the first to perform full-scale measurements and drawings of the monument, conducted a thorough examination of the St. Pantaleon Church and described the carved details of the structure that interested him, starting with the style of construction and ending with the architectural decoration. The most positive was the conclusion of the Polish researcher regarding the unambiguous dating of the monument to the princely era. Moreover, Łuszczkiewicz was convinced that the Church of St. Panteleimon was rebuilt from the previously built Assumption Cathedral. At the same time, the scientist convincingly identified the characteristic features of the princely era inherent in the Galician church, thereby proving once again that the temple was originally built in the Romanesque style, but during its existence it absorbed the styles of the eras it experienced. The scientist also described in detail the area around the shrine, taking into account the surrounding villages.

In 1909, Y. Pelensky, while examining the St. Pantaleon Church, found numerous inscriptions from the 13th–17th centuries on its facades. One of them contains a date corresponding to 1194 and indicates that the church was built before this date. This inscription is located on the southern facade of the church, near the third pilaster at a height of 1.50 m from the ground. The text of the inscription consists of 8 lines scratched on a stone block with a sharp object. After deciphering it, the researcher concluded that the founder of the temple was the Galicia–Volhynia ruler Roman Mstislavich, who built this church in honor of his grandfather, the Kiev prince Iziaslav, whose Christian name was Pantaleon.

Stratigraphic observations on certain parts of the church's territory show that St. Panteleimon Church was built on a previously undeveloped territory. The status of the church has not yet been determined, whether it was a monastery church (as evidenced by the construction of the church, which is characteristic of Cistercian architecture), or a princely church with the residence of Galician rulers.

The Doctor of Sciences and historian Oleksandr Holovko suggests that Prince Roman Mstislavich, who had his residence nearby, could have been buried in the church.

== Architecture ==
St. Pantaleon Church combines features of Kievan Rus' and Romanesque architecture. It is a four-column cross-shaped temple, in which a round dome with a cupola rises on spring arches resting on pillars.

The richest in form and decoration is the western portal. It protrudes significantly beyond the plane of the façade wall and its forms resemble prospective portals in the Romanesque architecture of Western Europe. The portal is decorated with two pairs of columns with capitals. The shafts of the columns, which are closer to the entrance, are decorated with knots in the middle. On the edges of the plinths, which are under the bases, the so-called "frogs" are carved. These columns are authentic, they were the only ones not destroyed by artillery fire in 1915.

The southern portal is more restrained in terms of sculptural decoration, but its architectural solution is the same as that of the western one. The shape of the ledges corresponds to the shape of the archivolt.

The apses are decorated with thin half-columns, on which the arcature belt rests. The carved capitals of the central apse have a varied pattern. These capitals and the arcature frieze are authentic.

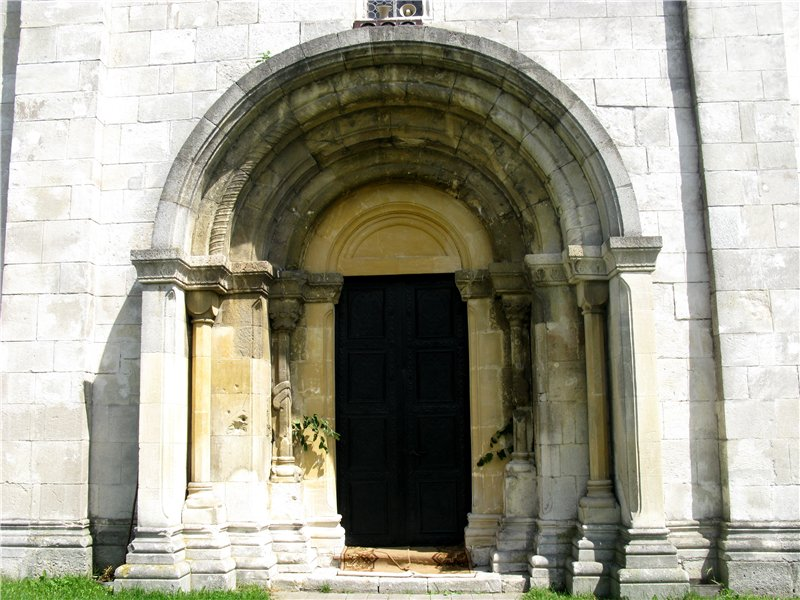
Carved western entrance

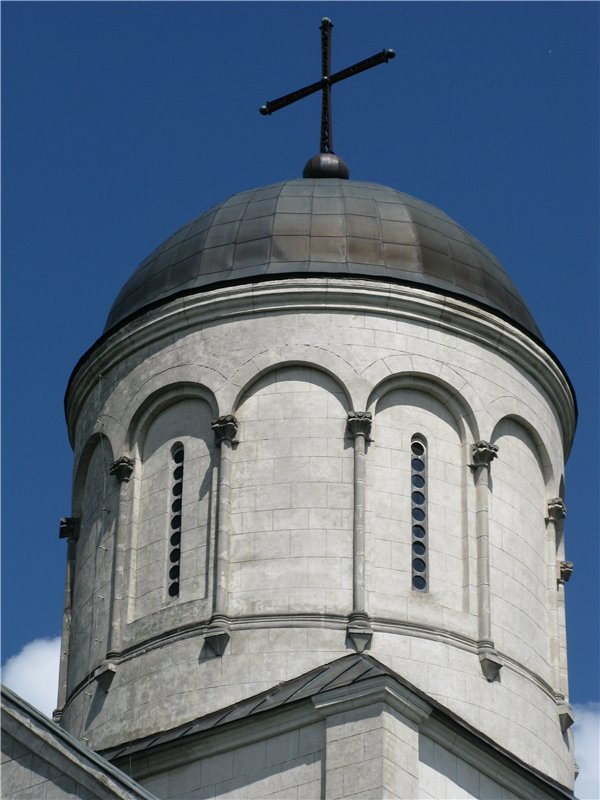
Dome

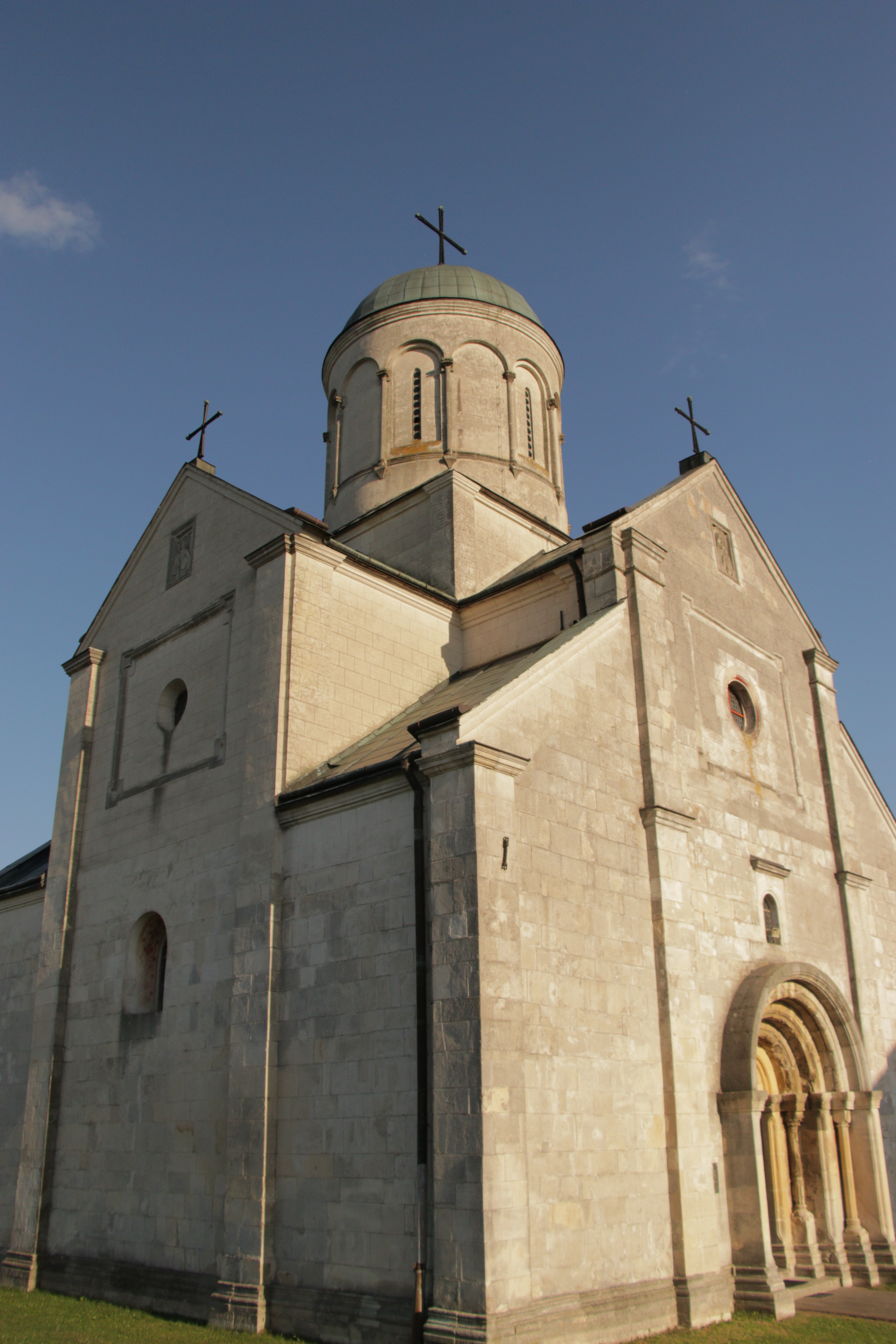
Northwestern side of the church

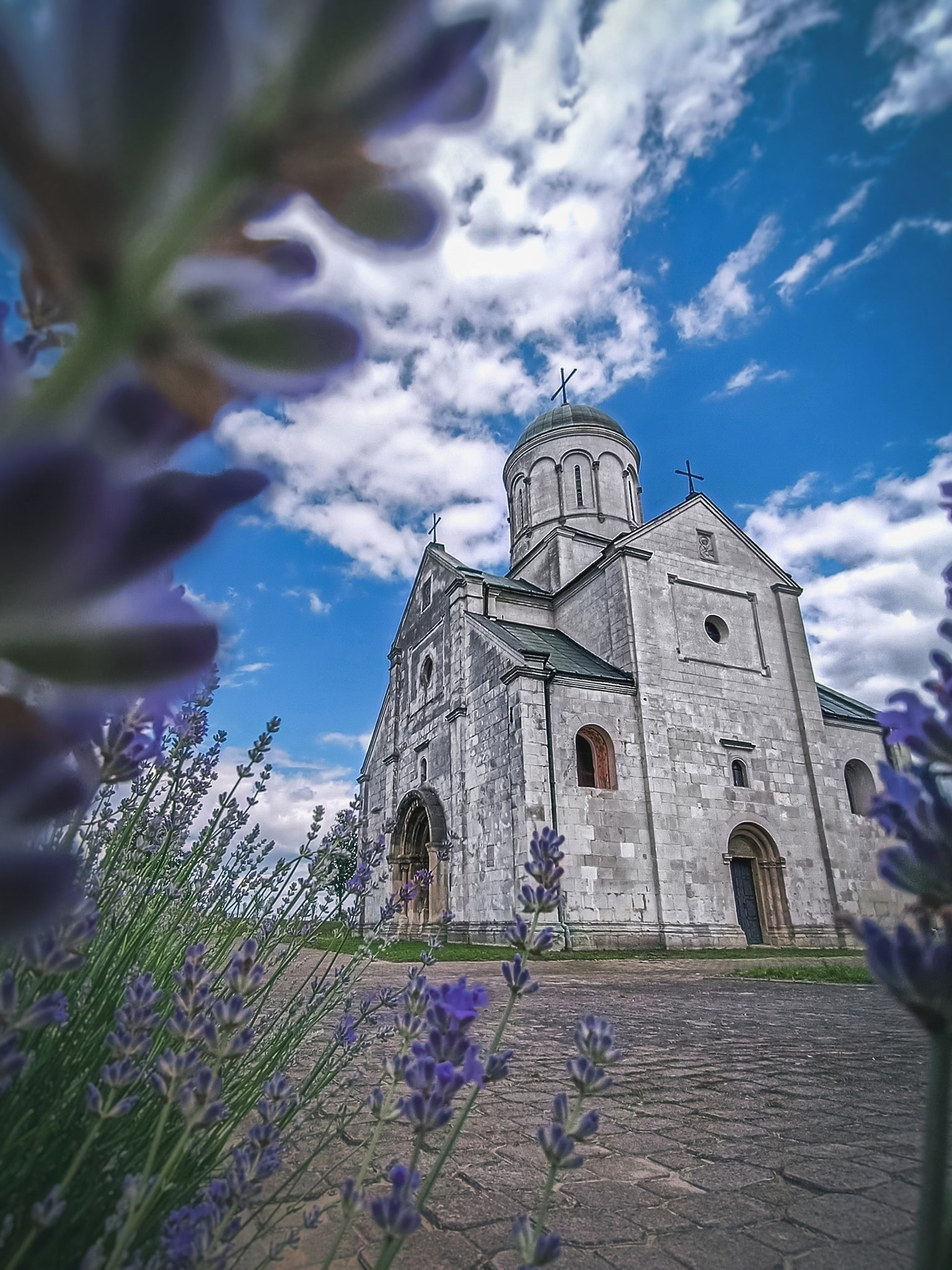
Southwestern side

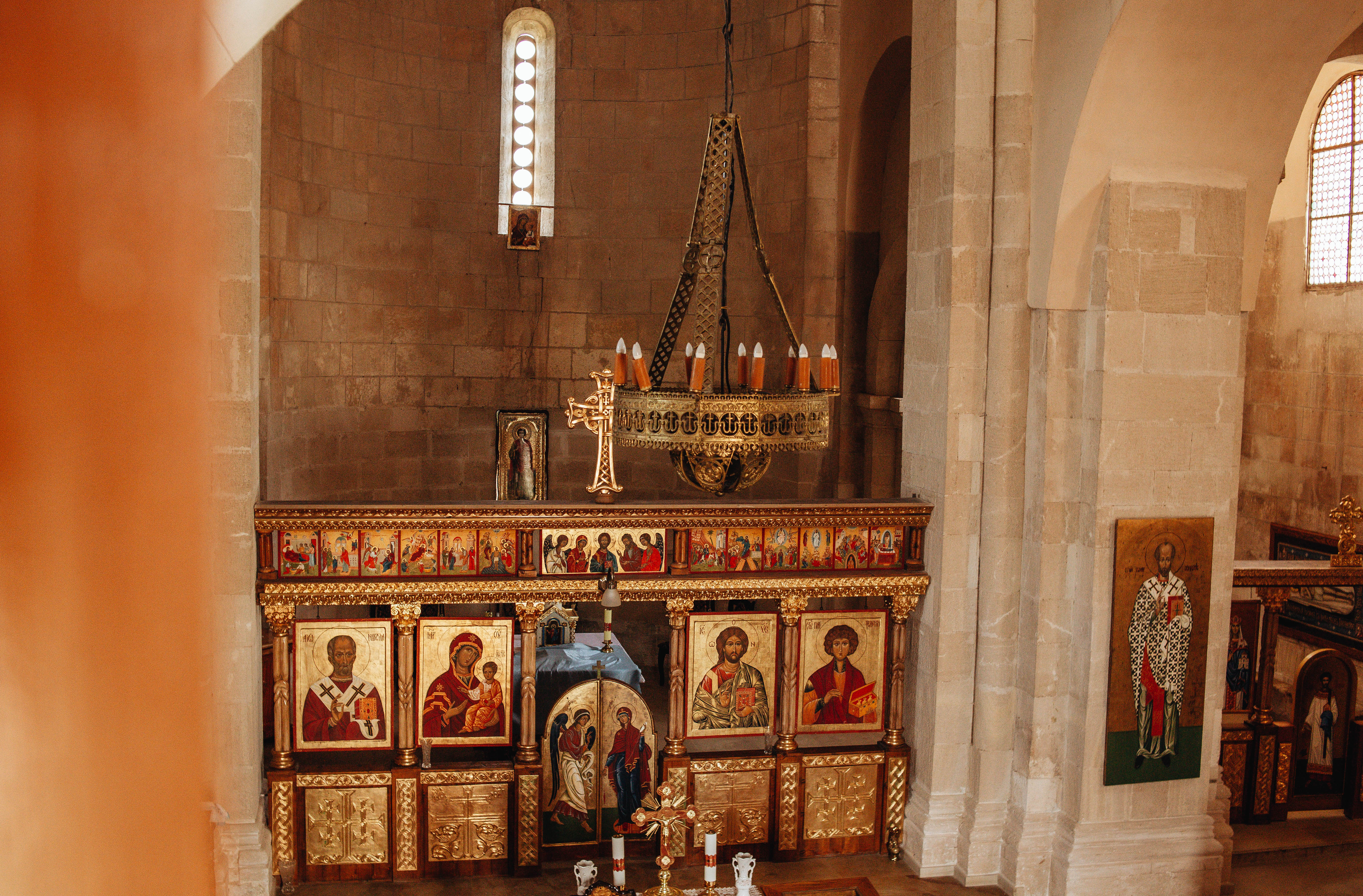
Interior with a restored altar partition (designed by Natalia Slipchenko)

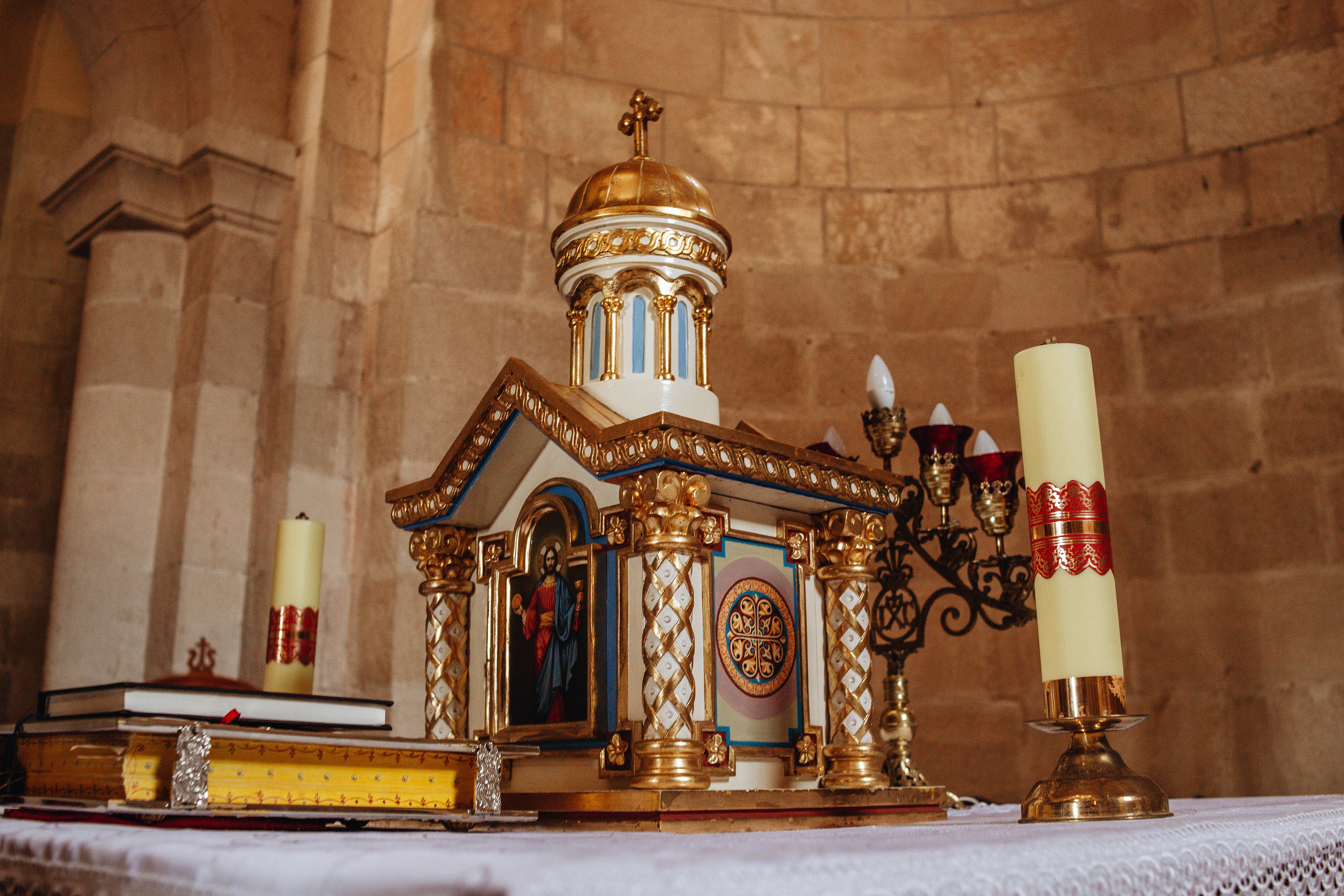

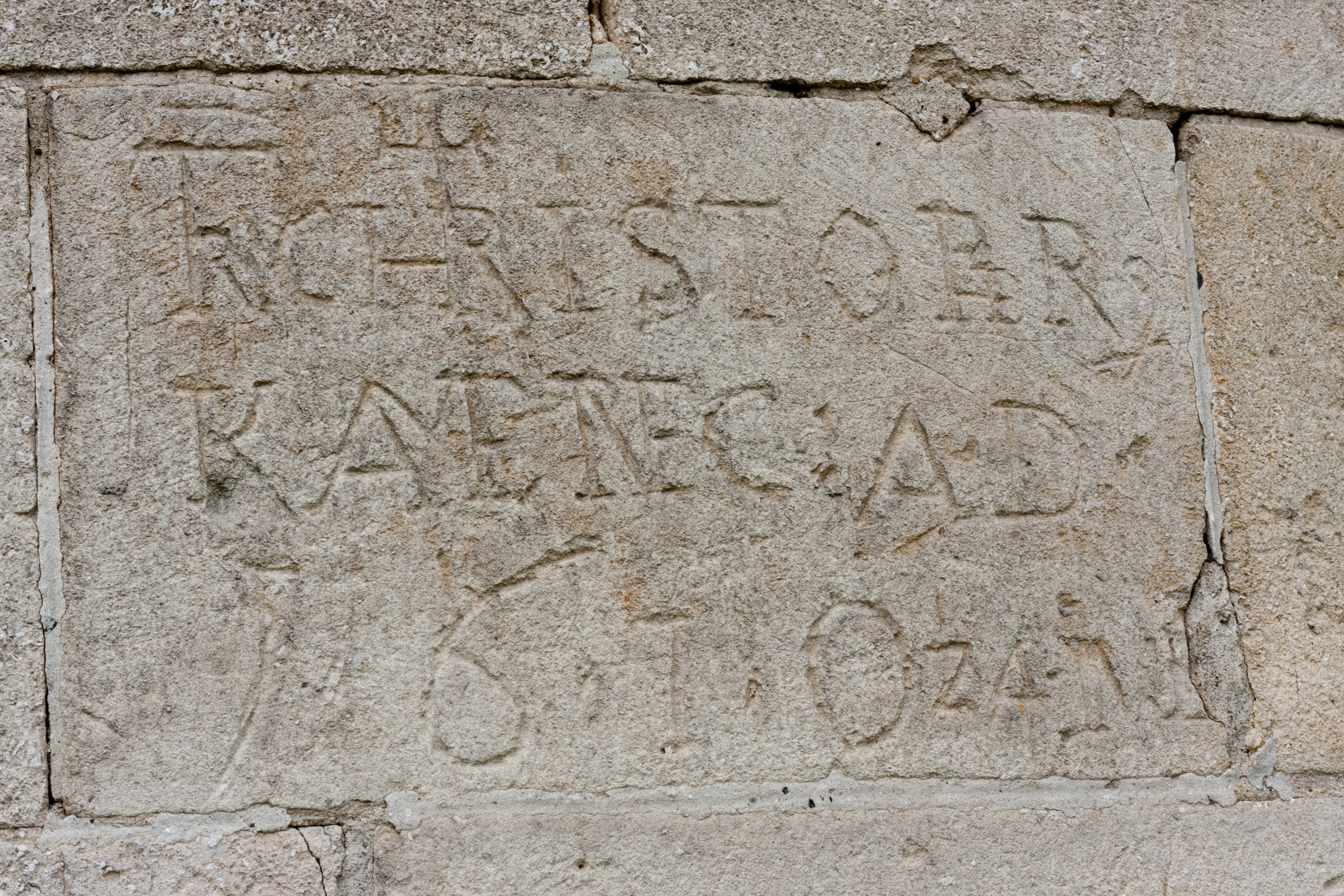
One of the many inscriptions in the church

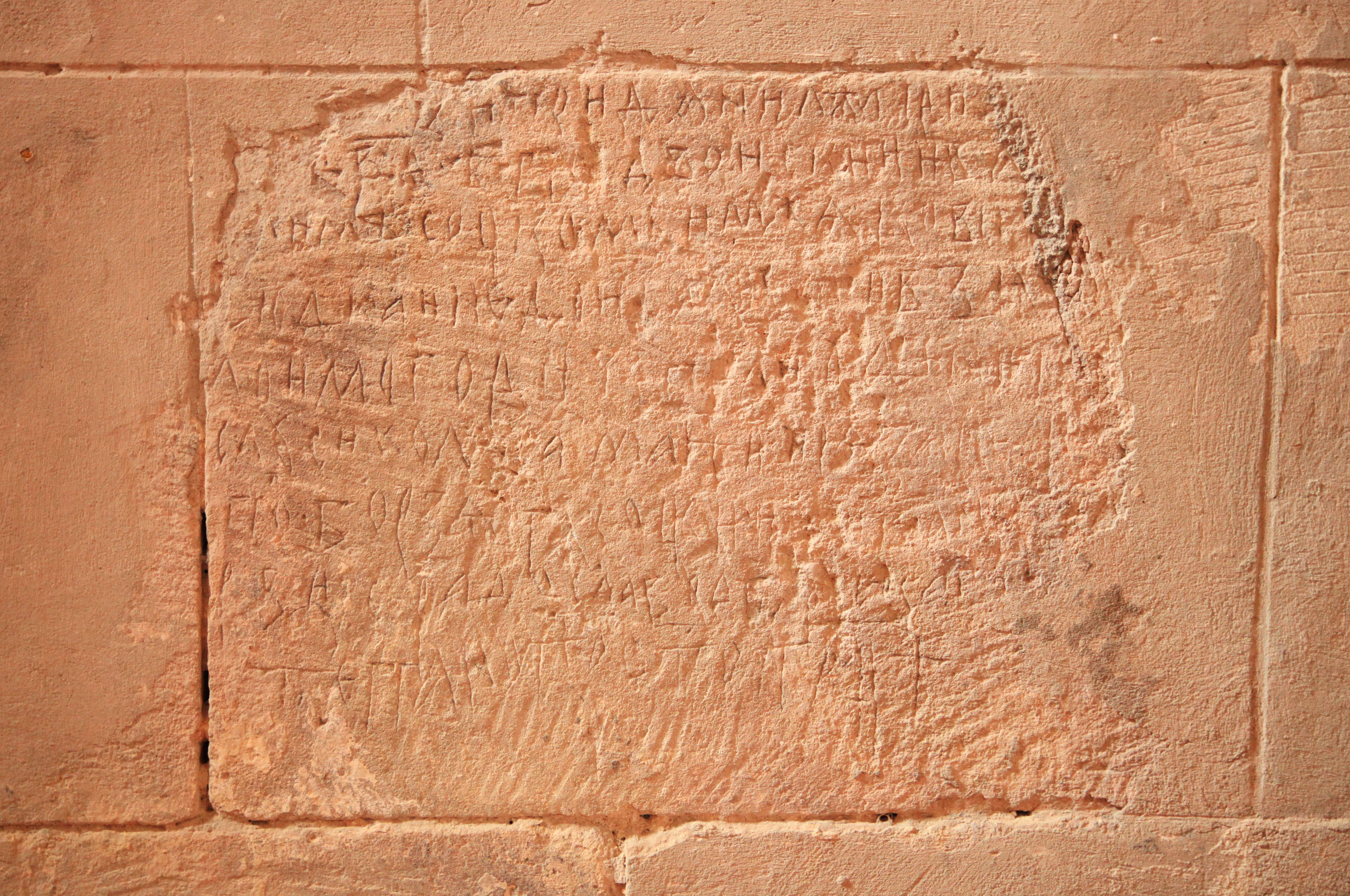
Inscription

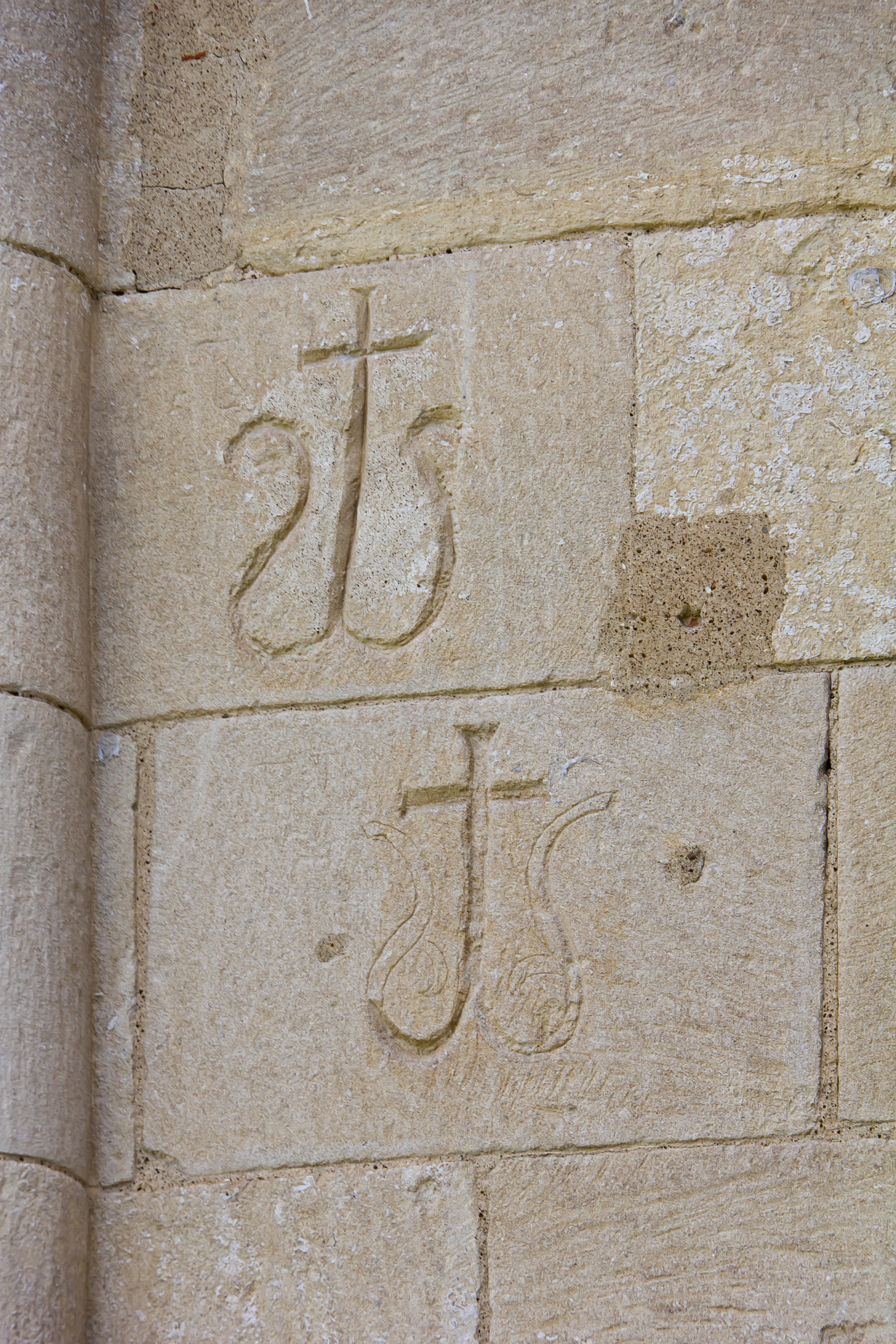
Two symbols. This design was adopted as the coat of arms of Halych in 1998.

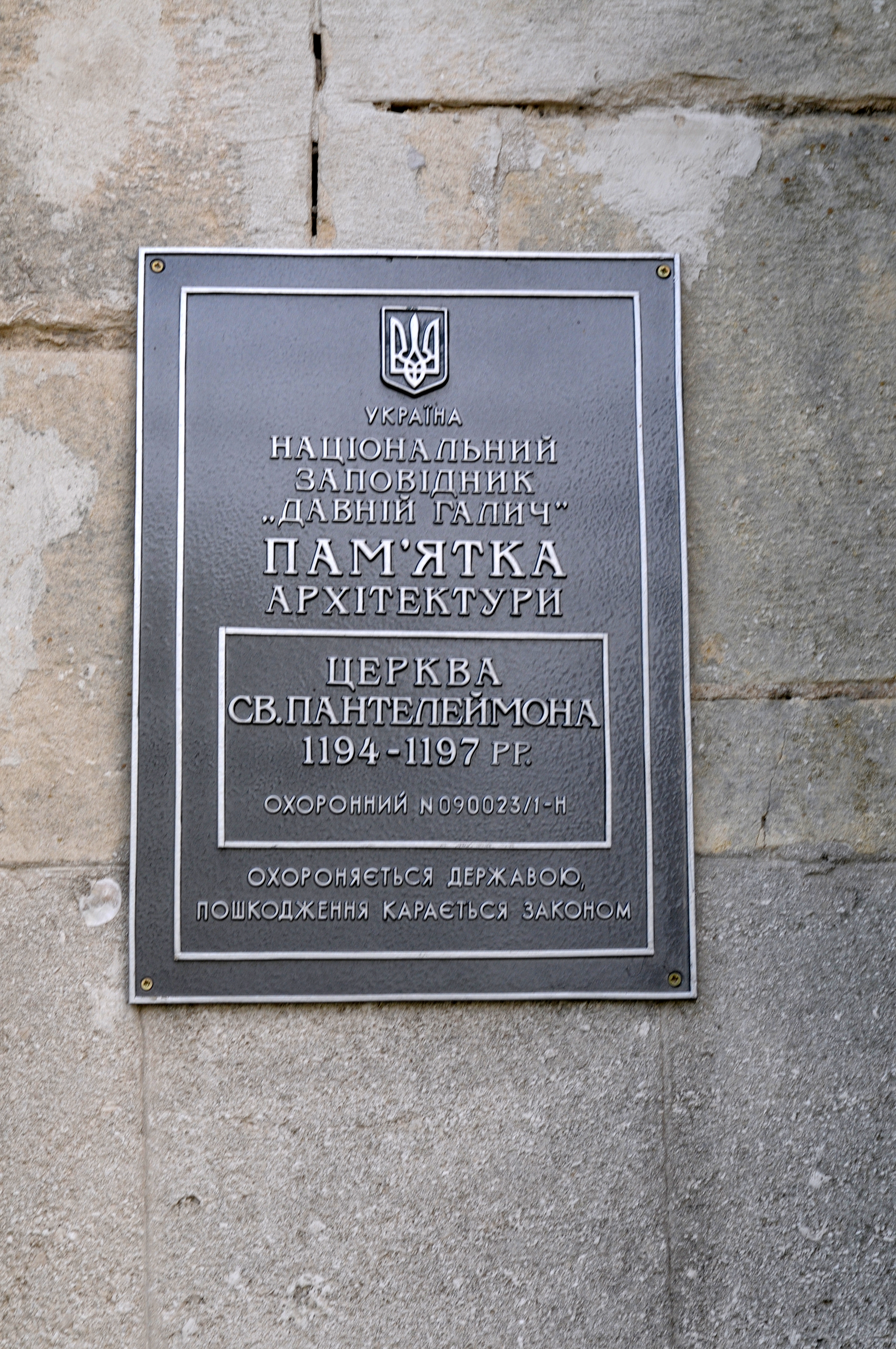
Plaque

=== Bell tower ===
The bell tower is square in plan, two-tiered, with a hipped roof. The bell tower was built simultaneously with the reconstruction of the church by the Franciscans at the beginning of the 17th century. At that time, it was part of the western line of defensive ramparts that surrounded the former monastery. The lower tier served as an entrance gate, the upper one as a defensive tower and bell tower. A drawbridge led to the gate through the moat located in front of the ramparts. The bell tower stands on foundations laid out of hewn blocks, which presumably remained from the time of the reconstruction of the church into a basilica. The walls of the tower are made of brick and a small amount of adobe.

== Sources ==
- Вортман Д. Я.. Пантелеймона церква // Encyclopedia of History of Ukraine / edited: V. A. Smoliy (head) et al.; Institute of History of Ukraine. — Кyiv : Naukova Dumka, 2011. — V. 8 : Па — Прик. — p. 50. — ISBN 978-966-00-1142-7.
- Вол. Дідух. Пантелеймонівський храм — перлина білокам'яного зодчества // Пам'ятки України, 2013. — № 6 за червень. — p. 22-29.
- Корнієнко В.Документи канцелярії галицького князя Мстислава Мстиславовича на стінах церкви Святого Пантелеймона // Галич. Збірник наукових праць. - Вип.2. / За ред. М. Волощука. - Івано-Франківськ: "Лілея-НВ", 2017. - p. 86 - 104.
- Мнацаканян Піруз. Вірменські інскрипції з церкви Святого Пантелеймона в Галичі // Галич. Збірник наукових праць. - Вип.2. / За ред. М. Волощука. - Ivano-Frankivsk: "Лілея-НВ", 2017. - С.80 - 85.
- Могитич І. Результати дослідження церкви Пантелеймона біля Галича // Галич. Збірник наукових праць. - Вип.2. / За ред. М. Волощука. - Ivano-Frankivsk: "Лілея-НВ", 2017. - p. 247 - 271.
- Пеленський Й. Галич в історії середньовічного мистецтва на основі археологічних досліджень і архівних джерел. // Галич. Збірник наукових праць / За ред. М.Волощука. - Ivano-Frankivsk: "Лілея -НВ", 2018. - Series 2. - Issue 4. - 320 pp.
- Петрушевич А. Историческое известіе о церкви св. Пантелеймона близъ города Галича теперь костел св. Станислава оо. Францискановъ яко древнейшемъ памятникьроманскаго зодчества на Галицкой Руси съ первой половины ХІІІ ст. – Lviv, 1881. – 136 pp.
- Слободян В., Гусак А. Образок з життя на зламі ХІІ-ХІІІ ст. зі стін храму Святого Пантелеймона поблизу Галича // Галич. Збірник наукових праць. - Вип.2. / За ред. М. Волощука. - Івано-Франківськ: "Лілея-НВ", 2017. - p.105 - 114.
- ŁuszczkiewiczWładysław. Kościół w św. Stanisławie pod Haliczem jako zabytek romański. // Sprawozdania Komisyi historii sztuki. – Kraków, 1880. – T. II. – Zesz I. – S.12.
- Шевченкове // Україна Інкогніта
- Храм Святого Пантелеймона // Офіційний сайт Національного заповідника «Давній Галич»
