= Gaelic revival (disambiguation) =

The Gaelic revival was the late-nineteenth-century revival of interest in the Irish language and Irish Gaelic culture.

Gaelic revival may also refer to:

- The Gaelic Resurgence, the c. 1350–1500 re-Gaelicisation of parts of Ireland previously under Anglo-Norman influence
- The current revival of the status of the Irish language
- Scottish Gaelic Renaissance, 19th-century
- Scottish Gaelic revitalisation, goal continuing to the present
- The current revival of the Manx language, begun in the 20th century

== See also ==
- Language revitalization
- Celtic Revival, overlapped with the Gaelic revival
- Gaelic (disambiguation)
