= Galizia =

Galizia may refer to:

- Galicia (Eastern Europe), a historical and geographic region sometimes spelled Galizia
- Galizia, the Italian name for Galicia (Spain)
- Galizia (surname), an Italian surname (including a list of people with the name)

== See also ==
- Galicia (disambiguation)
