= Bartošovce =

- Municipality
- Flag Coat of arms

- Location of Bartošovce in the Prešov Region Location of Bartošovce in Slovakia
- Coordinates: 49.20°N 21.28°E
- Country: Slovakia
- Region: Prešov Region
- District: Bardejov District
- First mentioned: 1427

Area
  - Total: 11.23 km^{2} (4.34 sq mi)
- Elevation: 355 m (1,165 ft)

Population (2025)
  - Total: 788
- Time zone: UTC+1 (CET)
  - Summer (DST): UTC+2 (CEST)
- Postal code: 864 2
- Area code: +421 54
- Vehicle registration plate (until 2022): BJ
- Website: www.obecbartosovce.sk

Bartošovce (Rusyn: Бартошовцї, romanized: Bartoshovtsï, Hungarian: Bartosfalva) is a village and municipality in Bardejov District in the Prešov Region of north-east Slovakia.

== History ==
The first written mention of the village dates back to 1408 . Because of the fertile soil and the proximity of Bardejov, landowners settled here, who built a majer with cattle breeding and cultivation of agricultural crops and flour production. There were two mills here - the upper one and the lower one. This is also why the village is still divided into Vyšný mlyn, Nižný mlyn and Podstavinec . Bartošovce have a rich history. They transformed themselves through many names, such as Bartosfaula - up to the present. Shortly after the establishment of the village, a paper mill was established here. In the 17th century, a tile factory was established here together with a brick factory, famous in the wide area of eastern Austria-Hungary. Together with the village of Kurima formed the main centers of the Bardejov district until the 19th century.

Around the year 1600, a Roman Catholic church was built here, which has been preserved here in the same form after many reconstructions (the last one in 2010) and is admired by many tourists. Two streams flow through the village - Sekčov and Vieska.)

For history prior to this time, the Principality of Halych existed in (modern) southern Poland with a western Provincial city of Przemyśl, located just north of mountains near Bartosovce. The history of the Halych Principality Principality of Haluych history ends at the Dmitriy Liubart 1340–1349 when Lithuanian authority begins and Halych authority ends. Slave trade and other local information may be available from a non-western European (non-Hungarian)perspective by further investigation, along this line. See M Laser History on Halych Principality (Slave Trade) circa 13th century.

As a frontier region the valley containing Bartosovce, the Sekcov River valley had some strategic importance to the Hapsburgs and Polish-Lithuanians. The existence and history of the Kapusany castle (https://medievalheritage.eu/en/main-page/heritage/slovakia/kapusany-castle/) tells the story of the conditions and allegiances the people that the people of Bartosovce may have experienced.

== Geography ==
The municipality lies at an altitude of 355 metres (1,165 ft) and covers an area of 11.23 km^{2} (4.34 sq mi) (2025).

== Population ==
Population statistic (10 years)
Year	1995	2005	2015	2025
Count	710	724	713	788
Difference		+1.97%	−1.51%	+10.51%

Population statistic
Year	2024	2025
Count	774	788
Difference		+1.80%

It has a population of 788 people (31 December 2025).

=== Ethnicity ===
Census 2021 (1+ %)
Ethnicity	Number	Fraction
Slovak	727	98.5%
Not found out	12	1.62%
Total	738	

In year 2021 was 738 people by ethnicity 727 as Slovak, 12 as Not found out, 6 as Rusyn, 2 as Czech, 1 as Jewish, 1 as Ukrainian, 1 as Russian, 1 as Romanian and 1 as Other.

Note on population: The difference values of population numbers in the table "Population statistic" and in the sections "Ethnicity" & "Religion" is caused by the use of various statistical methods.

=== Religion ===
Census 2021 (1+ %)
Religion	Number	Fraction
Roman Catholic Church	697	94.44%
Greek Catholic Church	14	1.9%
None	11	1.49%
Total	738	

In year 2021 was 738 people by religion 697 from Roman Catholic Church, 14 from Greek Catholic Church, 11 from None, 7 from Not found out, 3 from Evangelical Church, 2 from Jehovah's Witnesses, 2 from Christian Congregations in Slovakia, 1 from Eastern Orthodox Church and 1 from Hinduism.

== Present ==
The village has a public library, a gym, and a football pitch.

Currently, the village is industrial and agricultural. There is also an agricultural cooperative focused on cattle breeding. In the center of Bartošovice there is a newly reconstructed cultural center and a local shop and restaurant. The women's choir, the Plamienok children's choir take care of cultural activities, and in 2010, the Bartošovské dzivčata i paropci youth folklore ensemble was founded here . There is also a football field in the village, where the football club TJ Čergov Bartošovce plays matches.

== See also ==
- List of municipalities and towns in Slovakia
