= Gaelic =

Gaelic (pronounced /ˈɡeɪ.lɪk/ for Irish Gaelic and /ˈɡæ.lɪk/ for Scots Gaelic) is an adjective that means "pertaining to the Gaels". It may refer to:

== Languages ==
- Gaelic languages or Goidelic languages, a linguistic group that is one of the two branches of the Insular Celtic languages, including:
  - Primitive Gaelic or Archaic Gaelic, the oldest known form of the Gaelic languages
  - Old Gaelic or Old Irish, used c. AD 600–900
  - Middle Gaelic or Middle Irish, used c. AD 900–1200
  - Classical Gaelic
  - Irish Gaelic (Gaeilge), including Classical Gaelic and Early Modern Gaelic, c. 1200-1600)
    - Gaelic type, a typeface used in Ireland
  - Scots Gaelic (Gàidhlig), a derivative of Irish Gaelic, historically sometimes called Erse in Scots and Scots English
    - Canadian Gaelic (Gàidhlig Chanada or A' Ghàidhlig Chanadach), a dialect of Scots Gaelic spoken in the Canadian Maritime region
  - Manx Gaelic (Gaelg or Gailck), Gaelic language with Norse elements

== Culture and history ==
- Gaelic Ireland, the history of the Gaels of Ireland
- Gaelic literature
- Gaelic revival, a movement in the late 20th century to encourage both the use of Irish Gaelic in Ireland and the revival of older Irish cultural practices
- Gaelic-Norse, a people of combined Gaelic-Scandinavian culture influential in the Middle Ages
- Traditional Gaelic music, the music of the Gaels

== Sports ==
- Gaelic games, traditional sports played in Ireland, notably Gaelic football, Gaelic handball, Hurling/Camogie, and Rounders
  - Gaelic football, an Irish variety of football
  - Gaelic handball, an Irish variety of handball
- Gaelic Athletic Association, the governing body of Gaelic games such as hurling and men's Gaelic football

== Other uses ==
- A Gaelic Blessing, a 1978 choral composition by John Rutter
- Gaelic Symphony, an 1896 symphony composed by Amy Beach
- SS Gaelic, two ships of the White Star Line
- SS Empire Gaelic, a ferry in service 1949-60

== See also ==
- Galic (surname)
- Category:Gaelic languages
- Gallic (disambiguation)
