= Galician =

Galician may refer to:

- Something of, from, or related to Galicia (Spain)
  - Galician language
  - Galician people
  - Gallaeci, a large Celtic tribal federation who inhabited Gallaecia (currently Galicia (Spain)
- Something of, from, or related to Galicia (Eastern Europe)
- SS Galician a liner later renamed HMHS Glenart Castle

== See also ==
- Galicia (disambiguation)
- Halychian (disambiguation)
