= Galatia (disambiguation) =

Galatia may refer to:

- Galatia, an ancient region of Asia Minor
- Galatia (Roman province), a province of the Roman empire
- Galatia, Cyprus
- Galatia, Illinois, United States
- Galatia, Kansas, United States
- Galatia, Kozani, Greece
- Galatia, Turkey

== See also ==
- Galatea (disambiguation)
- Galicia (disambiguation)
- Galatasaray (disambiguation)
- Galata, neighbourhood in the Beyoğlu district of Istanbul, Turkey
