= Galić =

Galić (Serbian Cyrillic: Галић, pronounced [ɡǎːlitɕ]) is a South Slavic surname. It may refer to:

- Anita Galić (born 1985), freestyle swimmer from Croatia
- Cvitan Galić (1909–1944), Croatian World War II fighter ace
- Milan Galić (1938–2014), former Serbian footballer
- Stanislav Galić (born 1943), Serb military officer
- Valerija Galić (born 1956), vice-president of the Constitutional Court of Bosnia and Herzegovina
- Melina Galić, Bosniak fashion designer based in Belgrade.

== See also ==
- Galič, a Slovene surname
- Galich (surname)
- Gaelic (disambiguation)
