= RMS Gaelic =

Two ships of the White Star Line have borne the name Gaelic, an adjective that means "pertaining to the Gaels":

- SS Gaelic (1873) was a livestock carrier launched in 1873. She was chartered to the Occidental & Oriental Steamship Company between 1875 and 1883 and was sold in 1883 to Cia de Nav.La Flecha and renamed Hugo.
- RMS Gaelic (1885) was a passenger liner launched in 1885. She was sold to the Pacific Steam Navigation Company in 1905 and renamed Callao.
