= Galich (surname) =

Galich is a surname. It may refer to:

- Alexander Galich (philosopher) (1783–1848), Russian teacher, philosopher, and writer
- Alexander Galich (writer) (1918–1977), Soviet Russian poet, screenwriter, playwright, singer-songwriter, and dissident
- Ida Galich (born 1990), Russian blogger and singer
- Franz Galich (1951-2007), Guatemalan writer and professor
- Manuel Galich (1913-1984), Guatemalan playwright

== See also ==
- Galič (surname), a Slovene surname
- Galić, a South Slavic surname
