= Galizia (surname) =

Galizia is an Italian surname which is most prevalent in the southeastern region of Apulia and is also to be found among the American, Brazilian and Argentinian Italian diaspora. Notable people with the surname include:

- Daphne Caruana Galizia (1964–2017), Maltese journalist, writer and critic
- Emanuele Luigi Galizia (1830–1907), Maltese architect and civil engineer
- Fede Galizia (c. 1574 – c. 1630), Italian Renaissance painter
- Joseph Galizia (1941–1998), American mobster of Italian descent
