= Oleg Yaroslavich =

Prince of Galicia
- Reign: 1187 (?) 1189
- Predecessor: Yaroslav Osmomysl; Vladimir II Yaroslavich
- Successor: Vladimir II Yaroslavich; Roman Mstislavich
- Born: after 1161
- Died: 1189
- House: Rostislavichi of Tmutarakan
- Father: Yaroslav Osmomysl
- Mother: Nastaska (his father's mistress)

Oleg Yaroslavich "Nastasich" (after 1161 – 1189) was Prince of Galicia (1187; 1189).

== Life ==
Oleg was the illegitimate son of Prince Yaroslav Osmomysl by his mistress, Nastaska, a daughter of a local boyar. The Galician boyars had his mother burned as a witch, forced his father to reinstate his wife (whom Yaroslav had left in order to take Oleg’s mother), and imprisoned Oleg.

Yaroslav died on 1 October 1187, giving Peremyshl (Przemyśl) to his only legitimate son, Vladimir Yaroslavich.

== Ancestry ==
Ancestors of Oleg Yaroslavich

16.Rostislav Vladimirovich, prince of Peremyshl
8.Volodar Rostislavich, prince of Peremyshl
4. Volodimerko Volodarevich, prince of Halych
9. Anna (?) of Pommern
2. Yaroslav Volodimerovich, prince of Halych
1. Oleg Yaroslavich
3. Nastaska (mistress)

== Sources ==
- Dimnik, Martin: The Dynasty of Chernigov – 1146–1246; Cambridge University Press, 2003, Cambridge; ISBN 978-0-521-03981-9.

Oleg Yaroslavich Rostislavichi of Tmutarakan Born: after 1161 Died: 1189
Regnal titles
Preceded by Yaroslav Volodimerovich	Prince of Halych; 1187	Succeeded by Vladimir II Yaroslavich
Preceded by Vladimir II Yaroslavich	(?) Prince of Halych; 1189	Succeeded by Roman Mstislavich
