= Galateia, Kozani =

Galateia Γαλάτεια
- Community
- Location within Greece
- Coordinates: 40°33.45′N 21°35.8′E
- Country: Greece
- Administrative region: West Macedonia
- Regional unit: Kozani
- Municipality: Eordaia
- Municipal unit: Ptolemaida
- Elevation: 650 m (2,130 ft)

Population (2021)
  - Community: 400
- Time zone: UTC+2 (EET)
  - Summer (DST): UTC+3 (EEST)
- Postal code: 502 00
- Area code: +30-2463
- Vehicle registration: ΚΖ

Galateia (Greek: Γαλάτεια), known before 1926 as Chor (Greek: Τσορ), is a village and a community of the Eordaia municipality. Before the 2011 local government reform it was part of the municipality of Ptolemaida, of which it was a municipal district. The 2021 census recorded 400 inhabitants in the village.
