= Roman the Great =

Prince of Galicia and Volhynia (1152–1205)

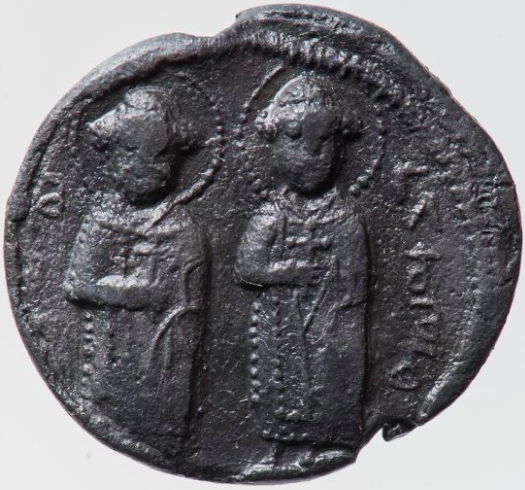
- Seal used by Roman during his rule in Novgorod

Prince of Novgorod
- Reign: 1168–1170
- Predecessor: Svyatoslav IV Rostislavich
- Successor: Rurik Rostislavich

Prince of Volhynia
- Reign: 1170–1189; 1189–1205
- Predecessor: Mstislav III Izyaslavich; Vsevolod II Mstislavich
- Successor: Vsevolod II Mstislavich; Daniel Romanovich

Prince of Galicia
- Reign: 1189; 1198/1199–1205
- Predecessor: (?) Oleg Yaroslavich; Vladimir II Yaroslavich
- Successor: Andrew II; Daniel Romanovich
- Born: c. 4 April 1152
- Died: 19 June 1205 (52-53); Near Zawichost, Kingdom of Poland
- Spouse: Predslava Rurikovna; Anna-Euphrosyne
- Issue: Fedora Romanovna; Olena Romanovna; Daniel Romanovich; Vasylko Romanovich
- House: Rurik
- Father: Mstislav II of Kiev
- Mother: Agnes of Poland
- Religion: Eastern Orthodox Christianity

Roman Mstislavich (Note: Old East Slavic: Романъ Мьстиславьличь; Russian and Ukrainian: Роман Мстиславич) (c. 4 April 1152 – 19 June 1205), also known as Roman the Great, was Prince of Novgorod (1168–1170), Volhynia (1170–1189; 1189–1205), and Galicia (1189; 1198/99–1205). He founded the Romanovichi branch of Rurikids, which would rule Galicia–Volhynia until 1340.

By seizing the throne of Galicia, he dominated the western regions of Kievan Rus'. In the early 13th century, Byzantine chroniclers applied the imperial title of autocrate (αύτοκράτωρ) to him, but there is no evidence that he assumed it officially.

He waged two successful campaigns against the Cumans, from which he returned with many rescued captives. The effect of Roman's victory was, however, undermined by new divisions among the princes of Rus'.

Roman was killed during the Battle of Zawichost, where his forces were crushed by the Polish forces led by Leszek the White, Duke of Sandomierz, and his brother Konrad I of Masovia.

== Early life ==
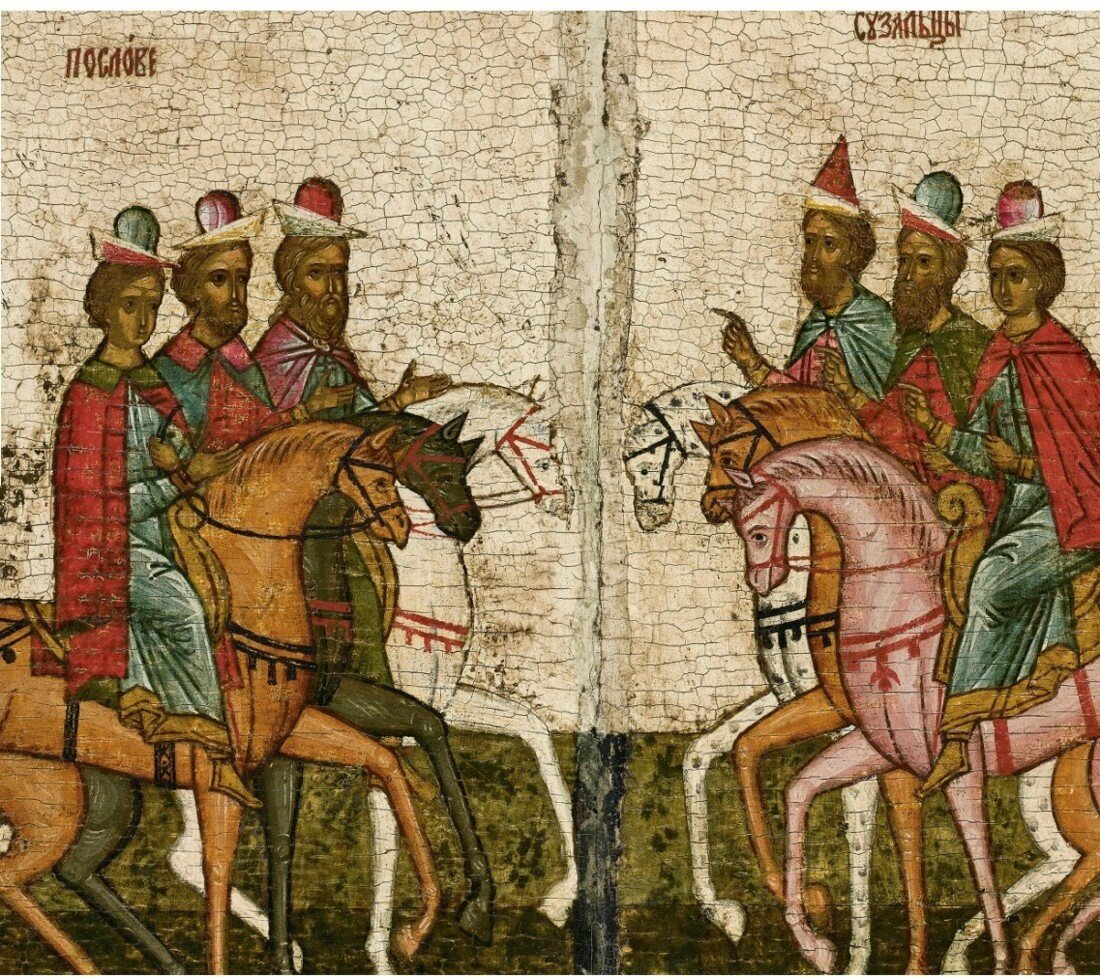
Roman (left) negotiating with Bogolyubsky's son Mstislav during the siege of Novgorod in 1170

Roman was the son of Mstislav Iziaslavich, Grand Prince of Kiev, and Agnes of Poland. His maternal grandfather was Polish prince Boleslaw the Wrymouth. Invited by the locals to rule Novgorod in 1168, the young prince was opposed by Andrey Bogolyubsky, the powerful ruler of Vladimir and Suzdal. In 1170 Roman defeated Bogolyubsky's son Mstislav in a battle, however after the death of his father in the same year he was expelled from Novgorod and moved to Volhynia, where he inherited the city of Volodymyr. In 1188 Roman married Predslava, the daughter of the future Kyivan prince Rurik Rostislavich. In the same year, after the death of Galician prince Yaroslav Osmomysl, Roman captured Halych, but was soon expelled by Hungarian king Bela III. During his campaign in Halych, Roman's seat in Volodymyr was taken by his brother Vsevolod Mstislavich of Volhynia, and after his return the prince allied with his father-in-law Rurik to return his Volhynian holdings.

== Rise to power ==
After Rurik Rostislavich inherited the throne of Kyiv in 1194, he granted Roman control over several towns in Kyiv Principality, including Torchesk. However, under the pressure of Vladimir prince Vsevolod the Big Nest Rurik eventually revoked his decision, which led Roman into the alliance with Yaroslav II Vsevolodovich, Prince of Chernigov, as well as his cousins — dukes Leszek the White and Konrad of Masovia. As a result, Roman was entangled into the conflict between Polish princes against their enemy Mieszko the Old, but was wounded in a battle and returned to Rus'. After a short period of reconciliation, during which Rurik granted him the town of Polonne, in 1196 Roman continued the fight against his father-in-law, allying with the Olgovichi clan. In the same year the prince also raided raid against Jotvingians, who were attacking the borders of his principality. During this time he divorced his wife and married a woman named Anna, whose exact ancestry is unclear, but it is theorized that she could be the daughter of Byzantine Emperor Isaac II Angelos.

== Rule over Galicia-Volhynia ==
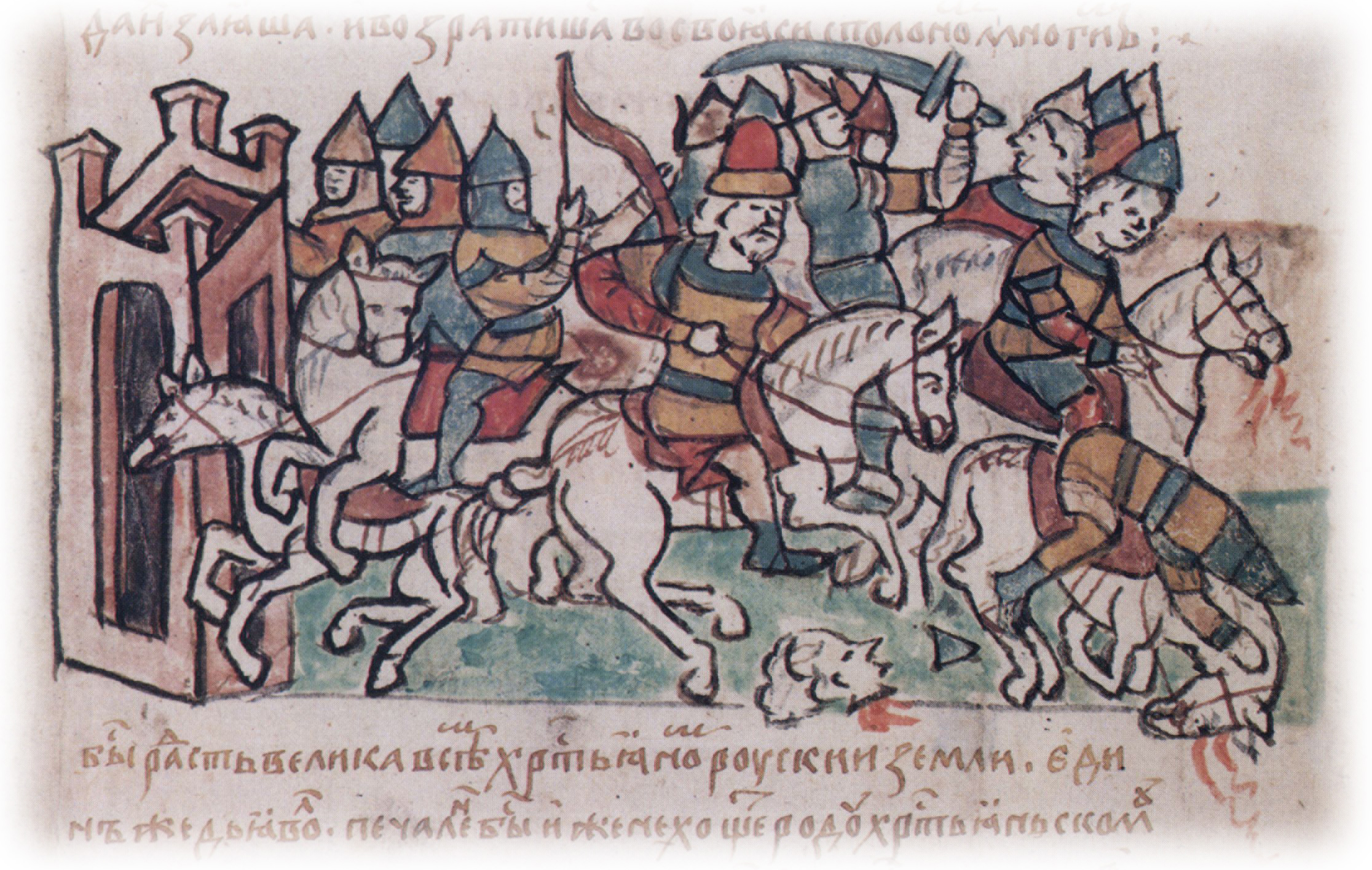
Roman and Rurik fighting against the Cumans – illustration from the Radziwiłł Chronicle

In 1199, after the death of Prince Volodymyr Yaroslavych of Halych, Roman captured the Galician throne for the second time, creating the Principality of Galicia-Volhynia. During his rule over Halych he suppressed local boyar clans and enjoyed support of the townspeople. In 1201–1202 and 1203–1204 Roman led two successful campaigns against the Cumans, who were allied with Rurik during that time, and captured Kyiv, installing his brother-in-law Rostislav Rurikovich as its prince. Roman also established ties with the Byzantine Empire: according to Polish chronicler Jan Długosz, after the Fall of Constantinople to the Crusaders in 1204, he gave refuge to deposed emperor Constantine Laskaris in Galicia.

== Death and succession ==
In 1205 Roman, for unknown reason, suddenly broke the alliance with Leszek and Konrad and invaded Poland. According to the Galician-Volhynian Chronicle, this decision was advised to him by the influential Galician boyar Volodyslav Kormylchych, who would later proclaim himself Prince of Galicia. Another possibility is that Roman was involved in internal conflicts between Polish and, possibly, even German rulers. In the Battle of Zawichost, Roman's force was suddenly attacked by Polish knights, and the prince was killed. His temporary burial place was located in Sandomierz. After Roman's death his young sons Daniel and Vasylko were expelled from Halych by the boyars and fled to Volodymyr together with their mother. The Galician throne was transferred to Vladimir III Igorevich, Prince of Novgorod-Seversky. (Note: For more information see War of the Galician Succession (1205–1245))

== Legacy ==
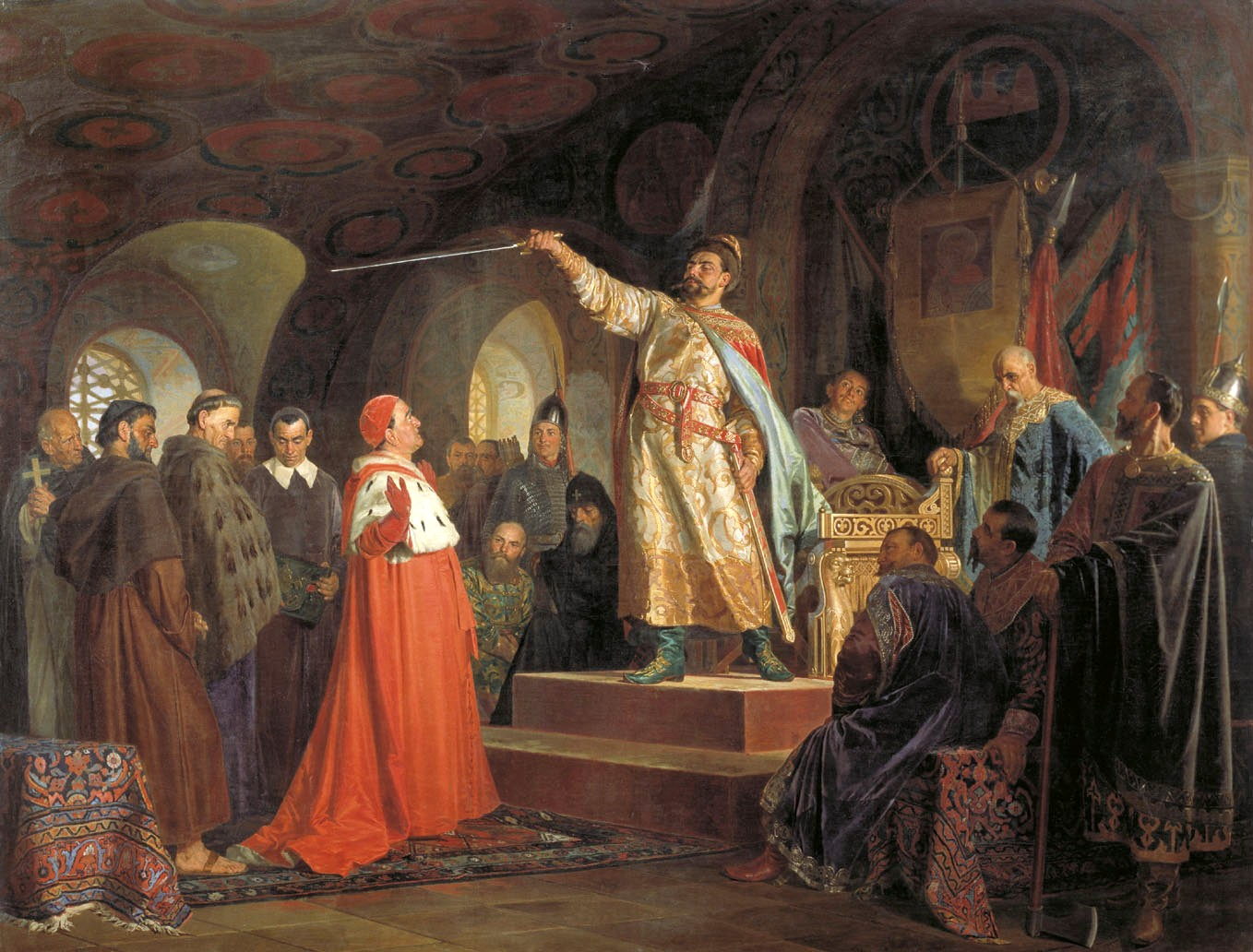
Roman receiving the Pope's ambassadors, a 19th century painting by Nikolai Nevrev

Galician-Volhynian chronists had a favourable view of Roman Mstyslavych, praising him as a wise ruler and a brave fighter against infidels. However, Polish historian Jan Długosz saw Roman as a tyrant who was installed with Leszek's help and terrorized his subjects. According to some sources, in 1204 Roman was offered a royal crown by Pope Innocent III, but either refused to bow to Rome, or died before the coronation could take place. His untimely death led to the War of the Galician Succession (1205-1245).

According to Vasily Tatishchev, Roman supposedly envisioned a project of reforming the government model of Rus' by establishing primogeniture in the six biggest principalities - Galicia-Volhynia, Vladimir-Suzdal, Polotsk, Chernigov, Smolensk and Ryazan - with the rulers of those principalities electing the Prince of Kyiv in a manner similar to prince-electors of the Holy Roman Empire. However, no original document proving the existence of such proposal has been preserved.

== See also ==
- List of people known as the Great

== Sources ==
- Dimnik, Martin: The Dynasty of Chernigov - 1146-1246; Cambridge University Press, 2003, Cambridge; ISBN 978-0-521-03981-9.
- Długosz, Jan (1480). Annales seu cronicae incliti Regni Poloniae (Annals or Chronicles of the Famous Kingdom of Poland). ISBN 1-901019-00-4.
- Raffensperger, Christian; Ostrowski, Donald (2023). "Chapter 6: Roman Mstislavich and His Family". The Ruling Families of Rus: Clan, Family and Kingdom. London: Reaktion Books. p. 309. ISBN 978-1-78914-745-2. (e-book)
- Subtelny, Orest: Ukraine: A History; University of Toronto Press, 2000, Toronto, Buffalo & London; ISBN 0-8020-8390-0
- Vernadsky, George: Kievan Russia; Yale University Press, 1948, New Haven and London; ISBN 0-300-01647-6.

Roman the Great Rurik Born: c. 1152 Died: 14 October 1205
Regnal titles
| Preceded by Svyatoslav IV Rostislavich | Prince of Novgorod; 1168–1170 | Succeeded by Ryurik Rostislavich |
| Preceded by Mstislav III Izyaslavich | Prince of Vladimir-in-Volhynia; 1170–1189 | Succeeded by Vsevolod II Mstislavich |
| Preceded by (?) Oleg Yaroslavich | Prince of Galicia; 1189 | Succeeded by Andrew I |
| Preceded by Vsevolod II Mstislavich | Prince of Vladimir-in-Volhynia; 1189–1205 | Succeeded by Daniel Romanovich |
| Preceded by Vladimir II Yaroslavich | Prince of Galicia; 1198/99–1205 | Succeeded by Daniel Romanovich |
