= Galicia =

Galicia may refer to:

== Geographic regions ==
- Galicia (Spain), a region and autonomous community of northwestern Spain
  - Gallaeci, pre-Roman Celtic tribal complex who inhabited the north-western corner of Iberia
  - Gallaecia, a Roman province
  - The post-Roman Kingdom of the Suebi, also called the Kingdom of Gallaecia or Suebi Kingdom of Galicia
  - The medieval Kingdom of Galicia
  - The Republic of Galicia, which only lasted for a few hours on 27 June 1931
- Galicia (Eastern Europe), a historical region in southeastern Poland and western Ukraine
  - The Principality of Galicia
  - The Kingdom of Galicia–Volhynia or Kingdom of Rus', a medieval kingdom
  - The Kingdom of Galicia and Lodomeria, a crown land of the Austrian Empire and later the Austrian half (Cisleithania) of Austria-Hungary
  - West Galicia or New Galicia, a short-lived administrative region of the Austrian Empire, eventually merged into the Kingdom of Galicia and Lodomeria
  - The District of Galicia, part of the Nazi General Government during the World War II occupation of Poland

=== Named after Spanish Galicia ===
- Galicia, Aklan, a barangay in Panay, Philippines
- Gallizien, a town in Carinthia, Austria
- Nueva Galicia, a region of New Spain that joined Mexico
- Nueva Galicia, an old name applied to the Chiloé Archipelago in southern Chile

== Ships ==
- Spanish ship Galicia (1750), Spanish third-rate ship of the line
- Galicia-class landing platform dock, a ship class of the Spanish Navy
  - Spanish ship Galicia (L51), lead ship of the Galicia-class
- Spanish landing ship Galicia (L31), formerly USS San Marcos, bought in 1974 by the Spanish Navy

== Sports ==
- Deportivo Galicia, a Venezuelan football club
- FC Deportivo Galicia, an English football club
- Galícia Esporte Clube, a Brazilian football club
- Brookhattan–Galicia, called Galicia 1958–1961, New York City soccer club
- Galicia national football team, the official football team of Galicia
- Galicia national football team (Eastern Europe), a Polish team

== Other uses ==
- Galician Massif, a mountainous section of Galicia
- Galicia (crustacean), a fossil in family Erymidae
- Grupo Financiero Galicia, an Argentinean financial services company
- Galicia Division, a division of the Waffen-SS composed of Ukrainian volunteers

== See also ==
- Galatia (disambiguation)
- Galich (disambiguation)
- Galician (disambiguation)
- Galizia (disambiguation)
- Galle, Sri Lanka
- Halych
