= Vladimir II Yaroslavich =

Prince of Galicia (died 1198/99)

Prince of Galicia
- Reign: 1187–1189; 1189–1198/99
- Predecessor: Oleg Yaroslavich; Andrew I
- Successor: (?) Oleg Yaroslavich; Roman the Great
- Died: 1198/99
- Spouse: Boleslava Svyatoslavna; Unknown
- Issue: Vasilko Vladimirovich; Vladimir Vladimirovich
- House: Rurik
- Father: Yaroslav Osmomysl
- Mother: Olga Yuryevna

Vladimir II Yaroslavich (Ukrainian: Володимир Ярославич, Volodymyr Yaroslavych; died 1198/1199) was Prince of Galicia (1187–1189, 1189–1198/99). He was from the Rurikid dynasty.

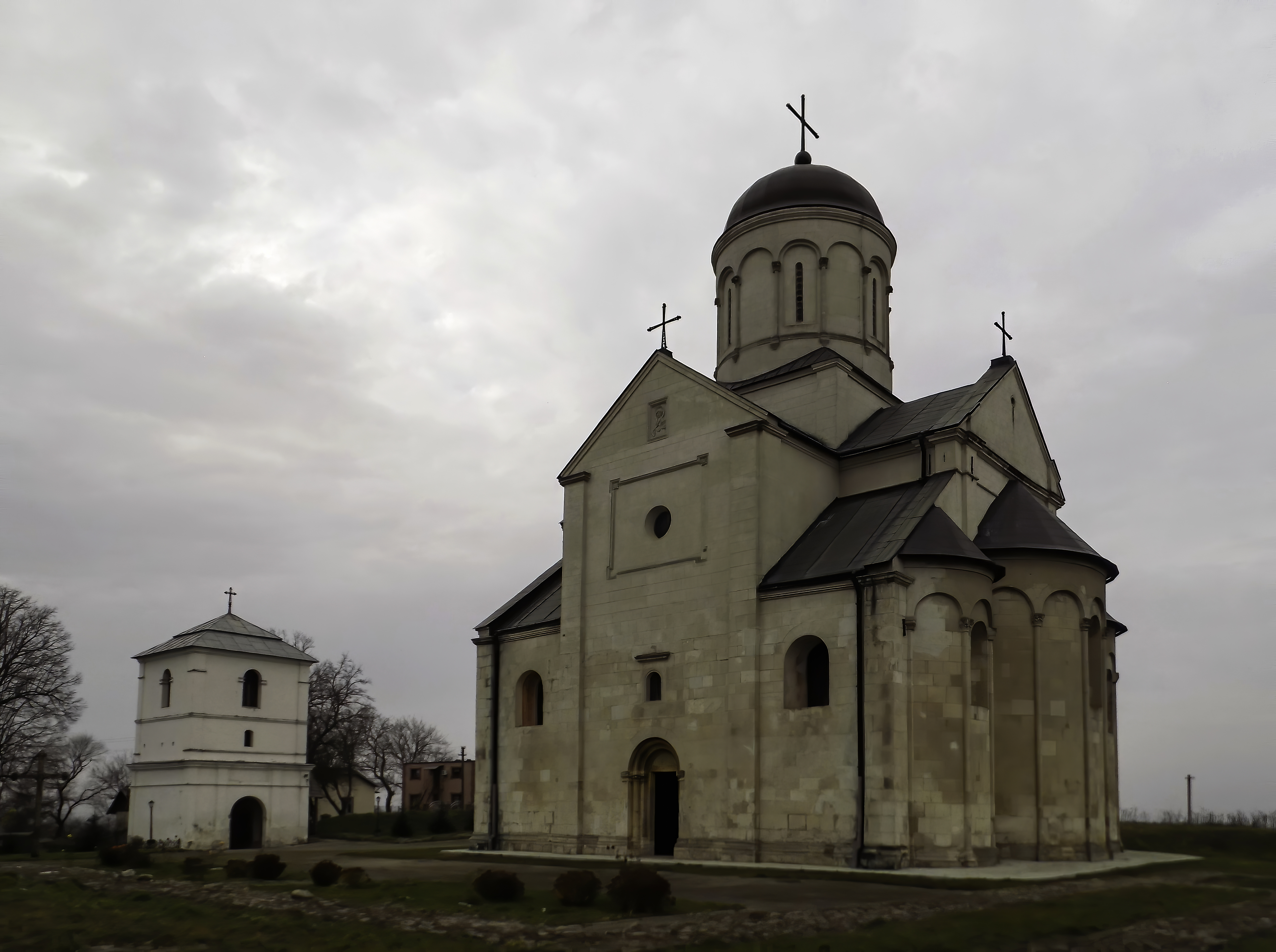
Saint Pantaleon's Church near Halych built under the reign of Vladimir II Yaroslavich

Described as profligate by nature, he lived a debauched life and was politically ineffectual. Due to the strife between Vladimir and his stepbrother, Oleg Yaroslavich and to the interference of Prince Roman the Great and King Béla III of Hungary, his reign in Galicia was characterized by troubles. Following Oleg's expulsion by Galician boyars, a civil war started in the principality with the involvement of Hungary, Poland and neighbouring Rus' principalities. In 1189, with the help of Frederick Barbarossa and the Polish king, Vladimir managed to take Halych. The protection that his uncle, Prince Vsevolod III Yuryevich of Vladimir ensured political stability in Galicia.

Vladimir was the last male descendant of the first dynasty ruling in Galicia; and therefore his death created a political vacuum. Following his death in 1199 Galicia was captured by Roman Mstislavich of Volhynia, uniting both principalities.

== Ancestors ==
Ancestors of Vladimir II Yaroslavich

16.Rostislav Vladimirovich, prince of Peremyshl
8.Volodar Rostislavich, prince of Peremyshl
4. Volodimerko Volodarevich, prince of Halych
9. Anna (?) of Pommern
2. Yaroslav Volodimerovich, prince of Halych
1. Vladimir II Yaroslavich
24. Vsevolod I Yaroslavich, grand prince of Kiev
12. Vladimir II Vsevolodovich, grand prince of Kiev
25. Maria (Irina)
6. Yuri I Vladimirovich Dolgoruki, prince of Vladimir
3. Olga Yuryevna of Vladimir
28. Ocen, khan of the Cumans
14. Aepo, khan of the Cumans
7. Unknown

== Sources ==
- Dimnik, Martin: The Dynasty of Chernigov - 1146-1246; Cambridge University Press, 2003, Cambridge; ISBN 978-0-521-03981-9.
- Vernadsky, George: Kievan Russia; Yale University Press, 1948, New Haven and London; ISBN 0-300-01647-6.

Vladimir II Yaroslavich Rostislavichi of Tmutarakan Born: ? Died: 1198/99
Regnal titles
Preceded by Oleg Yaroslavich	Prince of Halych; 1187–1189	Succeeded by (?) Oleg Yaroslavich
Preceded by Andrew I	Prince of Halych; 1189–1198/99	Succeeded by Roman Mstislavich
