= Halych, Ternopil Oblast =

Rural locality in Ternopil Oblast, Ukraine

Halych Галич
- Location in Ternopil Oblast
- Coordinates: 49°15′29″N 25°8′20″E
- Country: Ukraine
- Oblast: Ternopil Oblast
- Raion: Ternopil Raion
- Hromada: Pidhaitsi urban hromada
- Time zone: UTC+2 (EET)
  - Summer (DST): UTC+3 (EEST)
- Postal code: 48005

Halych (Ukrainian: Галич) is a village in Pidhaitsi urban hromada, Ternopil Raion, Ternopil Oblast, Ukraine.

== History ==
The first written mention of the village was in 1445.

After the liquidation of the Pidhaitsi Raion on 19 July 2020, the village became part of the Ternopil Raion.

== Religion ==
- Church of the Transfiguration (1772, wooden; reconstructed).

== Sources ==
- (in Ukrainian) Рудий П., Уніят В., Галич // Ternopil Encyclopedic Dictionary: in 4 v. / editorial board: H. Yavorskyi and other, Ternopil: "Zbruch", 2004, V. 1: А—Й, S. 331. — ISBN 966-528-197-6.
- "Halicz, wś". Geographical Dictionary of the Kingdom of Poland (in Polish). 3. Warszawa: Kasa im. Józefa Mianowskiego. 1882. p. 19.
