= Yaroslav Osmomysl =

Prince of Halych (d. 1187)

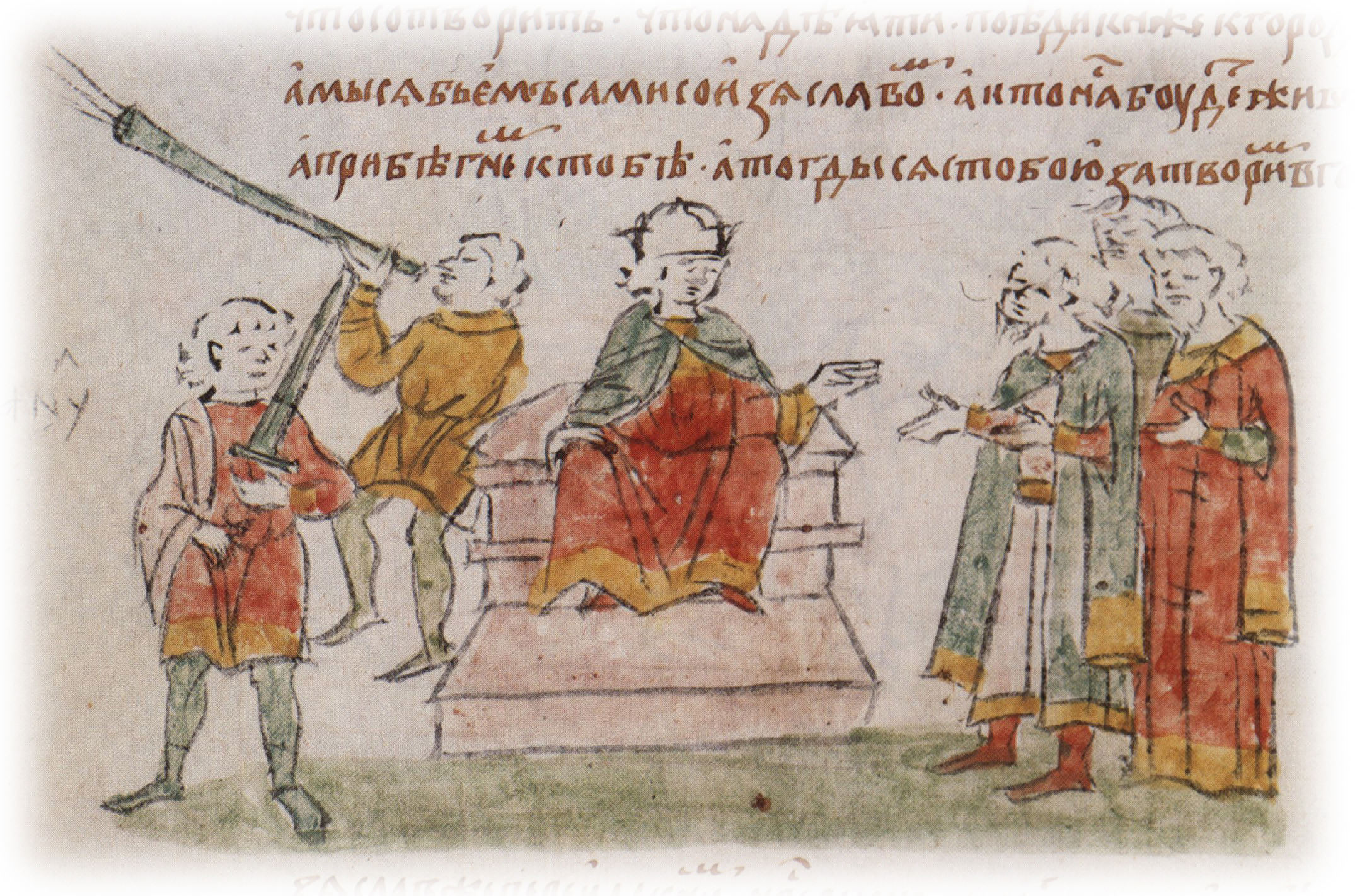
- Yaroslav Osmomysl on the throne, miniature from the Radziwiłł Chronicle (15th century)

Prince of Halych
- Reign: 1153 – 1 October 1187
- Predecessor: Volodymyrko Volodarovych
- Successor: Oleg Yaroslavych
- Born: c. 1135
- Died: 1 October 1187
- Spouse: Olga Yurievna
- Issue: Volodymyr Yaroslavych; Euphrosyne Yaroslavna
- Dynasty: Rostislavichi
- Father: Volodymyrko Volodarovych
- Mother: Sophia of Hungary

Yaroslav Osmomysl (Old East Slavic: Осмомыслъ Ярославъ, Osmomyslŭ Jaroslavŭ; Ukrainian: Ярослав Володимирович Осмомисл, Yaroslav Volodymyrovych Osmomysl) (c. 1135 – 1 October 1187) was a knyaz of Halych (now in western Ukraine). He is best-known for appearing in The Tale of Igor's Campaign, where he was given the sobriquet, Osmomysl meaning "Eight-Minded" in Old East Slavic.

== Biography ==
Son of Volodymyrko of Halych by his wife, a daughter of King Coloman of Hungary, he assumed the throne in 1153. His foreign policy tended towards the alliance with the kings of Hungary and Poland, and against the Grand Princes of Kiev, who supported Yaroslav's cousin Ivan Berladnic in his attempts to take possession of several towns bordering Volynia. After many years of warfare, Yaroslav managed to ensure Berladnic's expulsion to Byzantium.

In 1164–1165, Andronikos the cousin of Manuel I Komnenos, the Byzantine emperor, escaped from captivity in Byzantium and fled to the court of Yaroslav. This situation, holding out the alarming prospect of Andronikos making a bid for Manuel's throne sponsored by both Galicia (Halych) and Hungary, spurred the Byzantines into an unprecedented flurry of diplomacy. Manuel pardoned Andronikos and persuaded him to return to Constantinople in 1165. Yaroslav of Galicia was persuaded to renounce his Hungarian connections and return fully into the imperial fold. As late as 1200, the princes of Galicia were providing invaluable services against the enemies of the Byzantine Empire, at that time the Cumans.

The latter part of his reign was beset by family troubles. He fell in love with one Halychian woman, named Anastasia (also called Nastasia), took her as a concubine, repudiating his lawful wife Olga, the daughter of Yury Dolgoruky, in 1172. The powerful Halychian boyars, who were reluctant to accept Anastasia as their queen, instigated a popular uprising, which resulted in Anastasia's being burnt at the stake. Yaroslav was constrained to deliver the oath to live with Olga in peace but in next year had her expelled to her native Suzdal with a son, Vladimirko. He bequeathed his throne to a natural son by Anastasia (Oleg, sardonically called Nastasyich by the populace), while the lawful heir Vladimirko had to content himself with Przemyśl for the beginning. Very soon, the illegitimate brother Oleg was killed and Vladimirko rose to the entire principality of Halych.

== The Tale of Igor's Campaign ==
Yaroslav's daughter Eufrosinia and her husband Igor Svyatoslavich are central figures of The Tale of Igor's Campaign. Yaroslav is mentioned in the text as a powerful and respected potentate:

Eight-minded Yaroslav of Halych! You sit high on your gold-forged throne; you have braced the Hungarian mountains with your iron troops; you have barred the [Hungarian] king's path; you have closed the Danube's gates, hurling weighty missiles over the clouds, spreading your courts to the Danube. Your thunders range over lands; you open Kiev's gates; from the paternal golden throne you shoot at sultans beyond the lands.

== Reburial ==
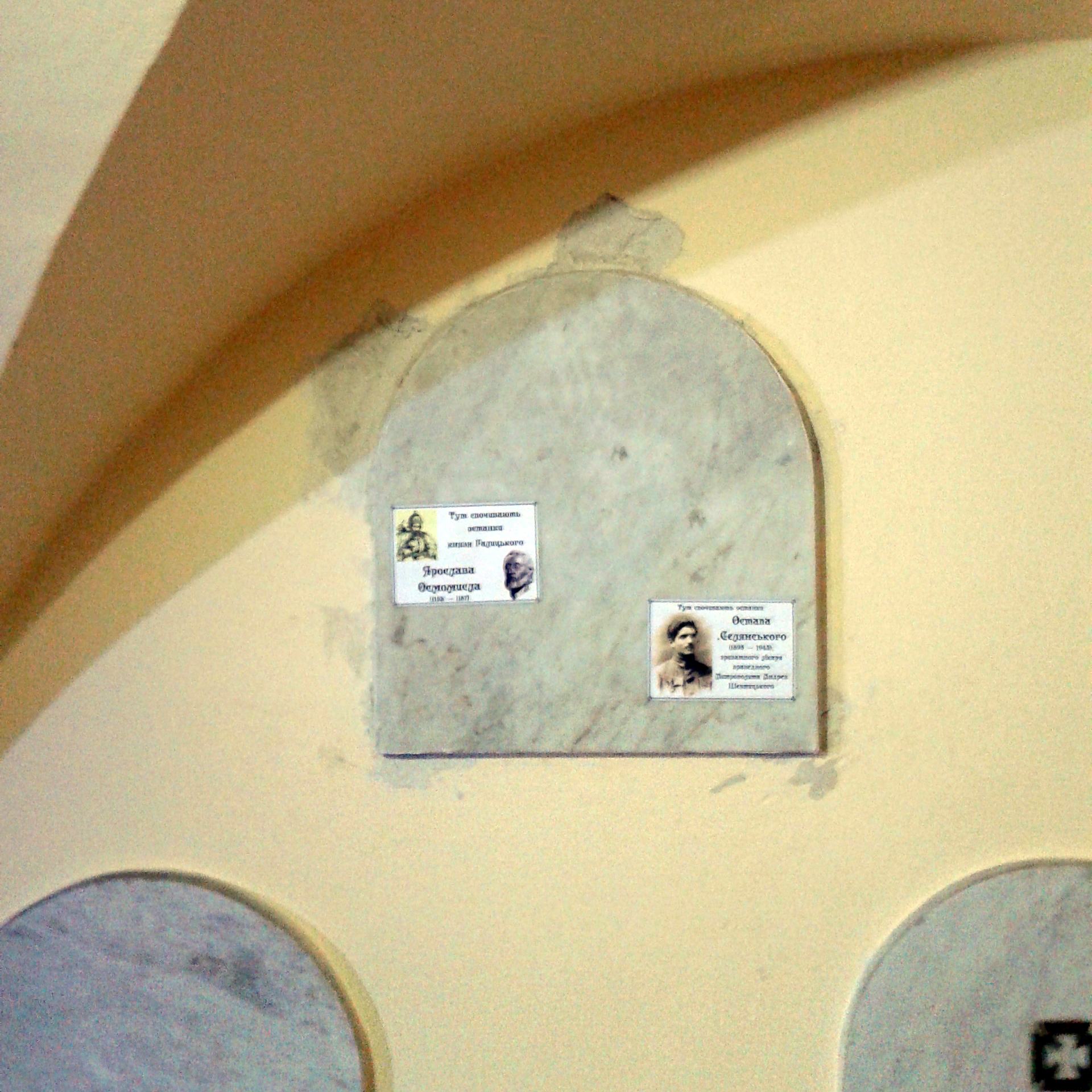
Osmomysl's grave in 2017

Osmomysl's remains found their final resting place only recently after long period of disturbance. Originally, he was buried in the Assumption Cathedral in ancient Halych (now the village of Krylos, in Ivano-Frankivsk Oblast, Ukraine). In 1939 his stone sarcophagus was discovered by Ukrainian archaeologist Jaroslaw Pasternak, after his long search for the cathedral that was destroyed by Mongol-Tatar hordes and never rebuilt later. It appeared that the burial was looted earlier and Yaroslav's bones were found mixed with bones of a young princess of unknown family. The sarcophagus is displayed in the History museum of Ivano-Frankivsk.

Trying to secure his archaeological artifacts from ancient Halych and drawings of the cathedral in Krylos before the Soviet occupation of Western Ukraine, Jaroslaw Pasternak hid them in an undisclosed location shortly after he emigrated to Germany, where he died without disclosing the secret place. The purported remains were found for the second time in 1992, hidden in the crypt of St. George Cathedral in Lviv, by archeologist Yuriy Lukomskyy. After anthropological study, the remains were reburied at the Lviv Cathedral. As a result of study a reconstruction of Yaroslav Osmomysl's face was made.

== Issue ==
With his wife, Olga Yurievna of Suzdal (d. 14 July 1189), daughter of Prince Yury Dolgoruky he had four children:

- Vladimir(ko) (b. 1151 – d. 1199), Prince of Halicz (1188 and 1190–99), married to Boleslava (d. bef.1189), daughter of Great Prince Sviatoslav of Chernigov.
- Euphrosyne, famous for her song in "The Tale of Igor's Campaign"; married in 1184 to Prince Igor Svyatoslavich of Chernigov.
- Vysheslava (Wyszesława halicka; d. aft. 1200), married in 1184 to Prince Odon of Poznan.

One of his daughters was betrothed in 1167 to King Stephen III of Hungary, but he repudiated her one-year later (1168).

With his concubine Anastasia/Nastasia, he had one son:

- Oleg Yaroslavich "Nastasyich" (b. aft.1161 – d. poisoned at Halicz, 1188), Prince of Halicz (1187, 1189).

== See also ==
- List of rulers of Halych and Volhynia

Regnal titles
Preceded by Volodymyrko Volodarovych	Prince of Halych; 1153 — 1187	Succeeded by Oleg Yaroslavich
