= Vladimir III Igorevich =

Prince of Putivl and of Galicia

Vladimir III Igorevich (October 8, 1170– c. 1211) was Prince of Putivl and Prince of Galicia. He was the son of Igor Svyatoslavich and Euphrosyne Yaroslavna.

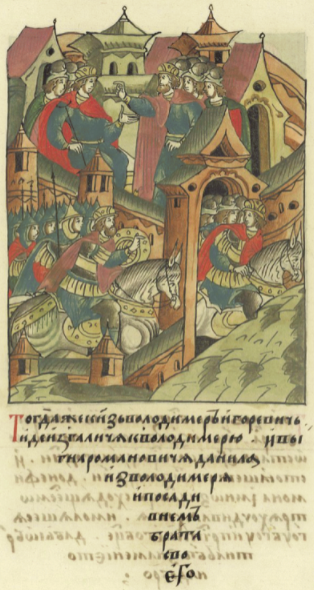
Prince Vladimir expels Daniil from Galich and places his brother Roman II Igorevich in power, miniature from the Illustrated Chronicle of Ivan the Terrible (16th century)

== Biography ==
He was with his father during his campaign against the Cumans on 13 April 1185, immortalized in the epic The Tale of Igor's Campaign; he participated in the first battle, wherein he set off ahead of the main group along with Svyatoslav Olgovich of Rylsk and defeated the Cuman forces. However, he was captured in the second battle by khans Gzak and Konchak. The Tale of Igor’s Campaign describes how, after Igor escaped from captivity, Gzak and Konchak debated whether to kill Vladimir or entice him into marrying a Cuman maiden:

Says Gzak to Končak:
“if the falcon [Igor] flies to its nest, —
let us shoot the falconet [Vladimir]
with our gilded arrows.”

Said Končak to Gzak:
“If the falcon flies to its nest,
let us snare the falconet
with a beautiful maiden.”

And said Gzak to Končak:
“If we snare him with a beautiful maiden,
we will have neither the falconet,
nor will we have the beautiful maiden,
so that the birds will begin to strike us
in the field of the Cumans.”

— The Lay of Igor’s Campaign

The Tale of Igor’s Campaign ends with Vladimir still captive to the khans. In the autumn of 1188, he returned home from captivity with Khan Konchak’s daughter Svoboda. Soon after, on 26 September, Rurik Rostislavich organized festivities to celebrate Vladimir’s wedding to Svoboda, attended by the rest of his family.

== Marriage and children ==
c. 1188: Svoboda, a daughter of Khan Konchak of the Donets Cumans

- Prince Izyaslav Vladimirovich (c. 1188–c. 1255) of Putivl;
- Prince Vsevolod Vladimirovich (c. 1188–c. 1210).

== Ancestors ==
Ancestors of Vladimir III Igorevich

16. Svyatoslav II Yaroslavich, grand prince of Kiev
8. Oleg Svyatoslavich, prince of Chernigov
17. Kilikia of Dithmarschen
4. Svyatoslav Igorevich, prince of Chernigov
18. Ossolur, Cuman khan
9. Unnamed
2. Igor Svyatoslavich, prince of Chernigov
10. Petrilla, posadnik of Novgorod
5. Catherine
1. Vladimir III Igorevich
24. Volodar Rostislavich, prince of Halych
12. Volodimirko Volodarovich, prince of Halych
25. Anna of Pommern
6. Yaroslav Volodimerovich, prince of Halych
3. Euphrosyne Yaroslavna
28. Vladimir II Vsevolodovich, grand prince of Kiev
14. Yuri Vladimirovich, grand prince of Kiev
29. Unnamed
7. Olga Yurevna
30. Khan Aepo of the Cumans
15. Unnamed

== Sources ==
- Benda, Kálmán (General Editor): Magyarország történeti kronológiája - I. kötet: A kezdetektől 1526-ig /A Historical Chronology of Hungary - Volume I: From the Beginnings to 1526/; Akadémiai Kiadó, 1981, Budapest; ISBN 963-05-2661-1 (the part of the book which describes the events of the period from 1197 to 1309 was written by László Solymosi).
- Dimnik, Martin: The Dynasty of Chernigov - 1146-1246; Cambridge University Press, 2003, Cambridge; ISBN 978-0521-03981-9.

Preceded by Igor Svyatoslavich	Prince of Putivl; 1180-1211 or after	Succeeded by Izyaslav Vladimirovich
Preceded by Daniil Romanovich	Prince of Galicia; 1206-1208	Succeeded by Roman II Igorevich
Preceded by Andrew I	Prince of Galicia; 1210-1211	Succeeded by Daniil Romanovich
