= Roman II =

Roman II may refer to:

- Roman the Great of Kiev (after 1160–1205)
- Roman II Igorevich (1177/1179–1211)
- Roman II of Moldavia (co-ruler of Moldova in 1447–1448)
- Roman II of Leibnitz (bishop of Gurk in 1174–1179)

== See also ==
- Romanos II (938–963), Byzantine Emperor
