= Sviatoslav III =

Sviatoslav III or Svyatoslav III may refer to:

- Sviatoslav III of Kiev (died in 1194)
- Svyatoslav III Igorevich (1176–1211)
- Sviatoslav III of Vladimir (1196–1252)
