= Sviatoslav Igorevich =

Sviatoslav or Svyatoslav Igorevich may refer to:

- Sviatoslav I of Kiev (942?- 972)
- Svyatoslav III Igorevich (1176 – 1211), Rus' prince
