= Igor Svyatoslavich =

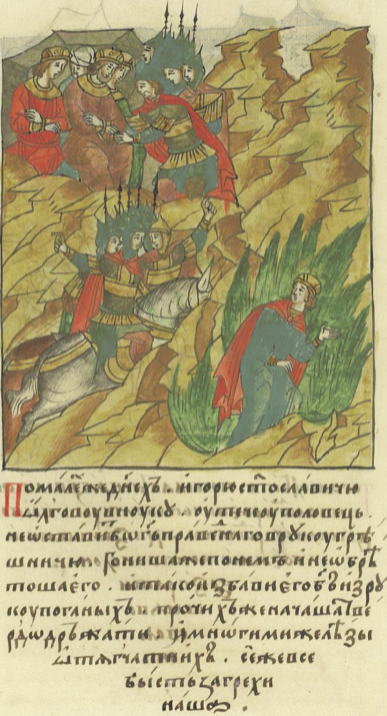
- The escape of Igor Svyatoslavich from Polovtsian captivity

Prince of Chernigov
- Reign: 1198–1201/2
- Predecessor: Yaroslav II Vsevolodovich
- Successor: Oleg III Svyatoslavich
- Born: 3 April 1151; Novgorod-Seversk
- Died: 1201 or 1202
- Spouse: Euphrosyne Yaroslavna
- Issue: Vladimir of Galicia; Unnamed daughter Svyatoslav III of Vladimir-Volynsk; Roman II of Galicia
- House: Olgovichi
- Father: Sviatoslav Olgovich
- Mother: Catherine of Chernigov
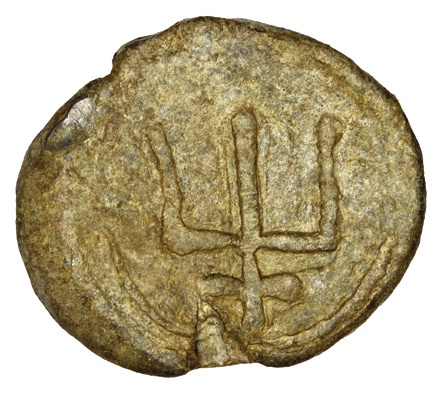
- Seal

Igor Svyatoslavich (Note: Old East Slavic: Игорь Святъславичь, romanized: Igorĭ Svjatŭslavičĭ; Russian: Игорь Святославич; Ukrainian: Ігор Святославич, romanized: Ihor Svyatoslavych, Ihor Sviatoslavych; Old Norse: Ingvar Sveinaldsson; Christian name: Yury) (3 April 1151 – c. 1201), nicknamed the Brave, was Prince of Novgorod-Seversk (1180–1198) and Prince of Chernigov (1198–1201/1202).

== Life ==
The son of Sviatoslav Olgovich, prince of Chernigov, in 1169 Igor took part in the war against Mstislav Iziaslavich of Kiev on the side of Andrey Bogolyubsky. In order to counter Cuman raids on the lands of southern Rus', in 1185 he organized a campaign against the nomads, without the knowledge of the Grand Prince of Kiev. After an initial victory, Igor's army was surrounded on the Kaiala River. The prince himself was captured, but managed to escape. After Igor's defeat, the Cumans raided the Principality of Pereyaslavl.

== In culture ==
Igor's defeat from the Cumans is the subject of the 13th century epic, The Tale of Igor's Campaign, whose central theme is the fate of Rus' territories during the period of feudal division between various princes. The work describes in detail Igor's preparations for the campaign and the course of the three-day battle between Rus' forces and the nomads. The text is concluded with a praise of the prince, his younger brother and comrade-in-arms Vsevolod Sviatoslavich, as well as his son Vladimir.

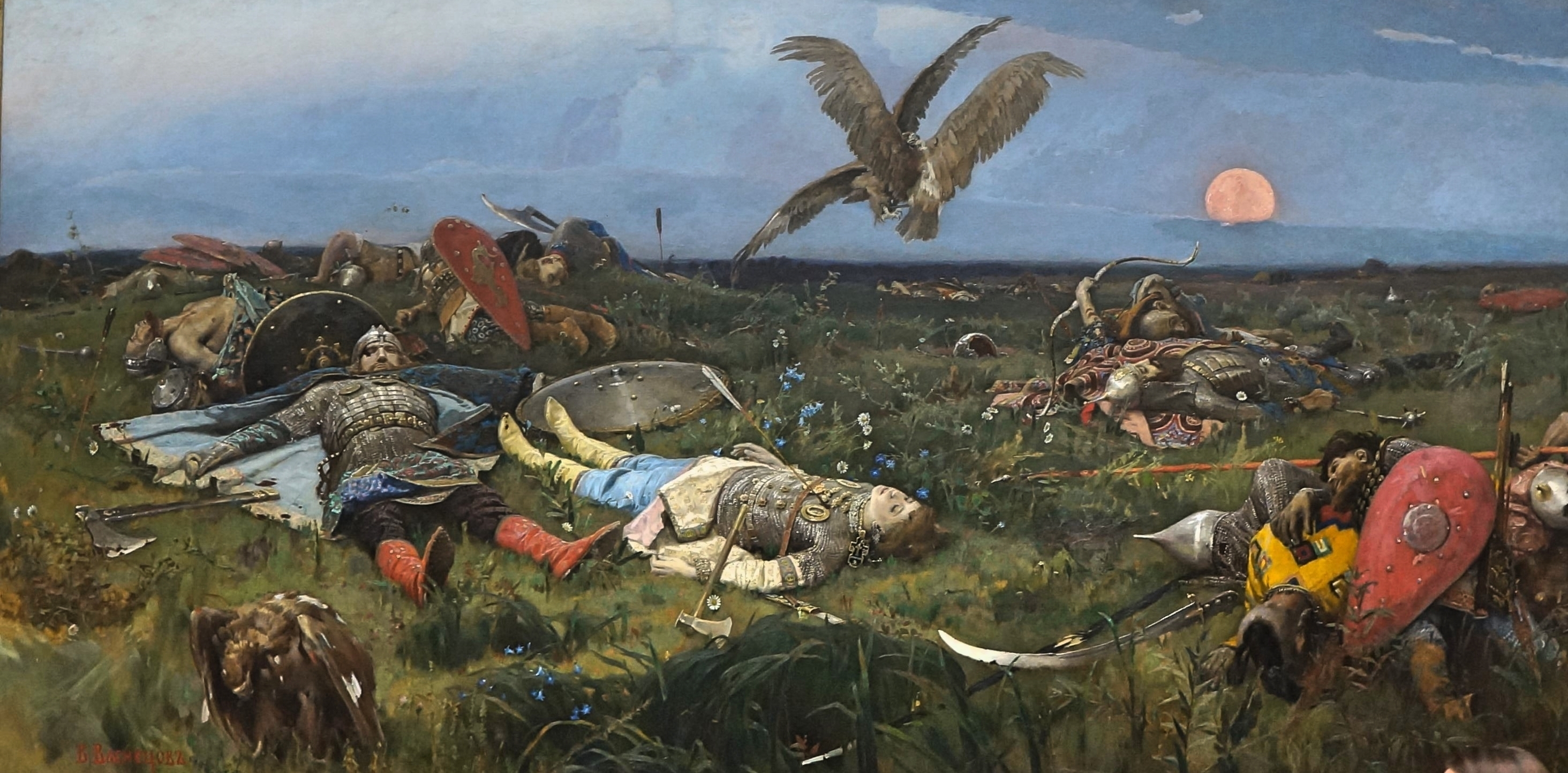
After the battle of Igor Svyatoslavich with the Cumans by 19th century artist Victor Mikhailovich Vasnetsov

== Marriage and children ==
Before 1170: Euphrosyne (possibly) (Note: Basing their observations on the evidence of the Lay of Igor’s Campaign, a number of historians have suggested that her name was Evfrosinia and that she may have been Igor’s second wife; on the other hand, the chronicles neither give Yaroslavna’s name nor suggest that she was Igor’s second wife) Yaroslavna, the second daughter of prince Yaroslav Osmomysl of Halych by his first wife Olga Yuryevna of Kiev

1. Prince Vladimir Igorevich of Galicia (October 8, 1170 – 1211 or after)
2. Unnamed Igorevna (1171/1173 – after 1196), wife of David Olegovich
3. Oleg Igorevich (b. 1174) died at an early age
4. Prince Svyatoslav III Igorevich of Vladimir-in-Volhynia (1176 – September, 1211)
5. Prince Roman II Igorevich of Galicia (1177/1179 – September, 1211)

== Ancestors ==
Ancestors of Igor Svyatoslavich

16. Yaroslav I Vladimirovich, grand prince of Kiev
8. Svyatoslav II Yaroslavich, grand prince of Kiev
17. Ingegerd of Sweden
4. Oleg I of Chernigov
18. Count Etheler of Dithmarschen
9. Kilikia of Dithmarschen
19. Ida of Elsdort
2. Sviatoslav Olgovich, prince of Chernigov
10. Ossolur, Cuman khan
5. Unnamed
1. Igor Svyatoslavich
6. Petrilla, posadnik of Novgorod
3. Catherine

== See also ==
- Prince Igor
- Cuman people
- Battle of Kalka River
- Solar eclipse of 1 May 1185

== Sources ==
- Dimnik, Martin: The Dynasty of Chernigov - 1146-1246; Cambridge University Press, 2003, Cambridge; ISBN 978-0-521-03981-9.
- Jellinek, George: History through the Opera Glass: From the Rise of Caesar to the Fall of Napoleon; Proscenium Publishers Inc., 2000, New York; ISBN 0-87910-284-5.
- Vernadsky, George: Kievan Russia; Yale University Press, 1948, New Haven and London; ISBN 0-300-01647-6.
- Zenkovsky, Serge A.: Medieval Russia’s Epics, Chronicles and Tales; Penguin Group, 1974; ISBN 978-0-452-01086-4.
- Dimnik, Martin. Battle of Kayala River (1185).The Encyclopedia of War 2011
- Anatoly Vorony. In Search of the River Kayala. Day, Kiev. 12 December, 2000
- Alexander IlYIN. SECRET OF THE BATTLE ON THE KAYALA RIVER. «VREMYA», Tuesday March 13 2001

Igor Svyatoslavich Olgovichi Born: 3 or 10 April 1151 Died: 1201 or 1202
Preceded by Oleg I Svyatoslavich	Prince of Putivl; 1164–1180	Succeeded by Vladimir I Igorevich
Preceded by Oleg II Svyatoslavich	Prince of Novgorod-Seversk; 1180–1198	Succeeded by Vladimir II Svyatoslavich
Preceded by Yaroslav II Vsevolodovich	Prince of Chernigov; 1198–1201/1202	Succeeded by Oleg III Svyatoslavich
