= Euphrosyne Yaroslavna =

Euphrosyne of Galicia
- Princess consort of Novhorod-Siverskyi
- Spouse: Igor Svyatoslavich
- Issue: Vladimir III Igorevich; Oleg Igorevich; Svyatoslav III Igorevich; Roman II Igorevich
- Dynasty: Rostislavichi
- Father: Yaroslav Osmomysl
- Mother: Olga Yurievna

Euphrosyne Yaroslavna (fl. 12th century) was the wife of Igor Svyatoslavich, Prince of Novgorod-Seversk and daughter of the Galician prince Yaroslav Osmomysl. She is one of the central characters in The Lay of Igor's Campaign. 'Yaroslavna's Lament' is considered one of the most poetic fragments of the Lay.

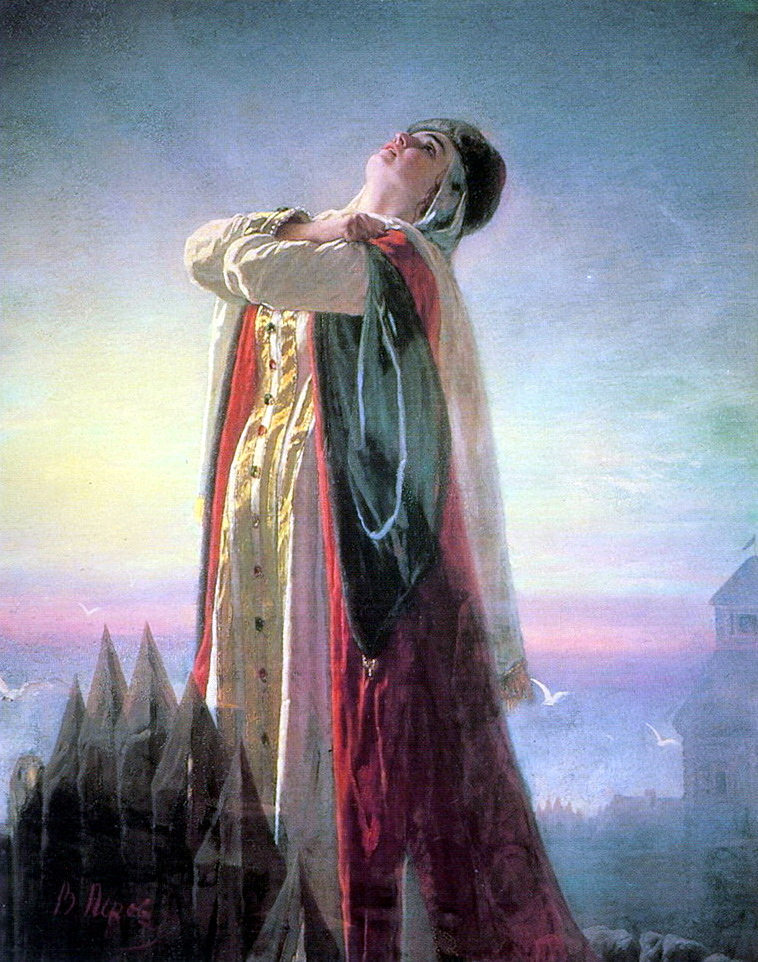
Yaroslavna's Lament, 1881 by Vasily Perov.

== Biography ==
The exact years of her life are unknown. Her name is not mentioned in the chronicles, but it is given in the 'Genealogy' of Catherine the Great. According to Alexander Soloviev, the name Euphrosyne goes back to the Lyubets Synodik, though doubt remains if this person is the same as the wife of Igor Svyatoslavich. It is also possible, that the name Euphrosyne (the monastic name of her mother) was mistakenly attributed to Yaroslavna.

Euphrosyne Yaroslavna was the daughter of the Galician prince Yaroslav Vladimirovich Osmomysl from his marriage to the Suzdal princess Olga Yurievna, daughter of Yuri Dolgorukiy, Grand Prince of Kyiv.

She and Igor Svyatoslavich were married around 1169. In some sources, she is said to be Igor's second wife, and the date of marriage is attributed to 1184. According to modern researchers, this date arose as a result of an inaccurate reading of Russian History by Vasily Tatishchev. It is accepted that Yaroslavna was the mother of all Igor's children. Seeing as their eldest son, Vladimir, was born in 1171, the later marriage date would be impossible.

== Legacy ==
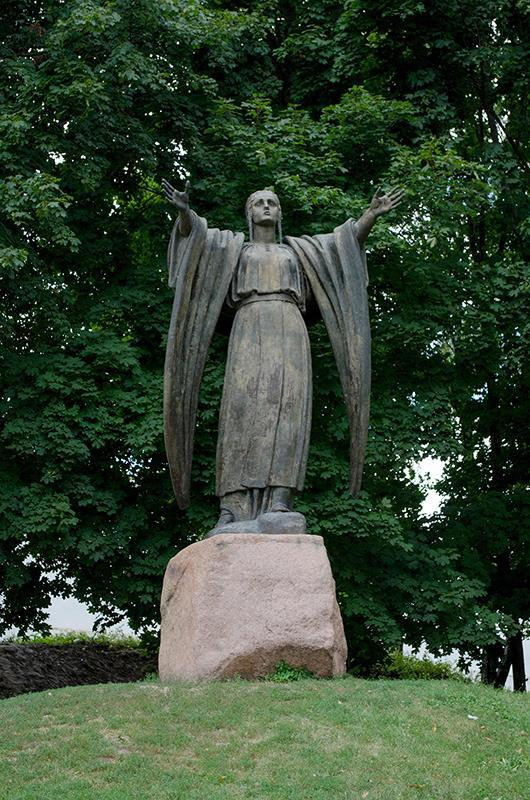
Monument to Euphrosyne Yaroslavna in Novhorod-Siverskyi

The Lay of Igor's Campaign tells of the unsuccessful campaign of Igor Svyatoslavich against the Polovtsians. 'Yaroslavna's Lament' in the third act of the Lay, is considered one of its most poetic fragments, which had a great influence on Russian culture and art. She is considered a symbol of a faithful wife who, thanks to her love, can save her husband on the battlefield. A large number of engraving, paintings, and drawings depict her. There is a ballet 'Yaroslavna (The Eclipse)', with music by Boris Tishchenko.

== Issue ==
Euphrosyne Yaroslavna and Igor Svyatoslavich (2 April 1151 - Spring 1201) married around 1169 and produced six children:

- Vladimir Igorevich (8 October 1170 - after 1211), Prince of Putivl (1185-1198 and 1208–1210), Prince of Novgorod-Seversky (1198–1206), Prince of Galicia (1206-1208 and 1210–1211)
- Oleg Igorevich (b. 1175)
- Svyatoslav Igorevich (1176 - September 1211), Prince of Vladimir-Volynsky (1205–1206), Prince of Przemysl (1209 and 1210–1211)
- Roman Igorevich (d. September 1211), Prince of Zvenigorod (1206-1207 and 1210–1211), Prince of Galicia (1207–1209)
- A daughter who in 1189, married David Olgovich, Prince of Starodubsky (d. 1195)
