= Putyvl Raion =

Former subdivision of Sumy Oblast, Ukraine

Putyvl Raion Путивльський район
- Raion
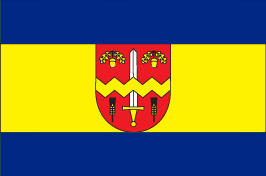
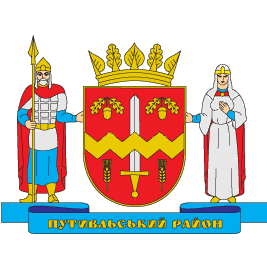
- Flag Coat of arms

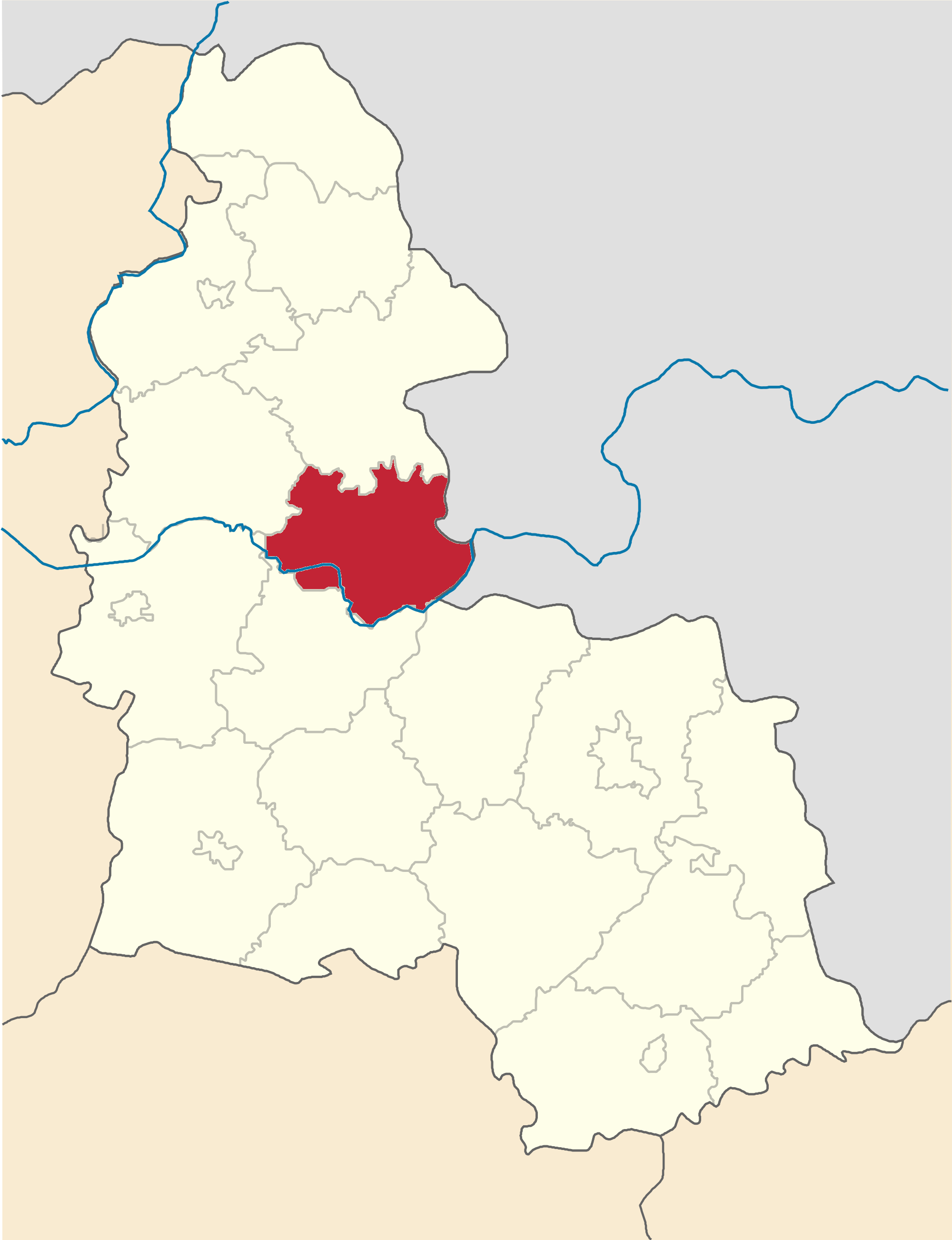
- Raion location in Sumy Oblast
- Coordinates: 51°22′15.9744″N 33°59′44.6172″E
- Country: Ukraine
- Oblast: Sumy Oblast
- Disestablished: 18 July 2020
- Admin. center: Putyvl

Area
  - Total: 1,100 km^{2} (420 sq mi)

Population (2020)
  - Total: 26,194
  - Density: 24/km^{2} (62/sq mi)
- Time zone: UTC+2 (EET)
  - Summer (DST): UTC+3 (EEST)
- Website: http://putivl-rda.gov.ua/

Putyvl Raion (Ukrainian: Путивльський район) was a raion in Sumy Oblast in Central Ukraine. The administrative center of the raion was the town of Putyvl. The raion was abolished on 18 July 2020 as part of the administrative reform of Ukraine, which reduced the number of raions of Sumy Oblast to five. The last estimate of the raion population was 26,194 (2020 est.).
