= Roman II Igorevich =

Roman II Igorevych (ukr. Роман Ігорович, 1177/1179 – September 1211) was an Olgovichi prince. He was prince of Zvenyhorod (1206–1208, 1210–1211), and of Halych (1208, 1208–1209).

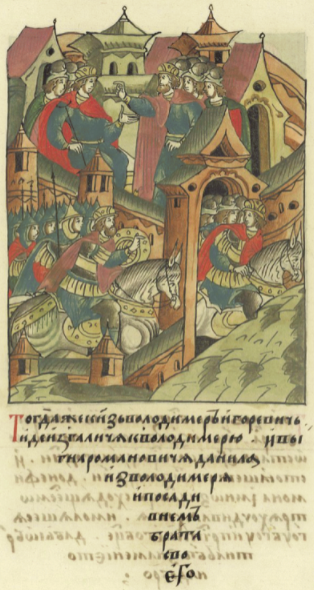
Prince Vladimir expels Daniil from Galich and places his brother Roman II Igorevich in power, miniature from the Illustrated Chronicle of Ivan the Terrible (16th century)

He was son of Igor Svyatoslavich and Euphrosyne Yaroslavna, the second daughter of prince Yaroslav Volodimerovich of Halych by his first wife Olga Yuryevna of Kiev. His brothers were Vladimir III Igorevich and Svyatoslav III Igorevich.

== Ancestors ==
Ancestors of Roman II Igorevich

16. Svyatoslav II Yaroslavich, grand prince of Kiev
8. Oleg Svyatoslavich, prince of Chernigov
17. Kilikia of Dithmarschen
4. Svyatoslav Igorevich, prince of Chernigov
18. Ossolur, Cuman khan
9. Unnamed
2. Igor Svyatoslavich, prince of Chernigov
10. Petrilla, posadnik of Novgorod
5. Catherine
1. Roman II Igorevich
24. Volodar Rostislavich, prince of Halych
12. Volodimirko Volodarovich, prince of Halych
25. Anna of Pommern
6. Yaroslav Volodimerovich, prince of Halych
3. Euphrosyne Yaroslavna
28. Vladimir II Vsevolodovich, grand prince of Kiev
14. Yuri Vladimirovich, grand prince of Kiev
29. Unnamed
7. Olga Yurevna
30. Khan Aepo of the Cumans
15. Unnamed

== Sources ==
- Benda, Kálmán (General Editor): Magyarország történeti kronológiája - A kezdetektől 1526-ig /A Historical Chronology of Hungary - From the Beginnings to 1526/; Akadémiai Kiadó, 1981, Budapest; ISBN 963-05-2661-1 (the part of the book which describes the events of the period from 1197 to 1309 was written by László Solymosi).
- Dimnik, Martin: The Dynasty of Chernigov - 1146-1246; Cambridge University Press, 2003, Cambridge; ISBN 978-0-521-03981-9.

Preceded by (part of the Principality of Halych)	Prince of Zvenigorod; 1206–1208	Succeeded by (part of the Principality of Halych)
Preceded by Vladimir III Igorevich	Prince of Halych; 1208	Succeeded by Rostislav I Rurikovich
Preceded by Rostislav I Rurikovich	Prince of Halych; 1208–1209	Succeeded by Andrew I
Preceded by (part of the Principality of Halych)	Prince of Zvenigorod; 1210–1211	Succeeded by (part of the Principality of Halych)
