= Putyvl =

City in Sumy Oblast, Ukraine

Putyvl Путивль
- City
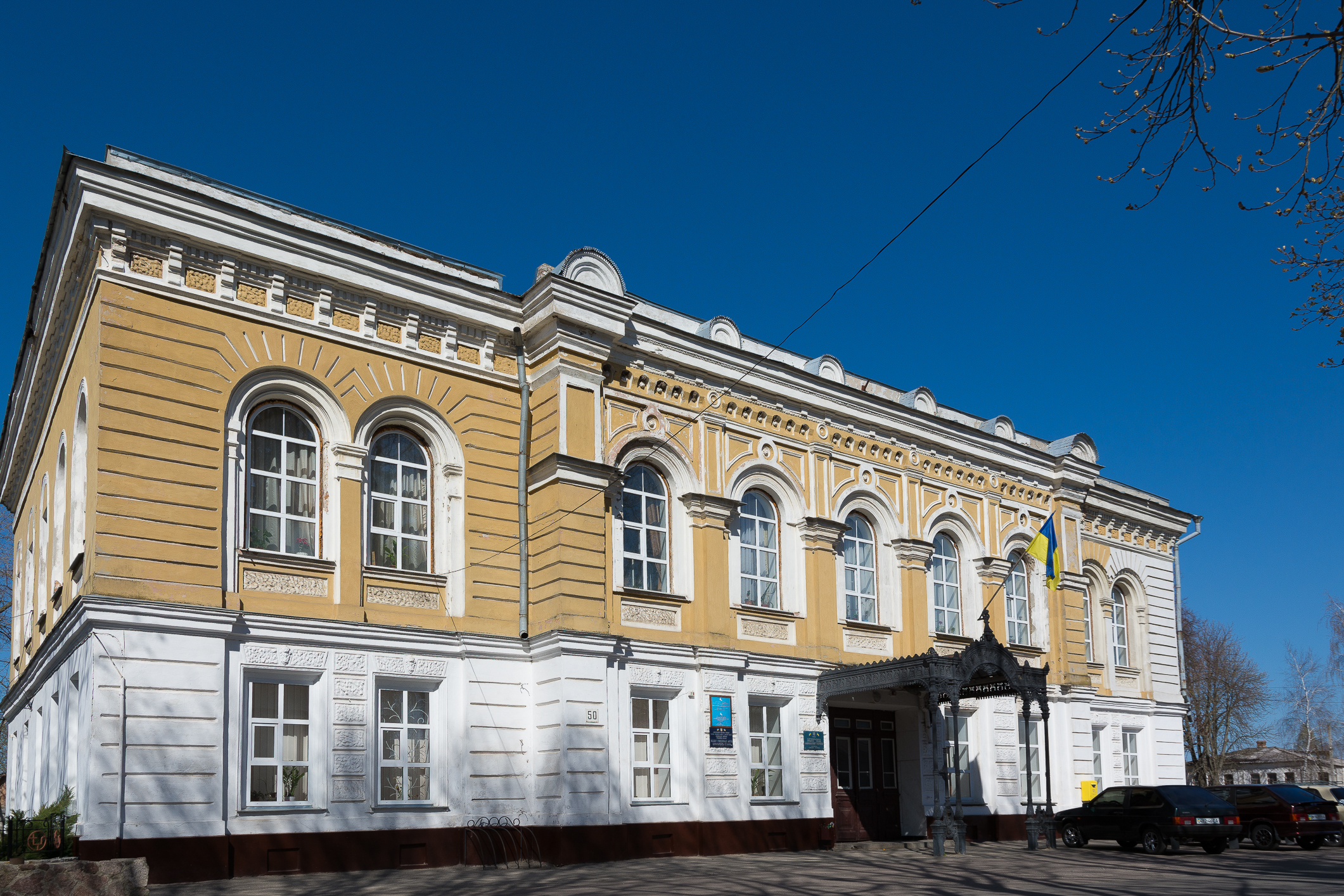
- Former zemstvo administration

- Flag Seal
- Interactive map of Putyvl
- Location in Ukraine Putyvl (Sumy Oblast)
- Coordinates: 51°19′N 33°52′E
- Country: Ukraine
- Oblast: Sumy Oblast
- Raion: Konotop Raion
- Hromada: Putyvl urban hromada
- First mentioned: 1146

Area
  - Total: 8.5 km^{2} (3.3 sq mi)
- Elevation: 177 m (581 ft)

Population (2022)
  - Total: 14,886

Putyvl (Ukrainian: Путивль, IPA: [pʊˈtɪu̯lʲ]; Russian: Путивль, IPA: [pʊˈtʲivlʲ]) is a city in Sumy Oblast, in north-east Ukraine. The city served as the administrative center of Putyvl Raion until the administrative reform in 2020; now it is under the jurisdiction of Konotop Raion. Population: 14,886 (2022 estimate).

== History ==
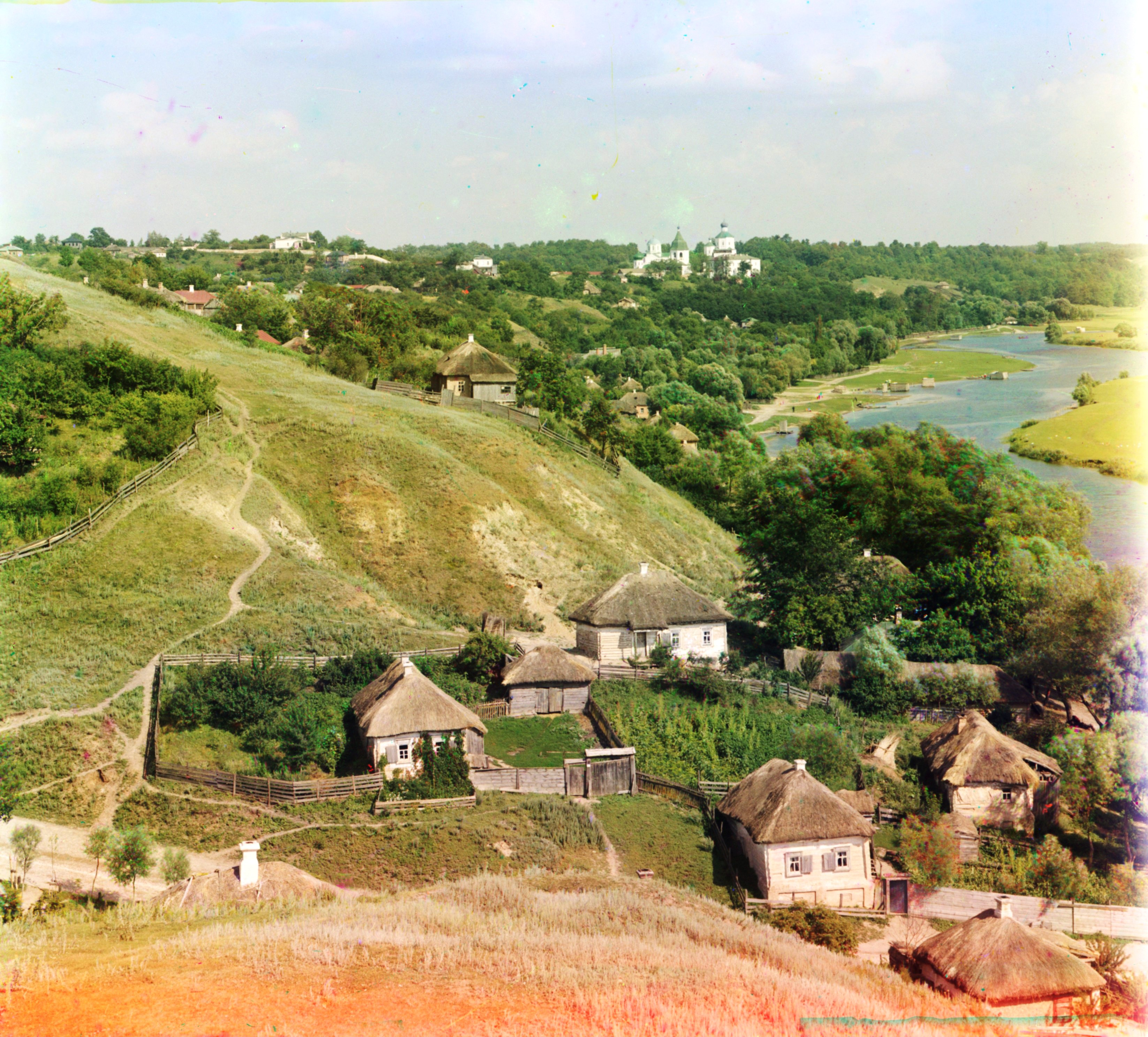
Putyvl, Prokudin-Gorskiy, start of the 1900s

One of the original Siverian towns, Putyvl was first mentioned as early as 1146 as an important fortress contested between Chernihiv and Novhorod-Siverskyi principalities of Kievan Rus. The song of Yaroslavna on the walls of Putyvl is the emotional culmination of the medieval Lay of Igor's Campaign and Alexander Borodin's opera Prince Igor.

In the 14th century, it was captured by Lithuania. After the Battle of Vedrosha in 1500, Putyvl was ceded to Muscovy. During the Time of Troubles, the town became the center of Ivan Bolotnikov's uprising and briefly a base for the False Dmitry I forces. It was occupied by Polish–Lithuanian Commonwealth between 1607 and 1619.

Putyvl was part of Kursk Governorate of the Russian Empire prior to the Bolshevik Revolution. Putyvl, along with some surrounding villages, was transferred to the Ukrainian SSR on 16 October 1925. During the Second World War, Putyvl was under German occupation between 10 September 1941 and 3 September 1943. Soviet partisans led by Sydir Kovpak participated in guerrilla warfare against the Germans in the forests all over Northern Ukraine.

Putyvl was occupied by Russian troops early in the 2022 Russian invasion of Ukraine.

== Architecture ==
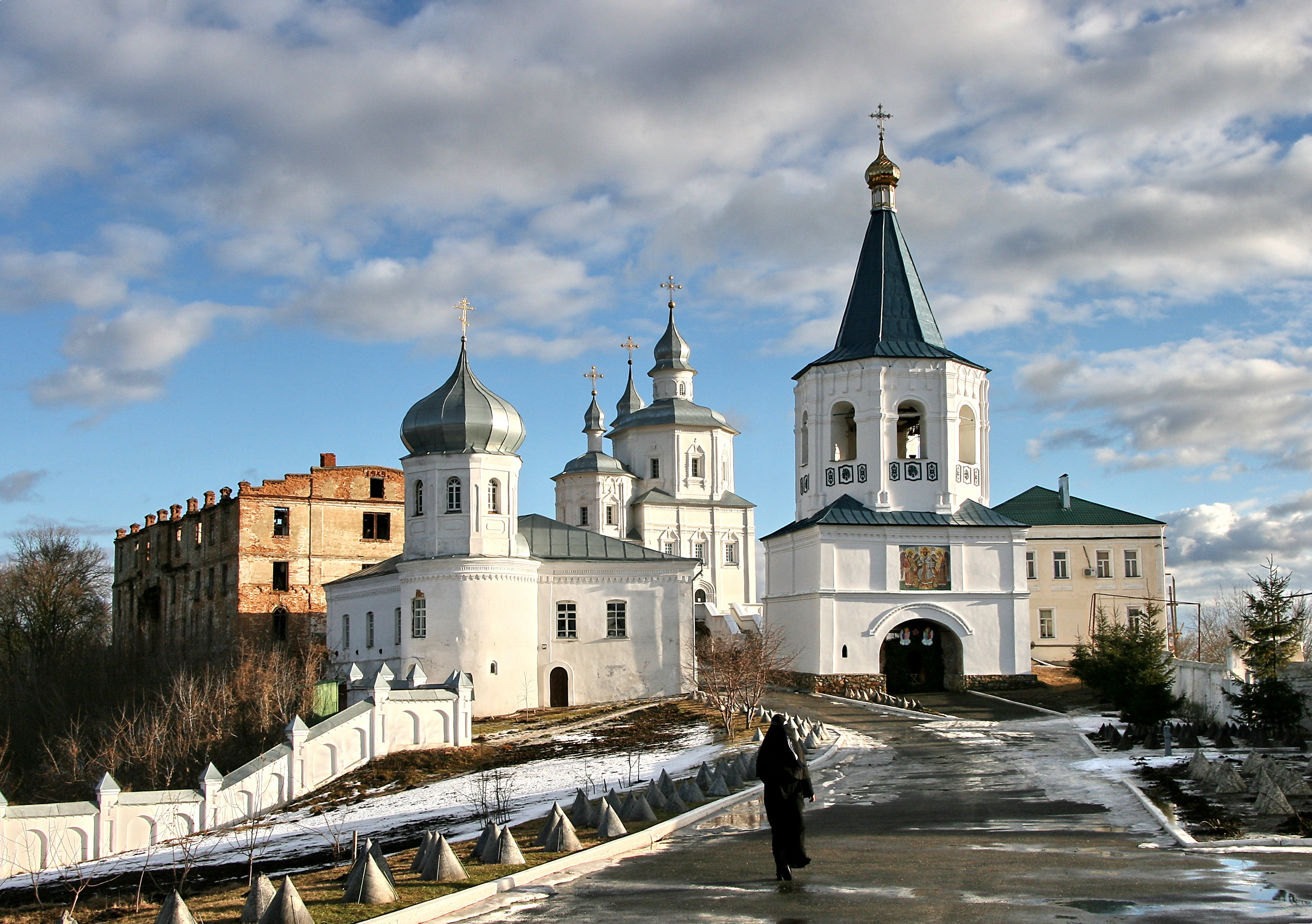
The Movchanskyi Monastery

The main architectural monument of Putyvl is the Movchanskyi Monastery, which dates largely to the 17th century. The foundations of its three-domed cathedral, dedicated to the Nativity of the Theotokos, belong to the 1590s, but the main part of the church is one of the earliest Baroque structures in the region, described in its entirety by Paul of Aleppo in 1654. The cathedral displays strong influence of Muscovite architecture, especially in detailing and sculptural decor.

Apart from the monastery, Putyvl also possesses the Cossack Baroque Church of St. Nicholas (1735–37) and the Saviour Cathedral, a singular hybrid of Ukrainian and Russian church architecture, started in 1617 and incorporating such typically Muscovite features as onion domes. Remaining parts of 17th-century fortifications are visible close at hand; these include the gates and several towers, one of which was built up into a bell tower in 1700.

== Demographics ==
According to the 2001 Ukrainian census, the settlement had a population of 17,274 inhabitants. Putyvl is home to a large Russian population, which makes up a bit less than half of the town's population. For comparison, ethnic Russians only account for 9,4% of the total population of the Sumy Oblast. The city is the only settlement in the region with a population of more than 10.000 inhabitants, in which the majority speaks the Russian language natively. The exact ethnic and linguistic composition was as follows:

Ethnic groups in Putyvl
	percent
Ukrainians	50.52%
Russians	48.52%
Belarusians	0.31%
others	0.16%

First languages in Putyvl
	percent
Russian	62.9%
Ukrainian	36.8%
Belarusian	0.1%
others	0.1%

== Gallery ==
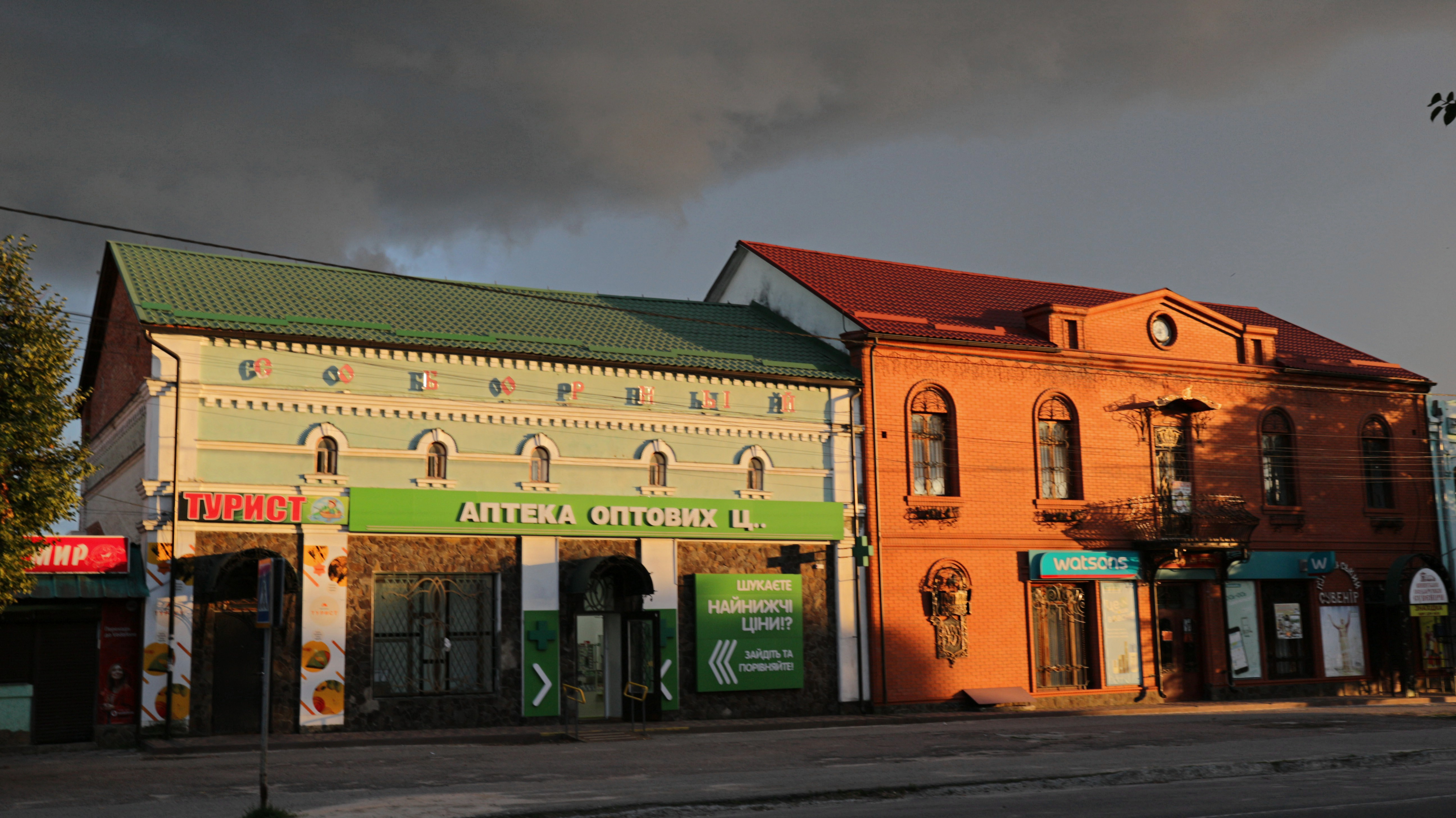
Historic shops in the old town

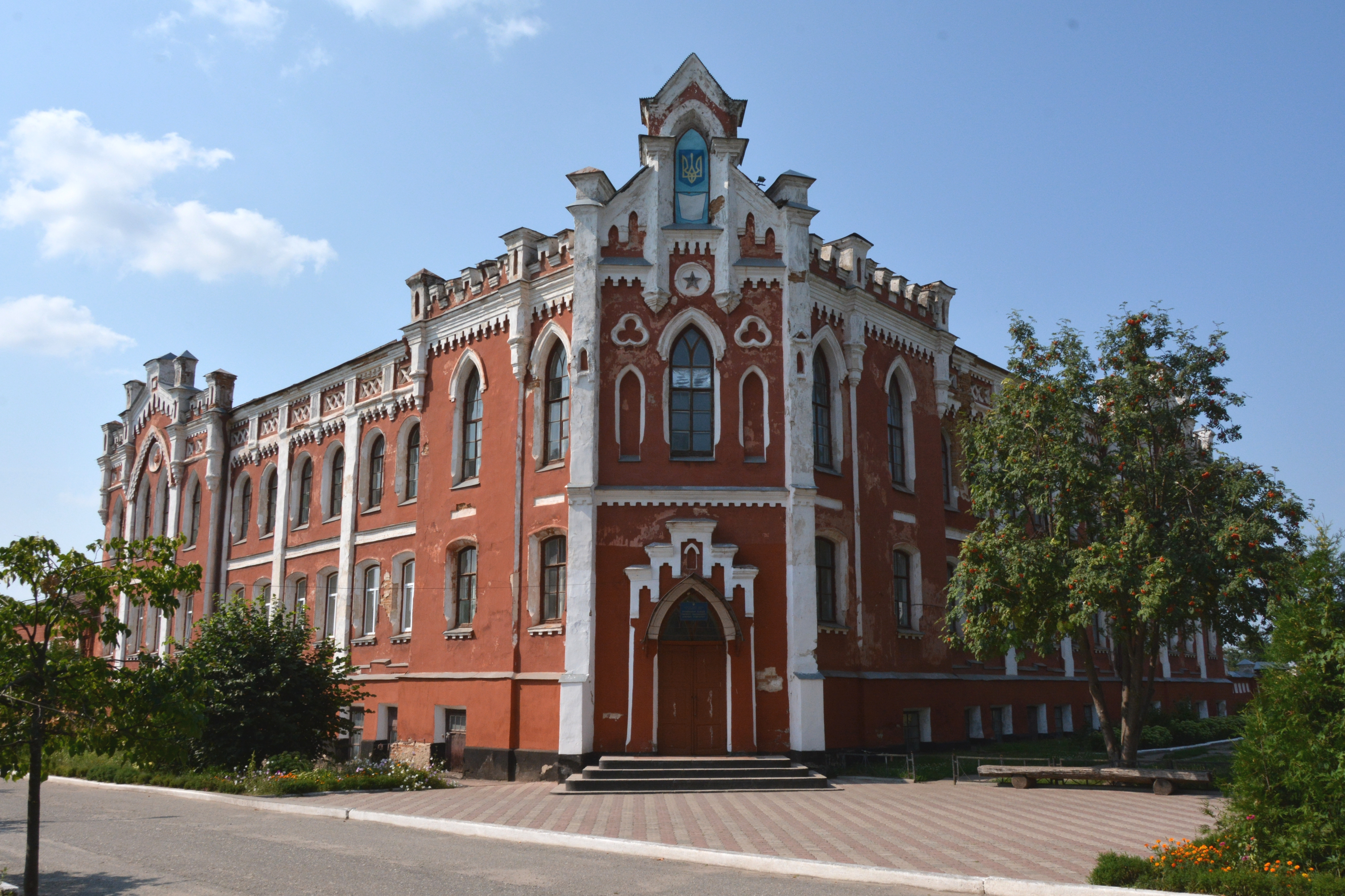
Former crafts school

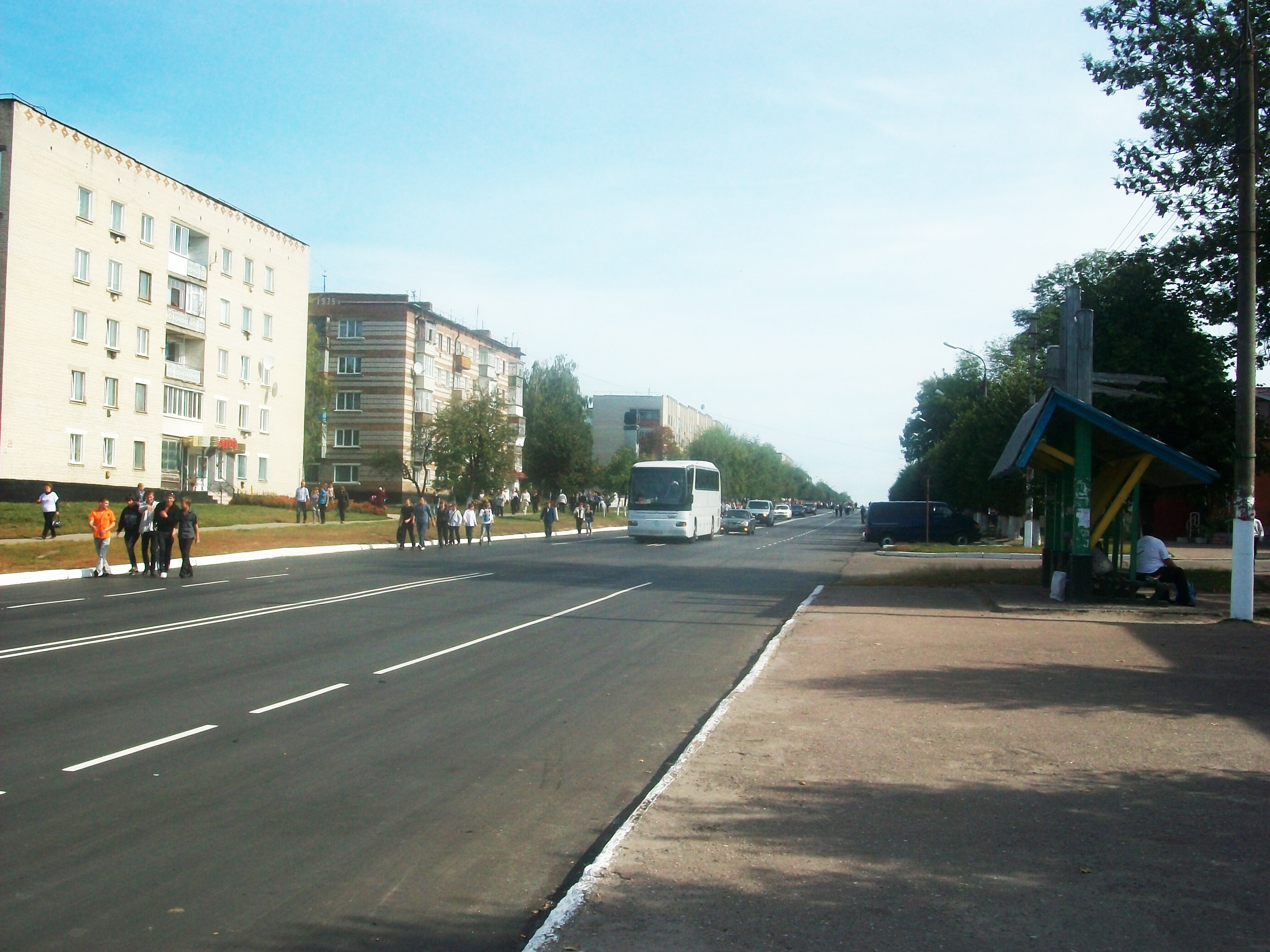
Main street

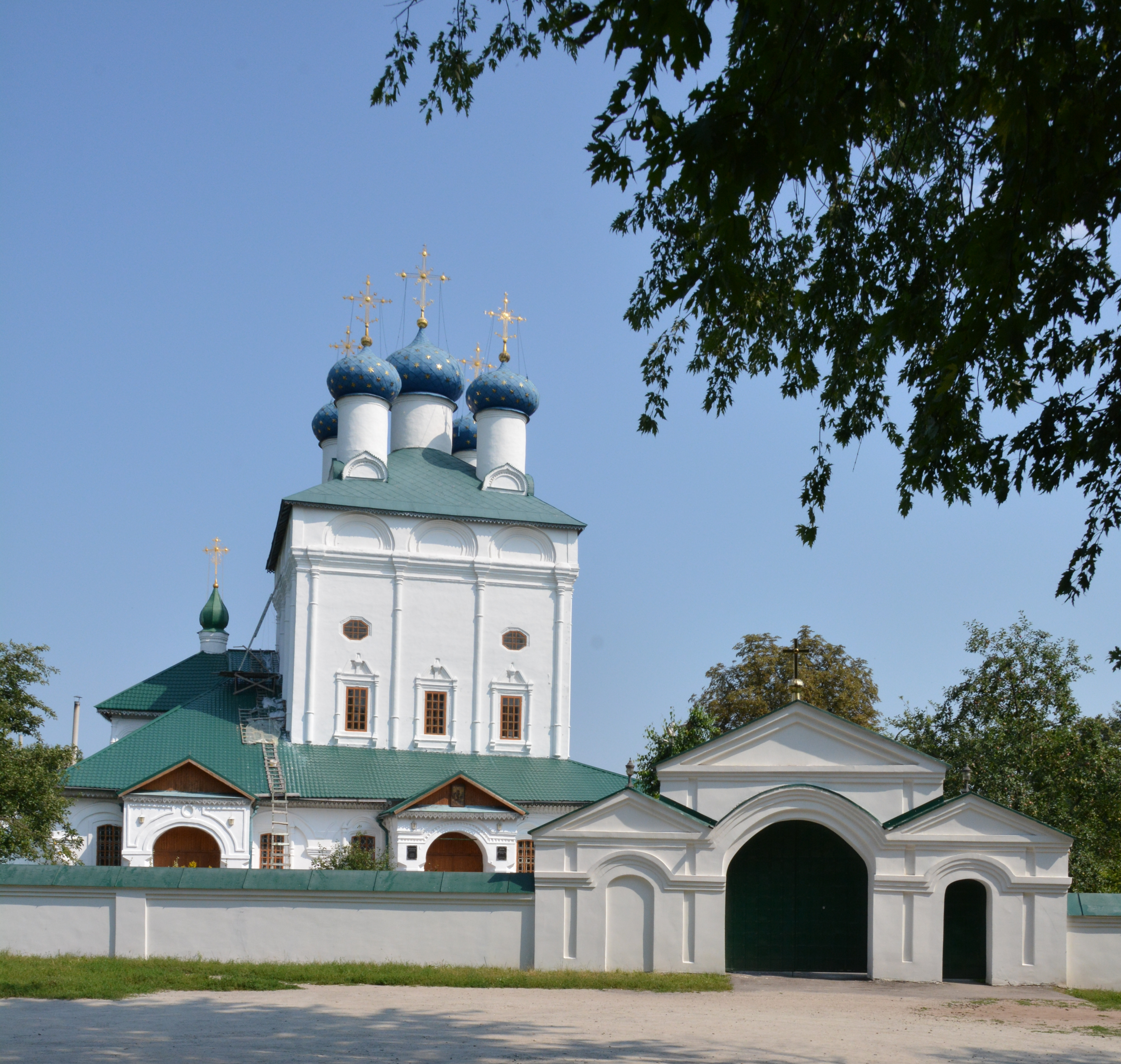
Holy Spirit Cathedral

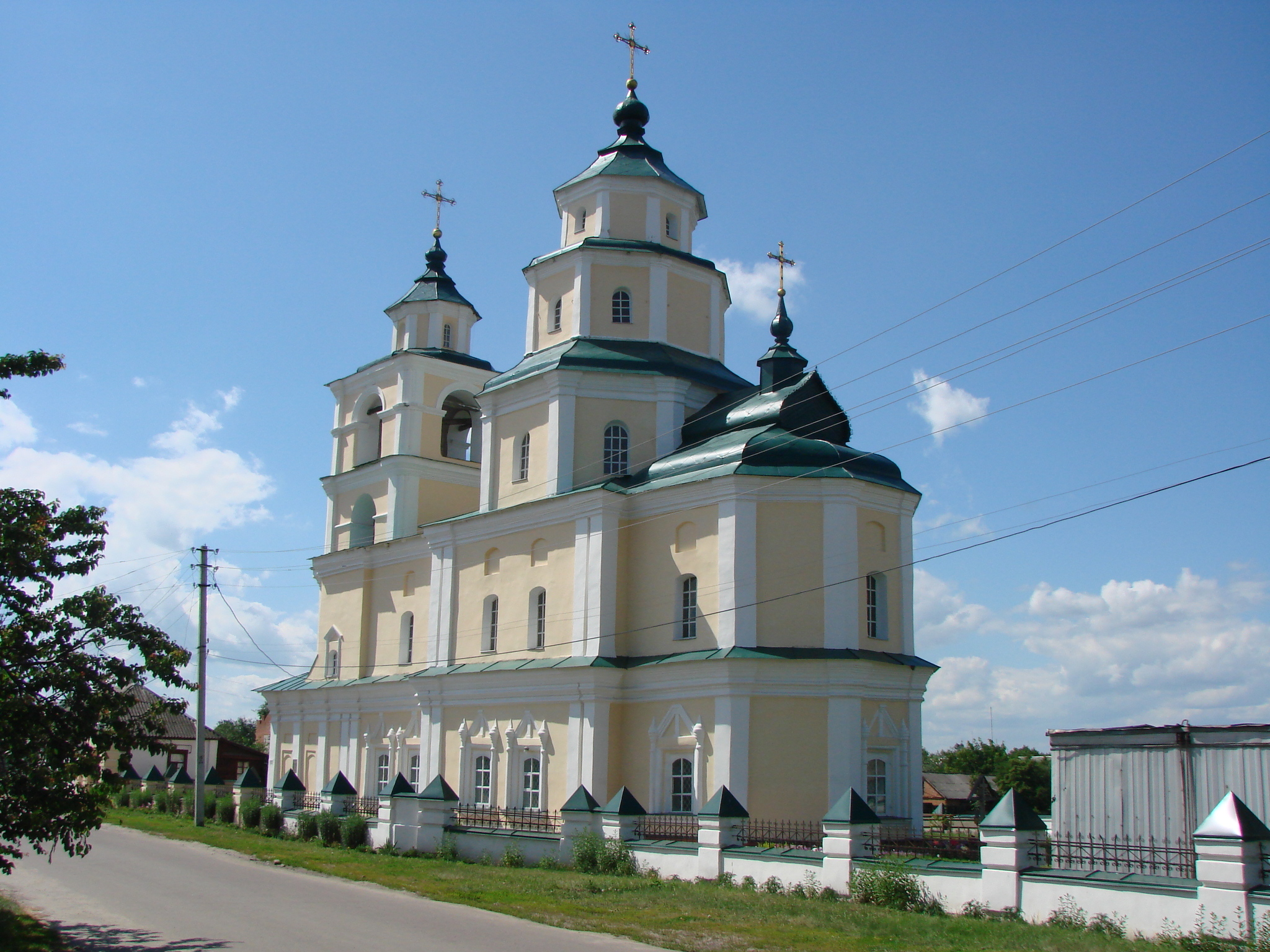
St. Nicholas Church

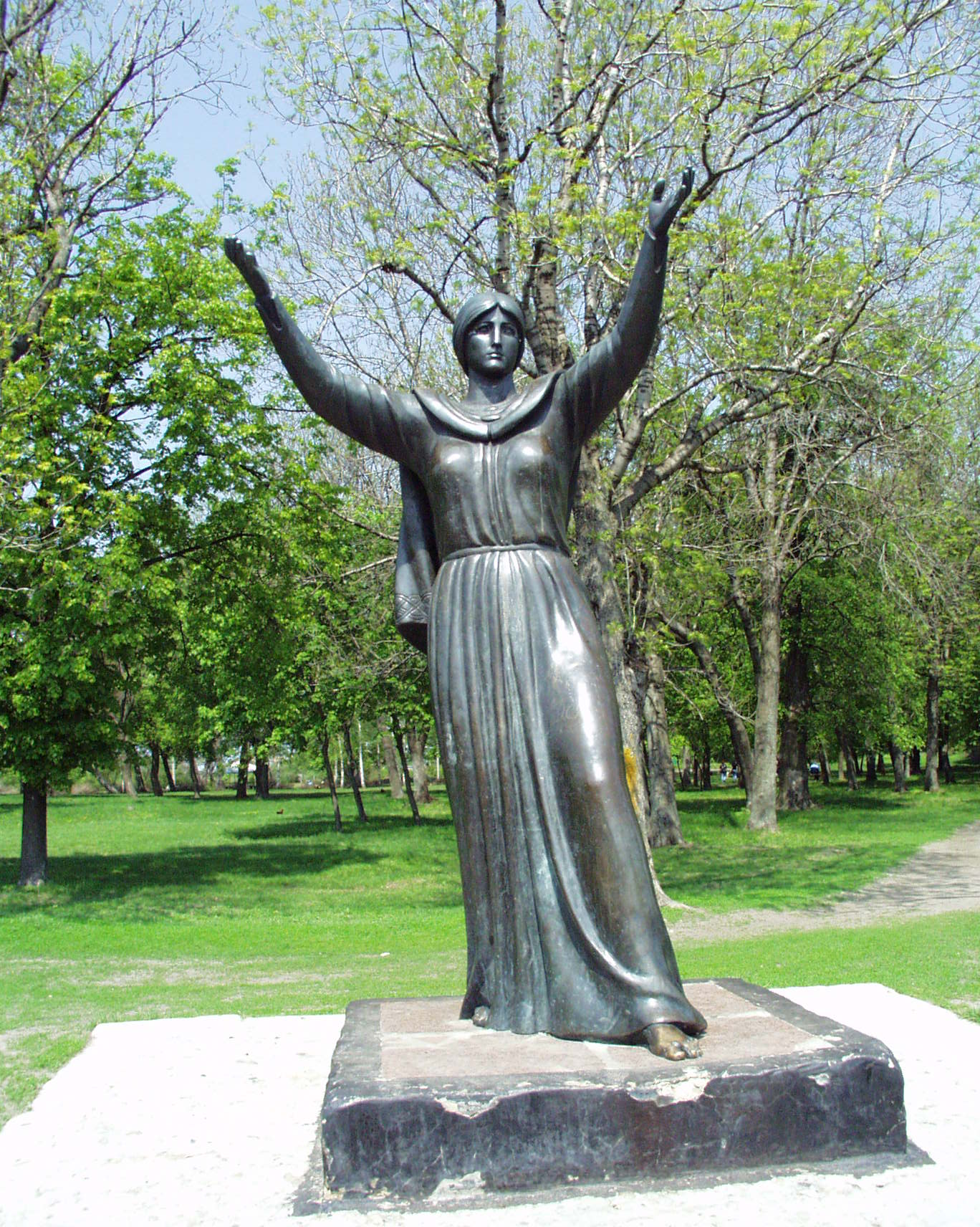
Princess Yaroslavna monument

== See also ==
- Bibliography of Russian history
