= The Tale of Igor's Campaign =

12th century Old East Slavic heroic poem

Full PDF of the first publication of The Tale of Igor's Campaign (Moscow 1800) by Aleksei Musin-Pushkin

The Tale of Igor's Campaign (Note: The title is occasionally translated as The Tale of the Campaign of Igor, The Song of Igor's Campaign, The Lay of Igor's Campaign, The Lay of the Host of Igor, and The Lay of the Warfare Waged by Igor.) (Old East Slavic: Слово о пълкѹ Игоревѣ, romanized: Slovo o pŭlku Igorevě) is an anonymous epic poem written in the Old East Slavic language. The poem gives an account of a failed raid of Igor Svyatoslavich (d. 1202) against the Polovtsians of the Don River region. While some have disputed the authenticity of the poem, the current scholarly consensus is that the poem is authentic and dates to the Middle Ages (late 12th century). (Note: The poem proposes to cover the tale "from the elder Vladímir up to our contemporary Ígoŕ" (отъ стараго Владимера до нынѣшняго Игоря), indicating composition before Svyatoslavich's death in 1202.)

The Tale of Igor's Campaign was adapted by Alexander Borodin as an opera and became one of the great classics of Russian theatre. Entitled Prince Igor, it was first performed in 1890.

== Content ==
The story describes a failed raid made in the year 1185 by Igor Svyatoslavich, Prince of Novgorod-Seversk, on the Polovtsians—the name given to the nomadic Cumans in Rus' sources—living along the lower Don. Other Rus' historical figures are mentioned, including skald Boyan (The Bard), the princes Vseslav of Polotsk, Yaroslav Osmomysl of Halych, and Vsevolod the Big Nest of Suzdal. The author appeals to the warring Rus' princes and pleads for unity in the face of the constant threat from the Turkic East. Igor's campaign is recorded in the Kievan Chronicle (c. 1200).

The descriptions show coexistence between Christianity and ancient Slavic religion. Igor's wife Yaroslavna invokes natural forces from the walls of Putyvl. Christian motifs are presented along with depersonalised pagan gods among the artistic images. The main themes of the story are patriotism, the power and role of nature (at the time of the story, 12th century) and homeland. The main idea is the unity of people.

The Tale has been compared to other national epics, including The Song of Roland and The Song of the Nibelungs. The book however differs from contemporary Western epics on account of its numerous and vivid descriptions of nature and the portrayal of the role which nature plays in human lives.

== Discovery and publication ==
The only manuscript of the Tale, claimed to be dated to the 15th century, was discovered in 1795 in the library of the Transfiguration Monastery in Yaroslavl, where the first library and school in Russia had been established in the 12th century, but there is a controversy about its source. Monastery superior Joel (Bykovsky) sold the manuscript to a local landowner, Aleksei Musin-Pushkin, as a part of a collection of ten texts. Aleksei realised the value of the book and made a transcription for the empress Catherine the Great in 1795 or 1796. He published it in 1800 with the help of Alexei Malinovsky and Nikolai Bantysh-Kamensky, leading Russian paleographers of the time. The original manuscript was claimed to have burned in the great Moscow fire of 1812 (during the Napoleonic occupation), together with Musin-Pushkin's entire library.

The release of this historical work into scholarly circulation created a stir in Russian literary circles, as the tale represented the earliest Slavonic language writing, without any element of Church Slavonic. After linguistic analysis, Ukrainian scholars in the Austrian Empire declared that the document contained transitional language between a) earlier fragments of the language of Rus' propria (the region of Chernigov, eastward through Kiev, and into Halych) and, b) later fragments from the Halych-Volynian era of this same region in the centuries immediately following the writing of the document.

The Russian-American author Vladimir Nabokov translated the work into English in 1960. Other notable editions include the standard Soviet edition, prepared with an extended commentary, by the academician Dmitry Likhachev.

== Authenticity debate ==
According to the majority view, the poem is a composition of the late 12th century, perhaps composed orally and fixed in written form at some point during the 13th century. Some scholars consider the possibility that the poem in its current form is a national Romanticist compilation and rearrangement of several authentic sources. The thesis of the poem's being a complete forgery has been proposed in the past but is widely discredited; the poem's language has been demonstrated to be closer to authentic medieval East Slavic than practicable by a late 18th-century forger. It was not until 1951 that scholars discovered ancient birch bark documents with content in this medieval language.

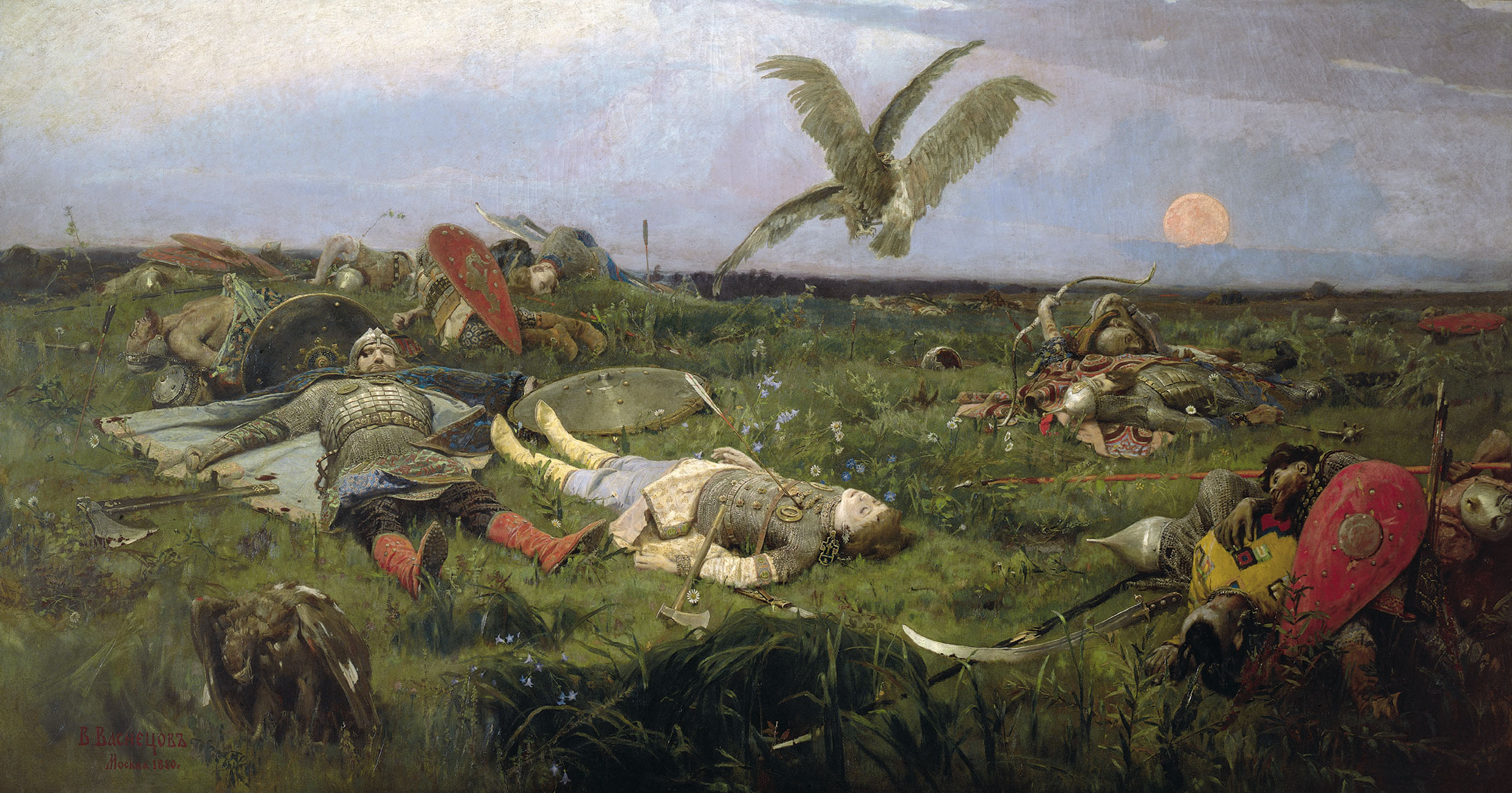
The field of Igor Svyatoslavich's battle with the Polovtsy (1880) by Viktor Vasnetsov.

One of the crucial points of the authenticity controversy is the relationship between The Tale of Igor's Campaign and Zadonschina, an unquestionably authentic poem, which was created around the end of the 1300s or the beginning of the 1400s to glorify Dmitri Donskoi's victory over Mongol-Tatar troops of the ruler in the Golden Horde Mamai in the Battle of Kulikovo and is preserved in six medieval copies. There are almost identical passages in both texts where only the personal names are different. The traditional point of view considers Zadonschina to be a late imitation, with Slovo as its pattern. The forgery version claims the reverse: that Igor's Tale was written using Zadonschina as a source. Recently, Roman Jakobson's and Andrey Zaliznyak's analyses show that the passages of Zadonschina with counterparts in Slovo differ from the rest of the text by several linguistic parameters, whereas this is not so for Igor's Tale. This fact is taken as evidence of Slovo being the original with respect to Zadonschina. Zaliznyak also points out that the passages in Zadonschina which parallel those in the Igor's Tale but differ from it can be explained only if Slovo was the source for Zadonshchina (the differences can be the result of the distortion of the original Slovo text by the author and different editors of Zadonshchina versions), but not vice versa.

Proponents of the forgery thesis give sometimes contradictory arguments: some authors (Mazon) see numerous Gallicisms in the text; while others (Trost, Haendler) see Germanisms, yet others (Keenan) Bohemisms. Zimin is certain that the author could only be Ioil Bykovsky, while Keenan is equally sure that only Josef Dobrovsky could be the falsifier.

Current dialectology upholds Pskov and Polotsk as the two cities where the Tale was most likely written. Numerous persons have been proposed as its authors, including Prince Igor and his brothers. Other authors consider the epic to have emerged in Southern Rus', with many elements corresponding to modern Ukrainian language.

=== Early reactions ===
After the only manuscript copy of the Tale was destroyed in the Napoleonic invasion of 1812, questions about its authenticity were raised, mostly because of its language. Suspicion was also fueled by contemporary fabrications (for example, the Songs of Ossian, proved to be written by James Macpherson). Today, majority opinion accepts the authenticity of the text, based on the similarity of its language and imagery with those of other texts discovered after the Tale.

Proposed as forgers were Aleksei Musin-Pushkin, or the Russian manuscript forgers Anton Bardin and Alexander Sulakadzev. (Bardin was publicly exposed as the forger of four copies of Slovo). Josef Sienkowski, a journalist and Orientalist, was one of the notable early proponents of the falsification theory.

=== Soviet period ===
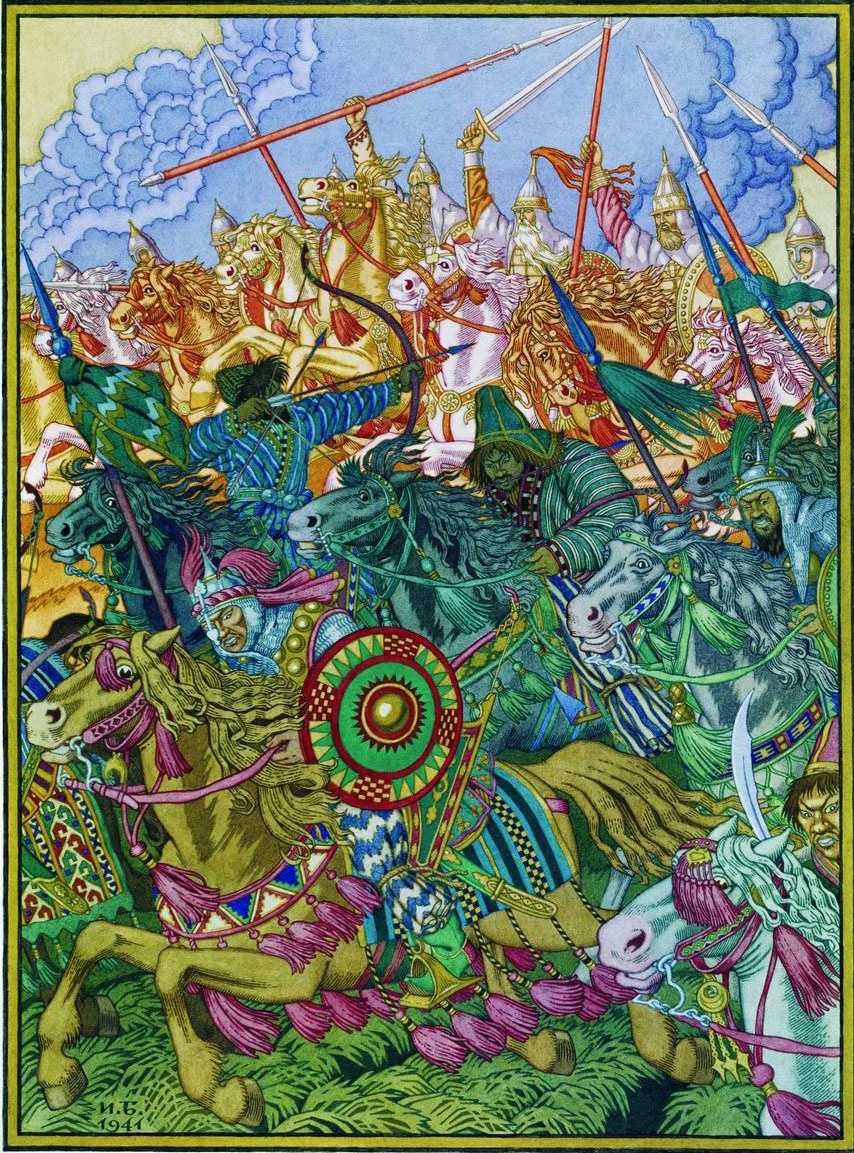
Soviet Russian artist Ivan Bilibin's illustration to the tale, 1941

The problem of the national text became more politicized during the years of the Soviet Union. Any attempts to question the authenticity of Slovo (for example, by the French Slavist André Mazon or by the Russian historian Alexander Zimin) were condemned. Government officials also repressed and condemned non-standard interpretations based on Turkic lexis, such as was proposed by Olzhas Suleimenov (who considered Igor's Tale to be an authentic text). Mazon's and Zimin's views were opposed, for example, by Roman Jakobson.

In 1975, Olzhas Suleimenov challenged the mainstream view of the Tale in his book Az i Ya. He claimed to reveal that Tale cannot be completely authentic since it appeared to have been rewritten in the 16th century.

Mainstream Slavists, including Dmitri Likhachev, and Turkologists criticized Az i Ya, characterizing Suleimenov's etymological and paleography conjectures as amateurish. Linguists such as Zaliznyak pointed out that certain linguistic elements in Slovo dated from the 15th or 16th centuries, when the copy of the original manuscript (or of a copy) had been made. They noted this was a normal feature of copied documents, as copyists introduce elements of their own orthography and grammar, as is known from many other manuscripts. Zaliznyak points out that this evidence constitutes another argument for the authenticity of Slovo. An anonymous forger would have had not only to imitate very complex 12th century orthography and grammar but also to introduce fake complex traces of the copying in the 15th or 16th centuries.

=== Recent views ===
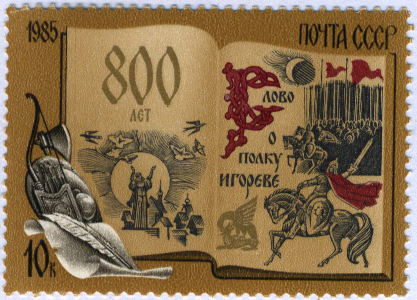
800th anniversary of The Tale on a 1985 USSR commemorative stamp

While some historians and philologists continue to question the text's authenticity for various reasons (for example, believing that it has an uncharacteristically modern nationalistic sentiment) (Omeljan Pritsak inter alios), linguists are not so skeptical. The overall scholarly consensus accepts Slovo's authenticity.

Some scholars believe the Tale has a purpose similar to that of the Kralovedvorsky Manuscript. For instance, the Harvard historian Edward L. Keenan says in his article, "Was Iaroslav of Halych really shooting sultans in 1185?" and in his book Josef Dobrovsky and the Origins of the Igor's Tale (2003), that Igor's Tale is a fake, written by the Czech scholar Josef Dobrovský.

Other scholars contend that it is a recompilation and manipulation of several authentic sources put together similarly to Lönnrot's Kalevala.

In his 2004 book, the Russian linguist Andrey Zaliznyak analyzes arguments and concludes that the forgery theory is virtually impossible. It was not until the late 20th century, after hundreds of bark documents were unearthed in Novgorod, that scholars learned that some of the puzzling passages and words of the tale were part of common speech in the 12th century, although they were not represented in chronicles and other formal written documents. Zaliznyak concludes that no 18th-century scholar could have imitated the subtle grammatical and syntactical features in the known text. He did not believe that Dobrovský could have accomplished this, as his views on Slavic grammar (as expressed in his magnum opus, Institutiones) were strikingly different from the system written in Igor's Tale. In his revised second edition issued in 2007, Zaliznyak was able to use evidence from the posthumous edition of Zimin's 2006 book. He argued that even someone striving to imitate some older texts would have had almost impossible hurdles to overcome, as mere imitation could not have represented the deep mechanics of the language.

Juri Lotman supports the text's authenticity, based on the absence of a number of semiotic elements in the Russian Classicist literary tradition before the publication of the Tale. He notes that "Russian Land" (русская земля) was a term that became popular only in the 19th century. A presumed forger of the 1780s–1790s would not have used such a term while composing the text.

== Orality ==
Robert Mann (1989, 2005) argues that the leading studies have been mistaken in concluding the Tale is the work of a poet working in a written tradition. Mann points to evidence suggesting that the Tale first circulated as an oral epic song for several decades before being written down, most likely in the early 13th century. He identifies the opening lines as corresponding to such an oral tradition: "Was it not fitting, brothers, to begin with the olden words of the heroic tales about the campaign of Igor..." The narrator begins by referring to oral epic tales that are already old and familiar. Mann has found numerous new parallels to the text of the Tale in wedding songs, magical incantations, byliny and other Old Russian sources. He was the first researcher to point out unique textual parallels in a rare version of the Tale of the Battle against Mamai (Skazanie o Mamaevom poboishche), published by N.G. Golovin in 1835. It contains what Mann claims is the earliest known redaction of the Skazanie, a redaction that scholars posited but could not locate.

Based on byliny and Old Russian sources, Mann has attempted to reconstruct an early Russian song about the conversion of the Kievan State. Mann believes that this early conversion cycle left its imprint on several passages of the Tale, including the motif sequence in which the pagan mythical creature Div warns the Tmutorokan idol that Igor's army is approaching. This Div is typically construed to be an ominous bird.

== Editions and translations ==
- Aleksei Musin-Pushkin, Alexei Malinovsky and Nikolai Bantysh-Kamensky, Ироическая пѣснь о походѣ на половцовъ удѣльнаго князя Новагорода-Сѣверскаго Игоря Святославича, писанная стариннымъ русскимъ языкомъ въ исходѣ XII столѣтія съ переложеніемъ на употребляемое нынѣ нарѣчіе. Moscow, in senatorial typography. (1800)
- Mansvetus Riedl, Szozat Igor hadjaratarul a paloczok ellen (1858)
- The Tale of the Armament of Igor. A.D. 1185. A Russian Historical Epic. Translated by Leonard A. Magnus. London: Oxford University Press. 1915.
- The Tale of Igor. Translated by Helen de Vere Beauclerk. Illustrations by Michel Sevier. London: Beaumont. 1918.
- Eduard Sievers, Das Igorlied (1926)
- Karl Heinrich Meyer, Das Igorlied (1933)
- Henri Grégoire, Roman Jakobson, Marc Szeftel, J. A. Joffe, La Geste du prince Igor, Annuaire de l'Institut de philologie et ď histoire orientales et slaves, t. VIII. (1948)
- Dmitry Likhachev, Слово о полку Игореве, Литературные памятники (1950)
- Vladimir Nabokov, The Song of Igor's Campaign: An Epic of the 12th Century (1960)
- Dimitri Obolensky, The Lay of Igor's Campaign — of Igor the Son of Svyatoslav and the Grandson of Oleg (translation alongside original text), in The Penguin Book of Russian Verse (1962)
- Robert Howes, The Tale of the Campaign of Igor (1973)
- Serge Zenkovsky, "The Lay of Igor's Campaign", in Medieval Russia's Epics, Chronicles, and Tales (Revised edition, 1974)
- Dmitry Likhachev, Слово о полку Игореве, (Old Russian into English by Irina Petrova), (illustrated by Vladimir Favorsky), "The Lay of the Warfare Waged by Igor", Progress Publishers (Moscow, revised edition, 1981)
- J. A. V. Haney and Eric Dahl, The Discourse on Igor's Campaign: A Translation of the Slovo o polku Igoreve. (1989)
- J. A. V. Haney and Eric Dahl, On the Campaign of Igor: A Translation of the Slovo o polku Igoreve. (1992)
- Mann, Robert (2005). The Igor Tales and Their Folkloric Background. Jupiter, FL: The Birchbark Press of Karacharovo.

== See also ==
- Prince Igor (1969 film)
- Solar eclipse of 1 May 1185
- Musin-Pushkin House (Saint Petersburg)
