= Svyatoslav III Igorevich =

Sviatoslav III Igorevich
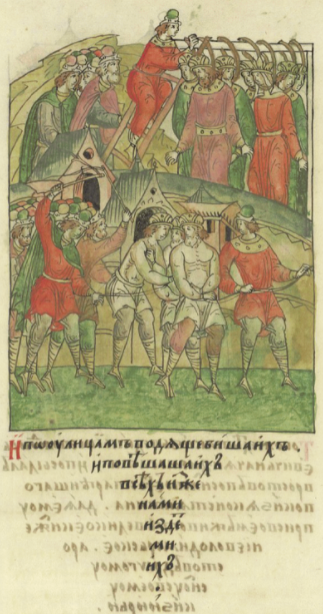
- The murder of the Igorevichs,miniature from the Illustrated Chronicle of Ivan the Terrible (16th century)
- Born: 1176
- Died: September 1211 (aged 34–35)
- Noble family: Olgovichi
- Spouse: Yaroslava Rurikovna
- Father: Igor Svyatoslavich
- Mother: Euphrosyne Yaroslavna

Sviatoslav III Igorevich (1176 – September 1211) was an Olgovichi prince. In October, 1188 he married Yaroslava Rurikovna, a daughter of prince Rurik Rostislavich of Belgorod by his wife Anna Yurevna of Turov.

- Agafia of Rus (after 1188 - after 31 August 1247), wife of Konrad I of Masovia.

== Ancestors ==
Ancestors of Svyatoslav III Igorevich

16. Svyatoslav II Yaroslavich, Grand Prince of Kiev
8. Oleg Svyatoslavich, Prince of Chernigov
17. Kilikia of Dithmarschen
4. Svyatoslav Olgovich, prince of Chernigov
18. Ossolur, Cuman khan
9. Unnamed
2. Igor Svyatoslavich, Prince of Chernigov
10. Petrilla, posadnik of Novgorod
5. Catherine
1. Svyatoslav III Igorevich
24. Volodar Rostislavich, Prince of Halych
12. Volodimirko Volodarovich, Prince of Halych
25. Anna of Pomerania
6. Yaroslav Volodimerovich, Prince of Halych
26. Coloman, King of Hungary
13. Unnamed
3. Euphrosyne Yaroslavna
28. Vladimir II Vsevolodovich, Grand Prince of Kiev
14. Yuri Vladimirovich, Grand Prince of Kiev
29. Unnamed
7. Olga Yurevna
30. Khan Aepo of the Cumans
15. Unnamed

== Sources ==
- Benda, Kálmán (General Editor): Magyarország történeti kronológiája - I. kötet: A kezdetektől 1526-ig /A Historical Chronology of Hungary - Volume I: From the Beginnings to 1526/; Akadémiai Kiadó, 1981, Budapest; ISBN 963-05-2661-1 (the part of the book which describes the events of the period from 1197 to 1309 was written by László Solymosi).
- Dimnik, Martin: The Dynasty of Chernigov - 1146-1246; Cambridge University Press, 2003, Cambridge; ISBN 978-0-521-03981-9.

Svyatoslav III Igorevich Olgovichi Born: 1176 Died: September 1211
Preceded by (part of the Principality of Halych)	Prince of Peremyshl; 1206	Succeeded by (part of the Principality of Halych)
Preceded by Daniil Romanovich	Prince of Volodymyr-Volynskyi; 1206	Succeeded by Aleksandr Vsevolodovich
Preceded by (part of the Principality of Halych)	Prince of Peremyshl; 1208–1209	Succeeded by (part of the Principality of Halych)
Preceded by (part of the Principality of Halych)	Prince of Peremyshl; 1210–1211	Succeeded by (part of the Principality of Halych)
