= List of battles of the Mongol invasion of Kievan Rus' =

The following is a list of battles of the Mongol invasion of Kievan Rus' (1223, 1237–1241).

Results

Mongol victory
Rus' victory
Inconclusive/Other result

== Summary ==
Year	Location	Conflict	Mongol forces	Rus' principalities and allies	Result	Notes
May 1223	Oleshia, Kievan Rus'	Battle of Oleshia	Mongol Empire	Galicia–Volhynia; Chernigov	Rus' victory	
31 May 1223	Kalka River	Battle of the Kalka River	Mongol Empire	Kiev; Galicia–Volhynia; Chernigov; Smolensk; Cumans	Mongol victory	
December 1237	Voronezh (river)	Battle of Voronezh River	Mongol Empire	Ryazan	Mongol victory	
16–21 December 1237	Staraya Ryazan (Old Ryazan), near Spassk-Ryazansky	Siege of Ryazan	Mongol Empire	Ryazan	Mongol victory	
December 1237 – January 1238	Kolomna	Siege of Kolomna	Mongol Empire	Vladimir–Suzdal	Mongol victory	
15–20 January 1238	Moscow	Siege of Moscow (1238)	Mongol Empire	Vladimir–Suzdal	Mongol victory	
3–8 February 1238	Vladimir	Siege of Vladimir	Mongol Empire	Vladimir–Suzdal	Mongol victory	
4 March 1238	Sit River (modern-day Yaroslavl Oblast, Russia)	Battle of the Sit River	Mongol Empire	Vladimir–Suzdal	Mongol victory	
March – May 1238	Kozelsk	Siege of Kozelsk	Mongol Empire	Chernigov	Mongol victory	
1239–1240	Ruthenia	Batu's raid of 1240 in Ruthenia	Mongol Empire	Galicia–Volhynia; Chernigov; Pereyaslav	Mongol victory	1238–1239: Rostov, Uglich, Yaroslavl, Kostroma, Kashin, Ksnyatin, Gorodets, Galich, Pereslavl, Yuriev, Dmitrov, Volok, Tver and Torzhok were devastated. In the west, Chernigov and Pereyaslav were sacked.
18 October 1239	Chernihiv	Sack of Chernigov	Mongol Empire	Chernigov	Mongol victory	
28 November – 6 December 1240	Kyiv	Siege of Kiev (1240)	Mongol Empire	Galicia–Volhynia	Mongol victory	
1241	Kremenets (modern-day Ternopil Oblast, Ukraine)	Siege of Kremenets	Mongol Empire	Galicia–Volhynia	Rus' victory	
1241	Danilov (modern-day Ternopil Oblast, Ukraine)	Siege of Danilov	Mongol Empire	Galicia–Volhynia	Rus' victory	
1241	Kholm (modern-day Lublin Voivodeship, Poland)	Siege of Kholm	Mongol Empire	Galicia–Volhynia	Rus' victory	

== See also ==
- Timeline of the Golden Horde – including battles involving the Golden Horde in Europe
  - List of wars and battles involving the Golden Horde (1242–1502)
- Mongol Empire
- Mongol invasion of Europe
- Mongol invasion of Circassia
- Mongol invasions of Durdzuketia
- Mongol invasion of Hungary
- Mongol invasion of Kievan Rus'
- Mongol invasions of Lithuania
- Mongol invasion of Poland
- Mongol invasion of Volga Bulgaria

== Bibliography ==
- Halperin, Charles J. (1987). Russia and the Golden Horde: The Mongol Impact on Medieval Russian History. p. 222. ISBN 9781850430575. (e-book).
- Shaikhutdinov, Marat (23 November 2021). "3.4 Invasion of Tokhtamysh". Between East and West: The Formation of the Moscow State. Academic Studies Press. pp. 104–107. ISBN 978-1-64469-715-3.
