= 1239 =

1239 in various calendars
- Gregorian calendar: 1239; MCCXXXIX
- Ab urbe condita: 1992
- Armenian calendar: 688; ԹՎ ՈՁԸ
- Assyrian calendar: 5989
- Balinese saka calendar: 1160–1161
- Bengali calendar: 645–646
- Berber calendar: 2189
- English Regnal year: 23 Hen. 3 – 24 Hen. 3
- Buddhist calendar: 1783
- Burmese calendar: 601
- Byzantine calendar: 6747–6748
- Chinese calendar: 戊戌年 (Earth Dog); 3936 or 3729 — to — 己亥年 (Earth Pig); 3937 or 3730
- Coptic calendar: 955–956
- Discordian calendar: 2405
- Ethiopian calendar: 1231–1232
- Hebrew calendar: 4999–5000
- Hindu calendars
- Vikram Samvat: 1295–1296
- Shaka Samvat: 1160–1161
- Kali Yuga: 4339–4340
- Holocene calendar: 11239
- Igbo calendar: 239–240
- Iranian calendar: 617–618
- Islamic calendar: 636–637
- Japanese calendar: Ryakunin 2 / En'ō 1 (延応元年)
- Javanese calendar: 1148–1149
- Julian calendar: 1239; MCCXXXIX
- Korean calendar: 3572
- Minguo calendar: 673 before ROC 民前673年
- Nanakshahi calendar: −229
- Thai solar calendar: 1781–1782
- Tibetan calendar: ས་ཕོ་ཁྱི་ལོ་ (male Earth-Dog); 1365 or 984 or 212 — to — ས་མོ་ཕག་ལོ་ (female Earth-Boar); 1366 or 985 or 213

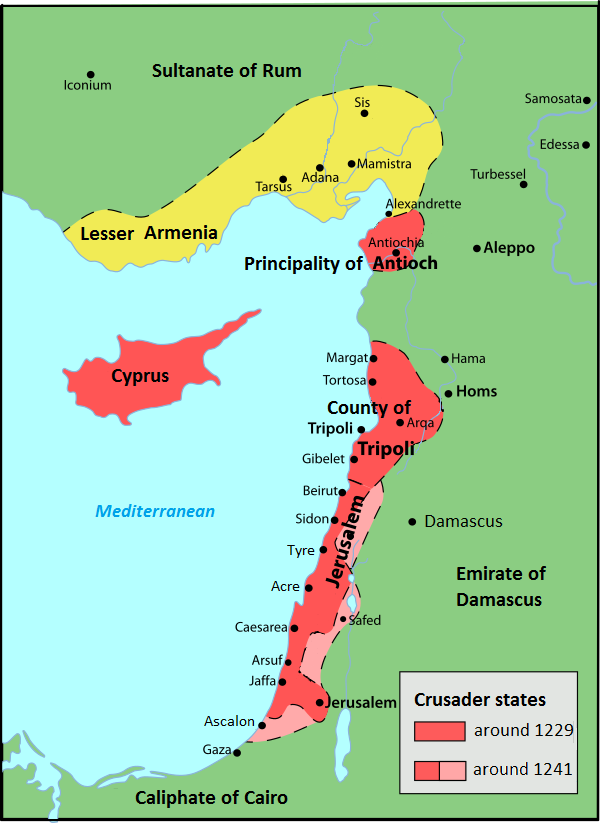
The Crusader states around 1240–41

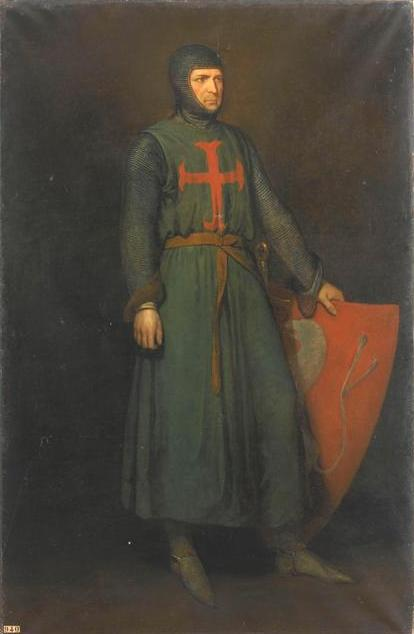
Amaury VI de Montfort (1192–1241)

Year 1239 (MCCXXXIX) was a common year starting on Saturday of the Julian calendar.

== Events ==
=== By place ===
==== Europe ====
- Summer – A German expeditionary force under Frederick II, Holy Roman Emperor, invades the Romagna and Tuscany, hoping to capture Rome. He appoints his 21-year-old son, Enzo of Sardinia, as imperial vicar general for Northern Italy. Frederick also threatens with war against Venice, which has sent ships to blockade the harbors on Sicily. In order to finance his growing need for arms, he institutes an administrative reorganization of the Holy Roman Empire (among others, the formation of 10 vice regencies in Italy).
- Autumn – King Béla IV of Hungary allows some 40,000 Cumans, pagan nomads fleeing the Mongols, to settle in Hungary between the rivers Danube and Theiss, after their leader, Köten, has promised to convert to Christianity.
- November – Pope Gregory IX grants the status of Crusade to King Ferdinand III of Castile ("the Saint"), who leads a successful campaign against the Almohads in Murcia.
- King Louis IX of France ("the Saint") holds a parlement (or "court of law") at Paris, for the first time recorded in Ancien Régime France.

==== England ====
- June 17 or June 18 – Edward I ("Longshanks"), first son of King Henry III of England and Queen Eleanor of Provence, is born at the Palace of Westminster. Henry names him after Edward the Confessor and chooses Simon de Montfort as his godfather.

==== Levant ====
- September 1 – Barons' Crusade: A Crusader force (some 1,500 knights) under King Theobald I of Navarre arrives at Acre. At a council of local barons – most prominently Walter IV of Brienne, Odo of Montbéliard, Balian of Beirut, John of Arsuf, and Balian of Sidon – plans are made to prepare an expedition against the Ayyubids in Egypt. Later, Theobald is joined by some Crusaders from Cyprus.
- November 2 – An expeditionary force (some 4,000 knights) under Theobald I sets out from Acre for the Egyptian frontier, detachments from the military orders and several local barons accompany the Crusaders. While marching to Jaffa, a Crusader column led by Peter of Brittany and his lieutenant Raoul de Soissons with two hundred knights, lay an ambush and attacks a rich Muslim caravan.
- November 12 – Sultan as-Salih Ayyub sends an Ayyubid army to Gaza to protect the Egyptian border. At nightfall, Henry of Bar, jealous of the successful ambush of Peter of Brittany, decides to march out towards Gaza with a Crusader force (some 500 knights and 1,000 soldiers). Although warned by Theobald I, Henry sets up camp in a flat terrain surrounded by sand dunes near Gaza.
- November 13 – Battle of Gaza: The Crusader army led by Henry of Bar is defeated by the Egyptians near Gaza. More than a thousand men are slaughtered, including Henry himself. Six hundred more are captured and carried off to Egypt. Among them are Amaury VI de Montfort and Philippe de Nanteuil – who, in the dungeons of Cairo, writes a Crusade song about the failure of the expedition.
- December 7 – Ayyubid forces under An-Nasir Dawud march on Jerusalem, which is largely undefended. The garrison of the city surrenders to Dawud, after accepting his offer for a safe-conduct to Acre. Dawud destroys Jerusalem's fortifications, including the Tower of David. Meanwhile, Theobald I (losing many men underway) moves with the remnants of the Crusader army northward to Acre.

==== Mongol Empire ====
- The Mongol invasion of Kievan Rus': The Mongols under Batu Khan continue their campaign across the Pontic Steppe. After devastating the Crimea and campaigning against the Circassians in the Caucasus, they turn towards the Kievan Rus'. In March, Pereyaslavl, capital of the Principality of Pereyaslavl, is sacked by the Mongols.
- October 18 – Sack of Chernigov: The Mongols led by Batu Khan attack Chernigov; the garrison rallies outside the walls to face the Mongols in a pitched battle. Prince Mstislav III Glebovich comes to help with his troops but they are slaughtered by Mongol catapults. The city is pillaged as are the towns in the surrounding countryside.

=== By topic ===
==== Religion ====
- March 20 – Gregory IX renews the excommunication of Frederick II, Holy Roman Emperor, while he is at his court in Padua. Frederick responds by expelling the Franciscans and Dominicans from Lombardy.

== Births ==
- June 3 or June 4 – John II, Duke of Brittany, French nobleman and knight (d. 1305)
- June 17 or June 18 – Edward I ("Longshanks"), king of England (d. 1307)
- December 17 – Kujō Yoritsugu, Japanese ruler (shogun) (d. 1256)
- Álvaro, Count of Urgell ("the Castilian"), Spanish nobleman and knight (d. 1268)
- Balian of Arsuf, Cypriot nobleman (House of Ibelin) (d. 1277)
- Constance of Aragon, Spanish princess (infanta) (d. 1269)
- Peter III, king of Aragon and Valencia (d. 1285)
- Robert de Ferrers, English nobleman and knight (d. 1279)
- Stephen V, king of Hungary (House of Árpád) (d. 1272)
- Thomas I of Saluzzo, Italian nobleman and knight (d. 1296)

== Deaths ==
- February 3 – Kujō Ninshi, Japanese empress consort (b. 1173)
- February – Aimery III of Narbonne (or Aimeric), French nobleman
- March 3 – Vladimir IV of Kiev, Kievan Grand Prince (b. 1187)
- March 20 – Hermann von Salza, German Grand Master (b. 1165)
- March 28 – Go-Toba (Toba II), emperor of Japan (b. 1180)
- April 7 – William I de Cantilupe, Norman nobleman (b. 1159)
- June 5 – Władysław Odonic ("the Spitter"), Polish nobleman
- August – Thomas of Capua, Italian prelate, cardinal and diplomat
- September 21 – Simon of Dammartin, French nobleman
- November 1 – Robert of Esztergom, Hungarian prelate
- November 13 – Henry II of Bar, French nobleman (b. 1190)
- December 13 – Albert IV, Count of Habsburg ("the Wise"), German nobleman
- December 21
  - Henry de Turberville, English nobleman and knight
  - Richard Wilton, English scholastic philosopher
- Abu al-Abbas al-Nabati, Andalusian pharmacist (b. 1166)
- Ibn al-Khabbaza, Moroccan historian, poet and writer
- Ibn al-Mustawfi, Ayyubid governor and historian (b. 1169)
- Muhammad bin Hasan al-Baghdadi, Arab cuisine writer
- Robert, Lord of Champignelles (de Courtenay), French nobleman, knight and Crusader (b. 1168)
