= Batu's raid of 1240 in Ruthenia =

1239 military campaign

Batu's raid of Ruthenia
- Part of the Mongol invasion of Kievan Rus'
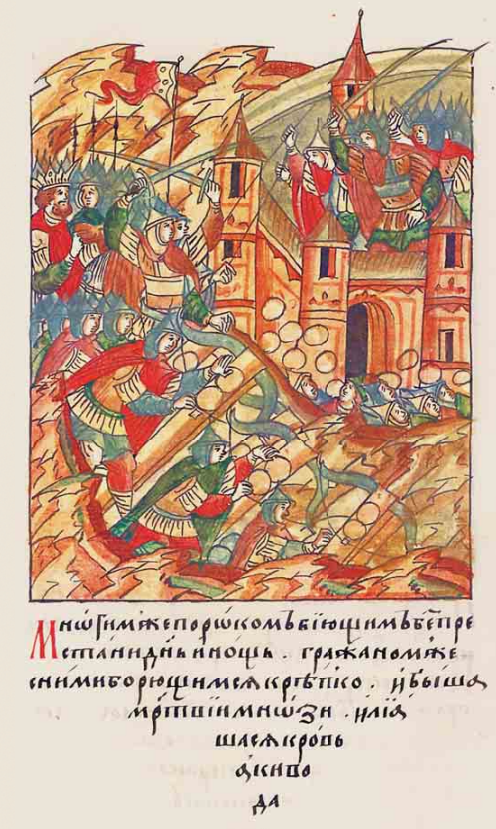
- Siege of Kiev in 1240
Date	Spring of 1239 – Autumn of 1240
Location	Modern Ukraine
Result	Mongol victory

Belligerents
Mongol Empire	Principality of Chernigov; Principality of Pereyaslav; Principality of Galicia-Volhynia

Commanders and leaders
Batu Khan	Michael of Kiev; Mstislav III Glebovich; Daniel of Galicia

Strength
Several tumen of nomad cavalry	Several thousand, but scattered in garrisons

Casualties and losses
Light	Heavy

In 1240, Batu Khan led a raid into Ruthenia as part of the Mongol invasion of Kievan Rus'. It took place three years after Batu's 1237 conquests of Volga Bulgaria and the Principality of Vladimir-Suzdal.

== Events ==
According to the Hypatian Codex, at the end of 1238 Batu Khan retreated to the Cuman land (presumably the Donbas area), while sending his troops to Pereyaslav and Chernihiv. During the raid on Pereyaslav on March 3, 1239, the local church of St. Michael was destroyed and plundered, while its bishop, Simeon, was killed. None of the earlier period architecture survived. When Mstislav Glebovich heard that Batu Khan's troops besieged Chernihiv he attacked them near the city walls. Mstislav's army was destroyed, but he managed to flee. On October 18, 1239 Chernihiv was taken and burnt down. Chernihiv's Bishop Porfyriy was spared, but relocated to Hlukhiv.

While scouting in the vicinity of Kiev in the fall of 1239, Möngke Khan (Mengu Khan) reached Horodok Pisochny, located on the left bank of Dnieper across Kiev. Today it is part of Kiev city, in the Troieschyna neighborhood. Mengu-Khan sent his envoys to Michael and the city residents, but no one listened to them. Soon after, Michael fled Kiev to Hungary and his throne in Kiev was temporarily taken over by Rostislav from Smolensk. However sometime during the winter Daniel of Galicia attacked Rostislav and replaced him with his voivode (tysyatsky) Dmytro. Also in Kamianets, Yaroslav of Medzhybozh took hostage the Grand Prince of Kiev's consort and sister of Daniel Olena Romanivna as well as several boyars of Michael. Daniel managed to convince Yaroslav to release his sister, who returned to live with Daniel and Vasylko.

In the summer of 1240, after unsuccessful negotiations with the King of Hungary (Béla IV) and the High Duke of Poland (Konrad I), Michael negotiated peace with Daniel and Vasylko who accepted his offer. Daniel promised to return Kiev to Michael, while giving his son Rostislav the city of Lutsk. However Michael refused to accept the princely seat in Kiev and until the fall of Kiev stayed in Chełm, the capital of the Ruthenian Kingdom. After the fall of Kiev and the further advance of Mongols, Michael and his son ran to Konrad, but later Michael tried to move to Silesia. On April 9, 1241 after he was robbed and his granddaughter was killed in Środa Śląska, Michael returned to Konrad in Mazovia.

=== Raids in Volhynia and Galicia ===
At the end of the fall, Batu's troops besieged and captured Kiev. The best-known account of Batu's subsequent raids in Volhynia and Galicia comes from the Galician–Volhynian Chronicle.

At that time Danilo had gone to Hungary to the king and had not heard yet of the attack of the heathen Tatars on Kiev. When Batyj took Kiev, he heard that Danilo was in Hungary and set out in person toward Volodimer'. He came to the city of Kolodjažen and set up twelve catapults, but could not make a breach in the walls. He began persuading the people [to surrender]. They listened to his evil advice, surrendered and were slaughtered [by the Tatars. Then Batyj] came to Kamenec and Izjaslavl' and took them [also]. Then he saw that he could not take Kremenec and the city of Danilov he left them, came to Volodimer' and took it by storm. He slaughtered its inhabitants without mercy as well as the inhabitants of Halyč and of many other cities whose number cannot be determined.

— translated by George Perfecky (1973), Galician–Volhynian Chronicle

From this passage, it is generally understood that Daniel stayed in Hungary conducting negotiations while the siege of Kiev was in progress. Batu Khan moved towards Volodymyr. On his way Batu unsuccessfully tried to take the fortress of Kolodyazhyn, near the Sluch River. However, after some negotiations, the city residents were tricked into surrendering and then were slain. Batu Khan continued to Kamianets upon Sluch and Iziaslavl', taking both cities. After that Batu sacked many other cities including the capital cities Volodymyr and Halych. The only cities which reportedly survived were Kremenets, Chełm (Kholm), and Danyliv.

== Archaeology ==
Of the mentioned cities of Kolodyazhyn, Kamenets (or Kamianets), Izyaslavl', Kremenets and Danilov (or Danylov), only Kolodyazhyn has been definitively identified with a fortified settlement unearthed by archaeologists near the modern village of Kolodyazhne (Zhytomyr Raion) on the river Sluch. Izyaslavl' is most probably to be identified with the modern city of Iziaslav or Zaslav on the river Horyn in Khmelnytskyi Oblast. The most complicated question is where to situate the chronicled Volhynian city of "Kamenets". Mykhailo Hrushevsky (1891) suggested near the village of Kamianka (close to the city of Shepetivka), which lies at the confluence of the Tsvitokha (an eastern tributary of the Horyn) and the Huska (a tributary of the Tsvitokha), although no sites have been found near Kamianka. However, further south in the upper reaches of the Huska, a team of archaeologists led by Mikhail Karger in 1957–1964 excavated a fortified settlement of 3.6 hectares near the modern village of Horodyshche (Shepetivka Raion). This might have been the city of Kamenets mentioned in the Rus' chronicles, which describe it as a fortified centre on the border between the principalities of Kiev and Volhynia.

The Hypatian Codex text of the Galician–Volhynian Chronicle (GVC) mentions that in the year 6770 (1262), the Lithuanian grand duke Mindaugas sent an army to "ravage the area around the city of Каменца" (Kamentsa, meaning "around Kamenets"), whereas the Khlebnikov Codex copy calls this city Камена (Kamena). Leonid Makhnovets (1989) pointed out that the Hypatian text must be mistaken, because "the town of Kamenets on the river Sluch was destroyed in 1240 by Batu". There have also been attempts to identify the city of Kamenets reportly destroyed by Batu in 1240 with modern Kamianets-Podilskyi. However, that is located in Podolia, about 170 kilometres further south than the cluster of sites studied by scholars (in northern Khmelnytskyi Oblast and Zhytomyr Raion). Moreover, the Tale of Podolia explicitly claims that there were no cities in Podolia until the 1350s and 1360s, when the sons of Karijotas from the Principality of Navahrudak reportedly established the city of "Kamenets" (Каменець), near "the city of Bakota" (город Бакоту) "on the Smotryty" (на Смотрити, generally understood as the river Smotrych, which flows through the city of Kamianets-Podilskyi today): "...they built the city of Kamenets, and from that all the cities of Podolia were built". This suggests a different site for a newly established city rather than the same site of a city that had previously been destroyed.

== Bibliography ==
Primary sources

- Perfecky, George A. (1973). The Hypatian Codex Part Two: The Galician–Volynian Chronicle. An annotated translation by George A. Perfecky. München: Wilhelm Fink Verlag. OCLC 902306.

Literature

- Peskova, Anna; Mikhaylov, Kirill (2018). "The Large Fortified Settlement Near Shepetivka: History of the Medieval Settlement – History of the Archaeological Site". Analecta Archaeologica Ressoviensia. 13: 417–440. doi:10.15584/anarres.2018.13.20.
