= Sack of Chernigov =

Siege in 1239 in Kievan Rus

- Part of the Mongol invasion of Kievan Rus'
Date	18 October 1239
Location	Chernigov
Result	Mongol victory

Belligerents
Mongol Empire	Principality of Chernigov

Commanders and leaders
Batu Khan	Mstislav III Glebovich

Casualties and losses
Light	Heavy

The Mongol siege, capture, and sack of Chernigov, the capital of the Chernigov Principality, occurred on October 18, 1239, during the westward expansion of the Mongol Empire. It was part of the 1237–1242 Mongol invasion of Kievan Rus'.

== Location and demographics ==
The Principality of Chernigov was one of the largest and most powerful principalities within the Kievan Rus'. The greater part of the principality was situated on the eastern bank of the Dnieper River, encompassing the basins of the Desna and Seym rivers. The populace of the principality consisted mainly of Slavic tribes, namely the Siverians and Dnieper Polans. Over time, the territory of the principality expanded to encompass the lands of the Radimichs, as well as a portion of the lands belonging to the Vyatichs and Drehovichs. The Chernigov Principality was bordered by the Murom-Ryazan Land to the north and the Tmutorokan Principality to the southeast, and it exerted influence on both.

Chernigov was the capital of the principality. Other notable urban centers included Novgorod-Seversky, Starodub-Seversky, Trubchevsk, and Kozelsk. Chernigov's population was estimated at between 25,000 and 30,000 when it was sacked. This made it a major city in a time when Kiev, the capitol of the Kievan Rus', had a population of 50,000.

== Prelude ==
The Mongol invasion of Kievan Rus' occurred in two phases. During the winter of 1237–38, the Mongol army under Batu Khan conquered the northern Rus' territories (the principalities of Ryazan and Vladimir-Suzdal) with the exception of the Novgorod Republic. In the following spring of 1238, the Mongol Army returned to the Wild Fields. In 1239, the second campaign was aimed at the southern Rus' territories (the principalities of Chernigov and Kiev).

== Battle ==
In the autumn of 1239, the Mongols captured Hlukhiv, Kursk, Rylsk, and Putivl and advanced towards Chernigov. When Prince Mstislav heard that the Mongols were attacking the town, he moved with his troops to confront them. The Mongols used catapults that hurled stones the distance of a bowshot and a half. Mstislav escaped, but many of his men were killed.

== Aftermath ==
Following the fall of Chernigov on October 18, 1239, the Tatars pillaged towns in the surrounding countryside. Mstislav fled to Kiev and negotiated his surrender to Batu Khan, although the terms are unclear. The capital city of Kiev fell in the autumn of 1240. Both the Kievan Rus and the Principality of Chernigov were dissolved after the Mongol invasion, and the city of Chernigov entered a long period of relative obscurity.
