= Elena Romanovna =

Russian princess

Elena Romanovna (died 1243) was a Grand Princess of the Kiev by marriage (m. 1210 or 1211) to Michael of Chernigov, Grand Prince of Kiev (r. 1236–1240, 1240, 1241–1243).

Elena Romanovna (or Maria Romanovna) was a daughter of prince Roman Mstislavich of Halych and his wife, Predslava Rurikovna of Kiev

== Issue ==
The existence of the last four children in the list below is disputed.

1. Feodula Mikhailovna (1212 – 1250); became a nun and adopted the religious name Evfrosinia;
2. Duke Rostislav Mikhailovich of Macsó (b. c. 1225 – 1262);
3. Maria Mikhailovna (? – 7 or 9 December 1271), wife of Prince Vasilko Konstantinovich of Rostov;
4. Prince Roman Mikhailovich of Chernigov and Bryansk (c. 1218 – after 1288/1305);
5. Prince Mstislav Mikhailovich of Karachev and Zvenigorod (1220 – 1280);
6. Prince Simeon Mikhailovich of Hlukhiv and Novosil;
7. Prince Yury Mikhailovich of Torusa and Bryansk.
