= Siege of Kiev (1240) =

Mongol siege of a Rus' city

- Part of Mongol invasion of Kievan Rus'
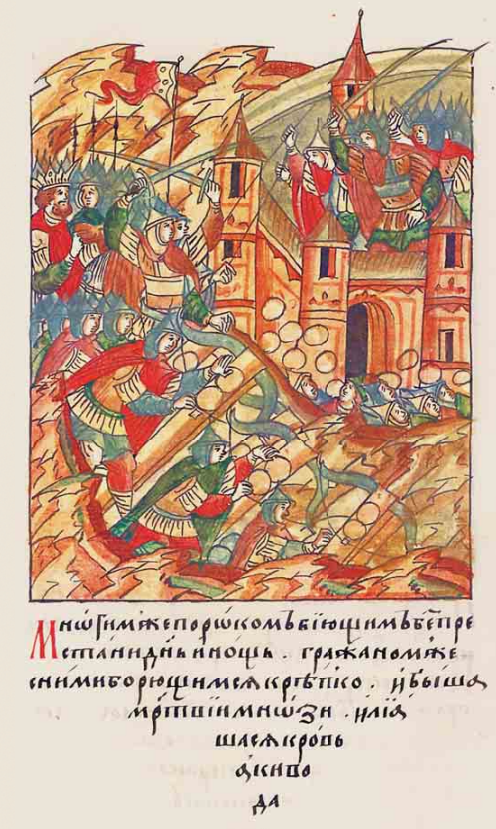
- Imaginative portrayal of the 1240 siege of Kiev in the 16th-century Facial Chronicle.
Date	28 November – 6 December 1240
Location	Kiev 50°27′00″N 30°31′25″E
Result	Mongol victory
Territorial changes	Kiev plundered; Most civilians slaughtered

Belligerents
Mongol Empire	Galicia–Volhynia

Commanders and leaders
Batu Khan	Voivode Dmitr (surrendered)

Strength
Unknown; probably large	~1,000

Casualties and losses
Unknown, probably minor	~48,000 (including noncombatants) killed
- Location within Europe

The Siege of Kiev by the Mongols took place between 28 November and 6 December 1240, and resulted in a Mongol victory. It was a heavy morale and military blow to the Principality of Galicia–Volhynia, which was forced to submit to Mongol suzerainty, and allowed Batu Khan to proceed westward into Central Europe.

== Background ==
Batu Khan and the Mongols began their invasion in late 1237 by conquering the northeastern Rus' Principality of Ryazan. Then, in 1238 the Mongols went south-west and destroyed the cities of Vladimir and Kozelsk. In 1239, they captured both Pereyaslav and Chernigov with their sights set on Kiev.

The Mongol envoys sent to Kiev to demand submission were executed by Grand Prince Michael of Chernigov. The Mongol capture of Chernigov caused Michael to flee to Hungary in 1239 or 1240. The Smolensk prince Rostislav II Mstislavich seized the opportunity to claim Kiev for himself, but was in turn soon driven out by Daniel of Galicia-Volhynia (Danylo Romanovych).

The next year, Batu Khan's army under the tactical command of the great Mongol general Subutai reached Kiev (in November 1240). At the time, the city was ruled by the Principality of Galicia–Volhynia (Halych-Volhynia, also known as Ruthenia), having been recently captured by Danylo Romanovych. The chief commander in Kiev was Voivode Dmytro, while Danylo was in Hungary at that time, seeking a military union to prevent invasion.

== Siege ==
The vanguard army under Batu's cousin Möngke came near the city. Möngke was apparently taken by the splendor of Kiev and offered the city terms for surrender, but his envoys were killed. The Mongols chose to assault the city. Batu Khan destroyed the forces of the Rus vassals, the Chorni Klobuky, who were on their way to relieve Kiev, and the entire Mongol army camped outside the city gates, joining Möngke's troops.

Scholar Alexander Maiorov (2016) compared all the dates in the surviving records of the events, concluding that the siege of Kiev lasted just nine days, from 28 November to 6 December 1240. On 28 November, the Mongols set up catapults near one of the three gates of old Kiev where tree cover extended almost to the city walls. The Mongols then began a bombardment that lasted several days. On 6 December, Kiev's walls were breached, and hand-to-hand combat followed in the streets. The Kievans suffered heavy losses and Dmytro was wounded by an arrow.

When night fell, the Mongols held their positions while the Kievans retreated to the central parts of the city. Many people crowded into the Church of the Tithes. The next day, as the Mongols commenced the final assault, the church's balcony collapsed under the weight of the people standing on it, crushing many. After the Mongols won the battle, they plundered Kiev. Most of the population was massacred. Out of 50,000 inhabitants before the invasion, about 2,000 survived. Most of the city was burned and only six out of forty major buildings remained standing. Dmytro, however, was shown mercy for his bravery.

== Aftermath ==
After their victory at Kiev, the Mongols forced both Galicia and Volhynia to submit to Batu Khan's suzerainty, and they were free to advance westward into Hungary and Poland. The Mongol advance westward only halted in September 1242, when Batu Khan heard the news that Ögedei Khan had died, and Batu needed to attend the quriltai where a successor would be chosen. Soon after, the new Mongol regime began collecting tributes through a Darughachi in Kiev and elsewhere, as Fra Giovanni da Pian del Carpine already observed in the 1240s.

Former Kievan grand prince Michael of Chernigov had been unsuccessfully seeking assistance in Hungary, Poland, and Galicia during his exile since 1239 or 1240. But by 1243 he had accepted the fact that the Mongols had recognised Yaroslav II of Vladimir as the new grand prince, and Michael returned to Chernigov. All the major reigning Rus' princes eventually made the journey to Sarai, the capital city of Batu Khan's newly established Golden Horde state. Daniel of Galicia and Michael of Chernigov were the last two to make their trip and formally submit to the khan as their overlord, and be confirmed in their principalities. However, Michael refused to "purify himself by walking between two fires and to kowtow before an idol of Chingis Khan"; this offence reportedly angered Batu, who had him executed in September 1246.

== Surviving records on the events ==
=== Native records ===
Although the 1240 siege of Kiev has been described in nearly every Rus' chronicle written after the events, they vary widely in the details, contradict each other and have conflicting dates as to when it happened exactly. They include:

- The Galician–Volhynian Chronicle (GVC, as transmitted in the Hypatian Codex, Khlebnikov Codex, and other manuscripts). This account 'gives the fullest and the most detailed description of the siege and the capture of Kiev'. According to the GVC (written in Old Ruthenian, completed in the 1290s), the defenders of Kiev managed to capture a Mongol soldier named Tovrul', who provided them with the names of all enemy officers, suggesting that they acquired extensive knowledge of the army they were facing.
- The Novgorod First Chronicle (NPL, as transmitted in both the Older and Younger Redactions).
- The Laurentian Rostov continuation of the Suzdalian Chronicle (as transmitted in the Laurentian Codex).
- The Moscow Academic Rostov continuation of the Suzdalian Chronicle (as transmitted in the Academic Chronicle).
- The Chronicler from Vladimir (Vladimirskii letopisets').
- The Pskov Chronicles, Avraamka's Chronicle (from Western Rus'), and Bolshakov Chronicle (from Novgorod). According to the account in the Pskov Chronicles, written two centuries after the fact, the Mongol siege engines took ten weeks to break through Kiev's two sets of fortifications. Maiorov (2016) concluded that this version of events 'is entirely fictitious', made up in order 'to reconstruct the history of the struggle against the Tatars at a time when the Golden Horde had lost its political importance.'

Contrary to earlier scholarly belief, the Supraśl Chronicle mentions the siege, but does not contain an account of a 10-week-long 1240 siege of Kiev.

=== Foreign records ===
- The Jami' al-tawarikh, written by Rashid al-Din Hamadani in Arabic and Persian just after 1300, contains a brief passage on "Prince Batu"'s capture of Manker Kan, the old Turkic name for Kiev.
- A letter by a Hungarian bishop written between 1239 and 1242 provides indirect, circumstantial evidence of when the Mongols invaded, and that they probably waited until mid-November 1240 for the river Dnieper to freeze over in order to cross it with their heavy baggage carts, moving yurts and siege weapons.
- The Ystoria Mongalorum, written by Italian diplomat Giovanni da Pian del Carpine (Latin: Iohannes de Plano Carpini) in Latin just after he visited Kiev in 1246, contains a brief passage mentioning the siege of Kiev that happened several years earlier. Although frequently cited by earlier historians, the accuracy of this account has been questioned, especially because the passage from the first redaction of Carpini's manuscript copies was substantially expanded in the second redaction, which breaks the narrative of the first, and partially contradicts it.

First redaction of Carpini's Ystoria Mongalorum	Second redaction of Carpini's Ystoria Mongalorum (authenticity disputed)
Subduing this country they attacked Rus', where they made great havoc, destroying cities and fortresses and slaughtering men; and they laid siege of Kiev, the capital of Rus'; after they had besieged the city for a long time, they took it and put the inhabitants to death.	Subduing this country they attacked Rus', where they made great havoc, destroying cities and fortresses and slaughtering men; and they laid siege of Kiev, the capital of Rus'; after they had besieged the city for a long time, they took it and put the inhabitants to death.
–	When we were journeying through that land we came across countless skulls and bones of dead men lying about on the ground. Kiev had been a very large and thickly populated town, but now it has been reduced to almost nothing, for there are at the present time scarce two hundred houses there and the inhabitants are kept in complete servitude.
Going on from there, fighting as they went, the Tatars destroyed the whole of Rus'.	Going on from there, fighting as they went, the Tatars destroyed the whole of Rus'.

While the first redaction text states that the Mongols "put the inhabitants to death", suggesting that the entire population was killed and there were no survivors, this is contradicted by the second-redaction statement that "the inhabitants are kept in complete servitude", meaning that at least some had to be left alive to be "kept in complete servitude". The added text thus seems likely to be an inauthentic interpolation. Questions have also been raised as to whether Carpini really "was describing Kiev or some other town he was told was Kiev", as there are no other extant descriptions of what Kiev looked like at the time, and Carpini does not mention any landmarks such as Saint Sophia Cathedral, Kyiv that would make this identification unambiguous.

== See also ==
- Batu's raid of 1240 in Ruthenia (spring 1239 – autumn 1240)

== Bibliography ==
=== Primary sources ===
- Giovanni da Pian del Carpine, Ystoria Mongalorum (1240s)
- Galician–Volhynian Chronicle (1290s)
  - (in Ukrainian) Galician-Volhynian Chronicle (years 1224–1244), based on the Hypatian Codex. (interpreted by Leonid Makhnovets)
  - Perfecky, George A. (1973). The Hypatian Codex Part Two: The Galician–Volynian Chronicle. An annotated translation by George A. Perfecky. Munich: Wilhelm Fink Verlag. OCLC 902306. (page 48 relates the 1240 sack of Kiev)

=== Literature ===
- Halperin, Charles J. (1987). Russia and the Golden Horde: The Mongol Impact on Medieval Russian History. p. 222. ISBN 9781850430575. (e-book).
- Magocsi, Paul Robert (2010). A History of Ukraine: The Land and Its Peoples. Toronto: University of Toronto Press. p. 894. ISBN 9781442610217.
- Maiorov, Alexander V. (2016). "The Mongolian Capture of Kiev: The Two Dates". The Slavonic and East European Review. 94 (4): 702–714. doi:10.5699/slaveasteurorev2.94.4.0702. JSTOR 10.5699/slaveasteurorev2.94.4.0702.
- Martin, Janet (2007). Medieval Russia: 980–1584. Second Edition. E-book. Cambridge: Cambridge University Press. ISBN 978-0-511-36800-4.
- Ostrowski, Donald (1993). "Why did the Metropolitan Move from Kiev to Vladimir in the Thirteenth Century". Christianity and the Eastern Slavs. Volume I: Slavic Cultures in the Middle Ages. Berkeley: University of California Press. pp. 83–101. ISBN 9780520360198. doi:10.1525/9780520313606-009
  - Ostrowski, Don (30 December 2015). "The Move of the Metropolitan from Kiev in 1299". Academia.edu. p. 26. (updated, open-source version of the same article)
