= Roman Mikhailovich =

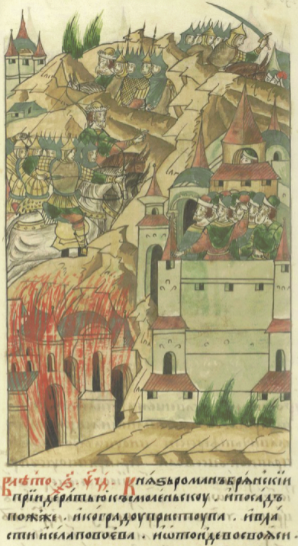
- Roman besieges Smolensk, miniature from the Illustrated Chronicle of Ivan the Terrible (16th century)

Prince of Chernigov (probably)
- Reign: 1246/7 – after 1288
- Predecessor: Michael of Chernigov
- Successor: Oleg IV Romanovich
- House: Olgovichi
- Father: Michael of Chernigov
- Mother: Elena Romanovna

Roman Mikhailovich the Old (c. 1218 – after 1288) was a Rus' prince of the Olgovichi clan. He was Prince of Bryansk (1246 – after 1288), and probably also Prince of Chernigov (1246/7 – after 1288), although most primary sources only mention him as Prince of Bryansk.

Roman was the second son of Mikhail Vsevolodovich of Chernigov (who later became prince of Chernigov, and grand prince of Kiev) by his wife, Elena Romanovna (or Maria Romanovna), a daughter of prince Roman Mstislavich of Halych. His mother most likely persuaded her husband to name their second son after her father. Around 1243, Roman’s elder brother, Rostislav Mikhailovich was disowned by their father when he decided to stay in Hungary.

== Marriage and children ==
#: Anna

- Prince Oleg Romanovich of Chernigov and Bryansk;
- Mikhail Romanovich;
- Olga Romanovna (Elena Romanovna), wife of Prince Vsevolod Vasilkovich of Volhynia.

== Ancestors ==
Ancestors of Roman Mikhailovich

16. Vsevolod II Olgovich, grand prince of Kiev
8. Sviatoslav III Vsevolodovich, grand prince of Kiev
17. Maria Mstislavna of Kiev
4. Vsevolod IV Sviatoslavich, grand prince of Kiev
18. Vasilko Sviatoslavich, prince of Polotsk
9. Maria Vasilkovna of Polotsk
2. Mikhail II Vsevolodovich, grand prince of Kiev
20. Bolesław III, duke of Poland
10. Casimir II, prince of Cracow
21. Salomea of Berg
5. Unknown
22. Conrad II, duke of Moravia
11. Helena of Moravia
23. Mary of Hungary
1. Roman Mikhailovich
24. Iziaslav II Mstislavich, grand prince of Kiev
12. Mstislav II Izyaslavich, grand prince of Kiev
6. Roman Mstislavich, prince of Volhynia and Halych
26. Bolesław III, duke of Poland
13. Agnes
27. Salomea of Berg
3. Elena/Maria Romanovna of Halych
28. Rostislav I Mstislavich, grand prince of Kiev
14. Rurik Rostislavich, grand prince of Kiev
7. Predslava Rurikovna of Kiev
30. Yury Yaroslavich, prince of Turov
15. Anna Yurievna of Turov
31. Unknown Vsevolodovna of Gorodno

== Bibliography ==
=== Primary sources ===
- Giovanni da Pian del Carpine, Ystoria Mongalorum (1240s)
  - DiPlano Carpini, Giovanni (Author) - Hildinger, Erik (Translator): The Story of the Mongols whom We Call the Tartars; Branden Publishing Company, Inc, 1996, Boston, MA; ISBN 0-8283-2017-9.
- Galician–Volhynian Chronicle (c. 1292)
  - Perfecky, George A. (1973). The Hypatian Codex Part Two: The Galician–Volynian Chronicle. An annotated translation by George A. Perfecky. Munich: Wilhelm Fink Verlag. OCLC 902306.

=== Literature ===
- Dimnik, Martin: The Dynasty of Chernigov - 1146-1246; Cambridge University Press, 2003, Cambridge; ISBN 978-0-521-03981-9.
