= Anna II of Kiev =

Anna Yurievna
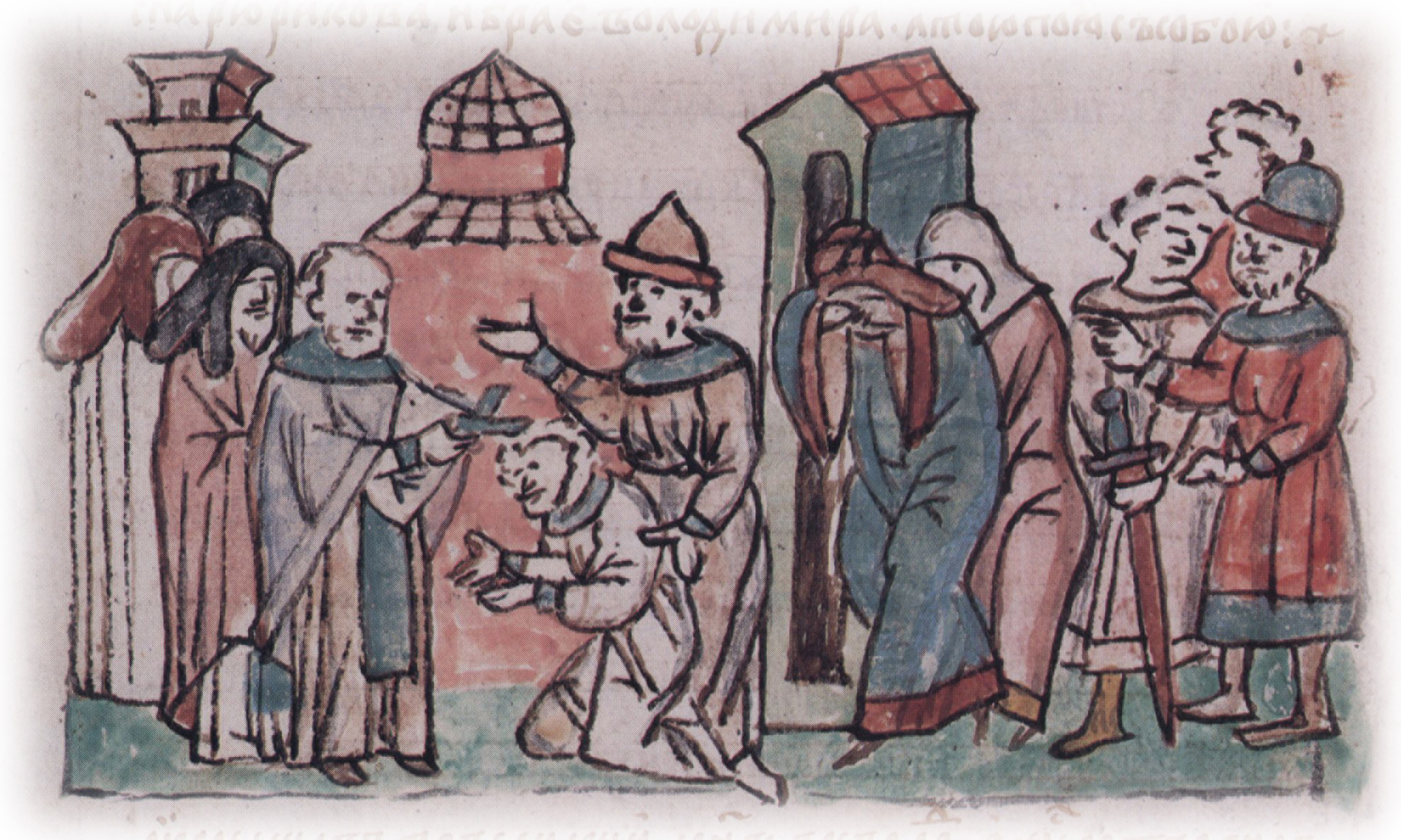
- Capture of Anna and Rurik by Roman Mstislavich, miniature from the Radziwiłł Chronicle (15th century)
- Died: 1205
- Spouse: Rurik Rostislavich
- Issue: Rostislav II of Kiev; Predslava Rurikovna; Vladimir IV Rurikovich
- Father: Yuri of Turov

Anna Yurievna (Ukrainian: Анна Юріївна; died 1205) was a Grand Princess of Kiev by marriage to Rurik Rostislavich. At one point, Roman Mstislavich deposed her husband, then forced the deposed Rurik, as well as Anna, and their daughter, to enter monasteries. She is described in the Kievan Chronicle as an ideal of pious charity.
