= Predslava Rurikovna =

- Princess consort of Volhynia
- Tenure: 1180–1198
- Died: after 1204
- Spouse: Roman the Great
- Issue: Theodora Romanovna; Elena Romanovna; Solomea Romanovna
- House: Rurik
- Father: Rurik Rostislavich
- Mother: Anna II of Kiev

Predslava Rurikovna (died after 1204) was a princess of Volhynia. She was the daughter of Rurik Rostislavich and Anna II of Kiev.

She was married to Roman the Great, the prince of Volhynia, in 1180–1198. In February 1204, he forced a monastic tonsure on Rurik, his wife Anna and daughter Predslava.
