= Siege of Kozelsk =

Siege in 1238 in Kievan Rus'

- Part of the Mongol invasion of Kievan Rus'
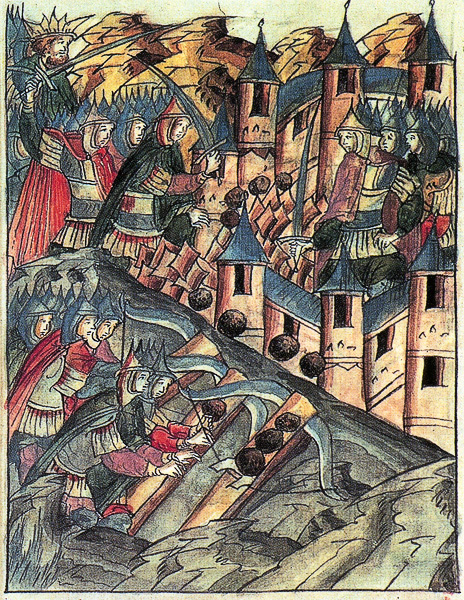
Date	March–May 1238
Location	Kozelsk
Result	Mongol victory

Belligerents
Principality of Chernigov	Mongol Empire

Commanders and leaders
Prince Vasili	Batu Khan; Subutai

Strength
The entire population of the city	On the last day of the siege: 4,000

The siege of Kozelsk was one of the main events of the Western (Kipchak) March of the Mongols (1236–1242) and the Mongol invasion of Kievan Rus' (1237–1240) at the end of the Mongol campaign in northeastern Kievan Rus' (1237–1238). The Mongols laid a siege in the spring of 1238 and eventually conquered and destroyed the town of Kozelsk, one of the subsidiary princely centers of the Principality of Chernigov.

== Background ==
Taking the city of Torzhok on 5 March 1238 after a two-week siege, the Mongols continued to Novgorod. However, they failed to reach the city, mainly because they had difficulties moving in the woods, and after advancing around 100 kilometers at the unknown place designated in the chronicles as the Ignach Cross, they abandoned the plans to conquer Novgorod, turned south, and divided into two groups.

Some of the forces led by Kadan and Storms passed over the Eastern route through the Ryazan land. The main forces led by Batu Khan passed through Dolgomost 30 km east of Smolensk, then entered the Chernigov Principality on the upper Gums, burned Vshchizh, but then abruptly turned to the northeast, bypassing the Bryansk and Karachev, at the end of March 1238 went to the Kozelsk on the Zhizdra River.

At that time the city was the capital of the Principality at the head of twelve-year-old Prince Vasily, grandson of Mstislav Svyatoslavich of Chernigov, who was killed at the Battle of Kalka in 1223. The city was well fortified: surrounded by ramparts built on the walls, but the Mongols had powerful siege equipment.

== Reasons for the long siege ==
The duration of the siege, according to various versions, could be affected by several factors in different combinations, including:

- The overall decline in the fighting capacity of the Mongol army after the first phase of the campaign.
- The slush made impassable valleys of the rivers Zhizdra and into it Kozelsk Druguse and locked the Mongol army on the watershed.
- The slush turned the city into an island fortress.
- Kozelsk was appointed a place of gathering troops.
- The fanatical bravery of the Russian garrison

== Notes ==
1. Duration of freeze-up. Map
2. Civilian V. A. Memory. Roman-Gazeta, No. 16-17 (950-951). Goskomizdat, 1982

== Literature ==
- Nikiforovsky chronicle. Volume 35
- Rashid-Eddin. The Book Of Chronicles. History Of The Mongols. Essay Rashid-Eddine. Introduction: About the Turkish and Mongolian tribes, Transl. from Persian, with introduction and notes by I. P. Berezina // Note the Empire. Architecture. society. 1858. T. 14.
- Karamzin Nikolay Mikhailovich. History of the Russian state. Volume 3

== Links ==
- The conquest of Russia by the Tatar-Mongols\\Interactive map
- Nikiforovsky chronicle. Nikiforovskiy chronicle. Vol. 35. Lithuanian-Belorussian Chronicles
- Karganov V. End the Horde's reign
- Diorama "defense of Kozelsk 1238"
- Vladimir Chivilikhin. Memory. Book two
- Svechin Andrew. Question about apples and Apple trees mid XIII century
- Gumilev L. N. From Rus to Russia. Part two. In Alliance with the Horde. 2. Facing East
