= Siege of Torzhok =

Siege during the Mongol invasion of Rus'

Siege of Torzhok (1238)
- Part of the Mongol invasion of Kievan Rus'
Date	22 February–5 March 1238 (Note: The date of the city's surrender varies between sources, with some giving 5 March and others 23 March 1238.)
Location	Torzhok, Novgorod Republic (modern Russia) 57°02′37″N 34°57′44″E
Result	Mongol victory

Belligerents
Mongol Empire	Novgorod Republic

Commanders and leaders
Batu Khan; Subutai	Ivanko; Yakim Vlunkovich; Gleb Borisovich; Mikhail Moiseevich

Strength
Unknown	Defenders of Torzhok

Casualties and losses
Unknown	Heavy
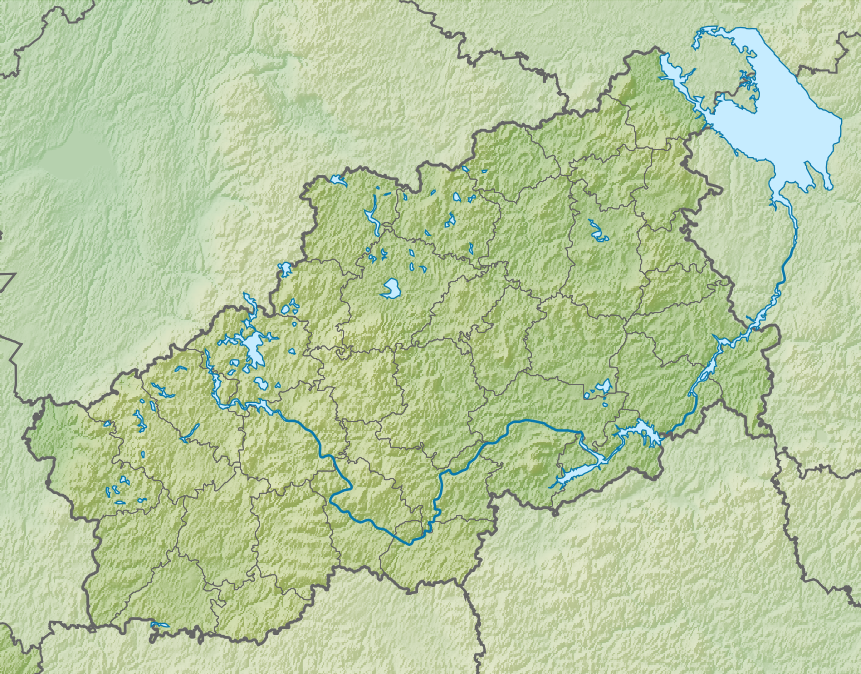
- Location of the siege on a map of Europe Torzhok (Tver Oblast)

The Siege of Torzhok was fought in March 1238 during the Mongol invasion of Rus'. Mongol forces besieged the town of Torzhok in the Novgorod Republic. After a prolonged siege, the town eventually fell to the Mongols, allowing them to continue their expansion towards Novgorod.

== Background ==
Following the capture of Vladimir and Suzdal in February 1238, the Mongol leaders divided their forces. One army defeated and killed the Grand Prince of Vladimir at the Sit River in March 1238, while Batu Khan led another northwards towards Novgorod. His advance towards Lake Ilmen was delayed by the resistance of Torzhok.

== Siege ==
Torzhok resisted the Mongol attacks for two weeks. The Mongols repeatedly attacked its walls with siege engines, while the city received no assistance from Novgorod. Olga Afanasyeva writes that the defenders had covered Torzhok’s walls and gates with ice earlier in the winter, causing Mongol assault ladders to slide down the icy walls during the siege. An article published by MK Tver in 2026 also reports that residents poured water over the fortress walls, where it froze and helped protect them from fire. According to Subutai's biography, Batu personally called him to direct the siege. Subutai brought a special force that apparently included some of his own Uriyangqai archers. The inhabitants eventually surrendered, and the city was captured by the Mongols.

== Aftermath ==
The two-week siege delayed the Mongol advance towards Novgorod. The thaw made the ground unsuitable for Mongol cavalry, forcing Batu to withdraw south. Although the town was destroyed, some historians have claimed that the town's resistance to the Mongols saved Novgorod itself from an attack. During excavations at the Entrance Jerusalem Church, archaeologists found the remains of a building that had burned down in 1238. More than 100 objects were found beneath the burnt remains, along with human bones and weapons such as a mace and battle axe. Archaeologist Natallia Safronava said the remains may belong to a local militiaman who tried to defend the town.
