= Michael of Chernigov =

Grand Prince of Kiev (r. 1236–1239; 1241–1243)

Michael Vsevolodovich
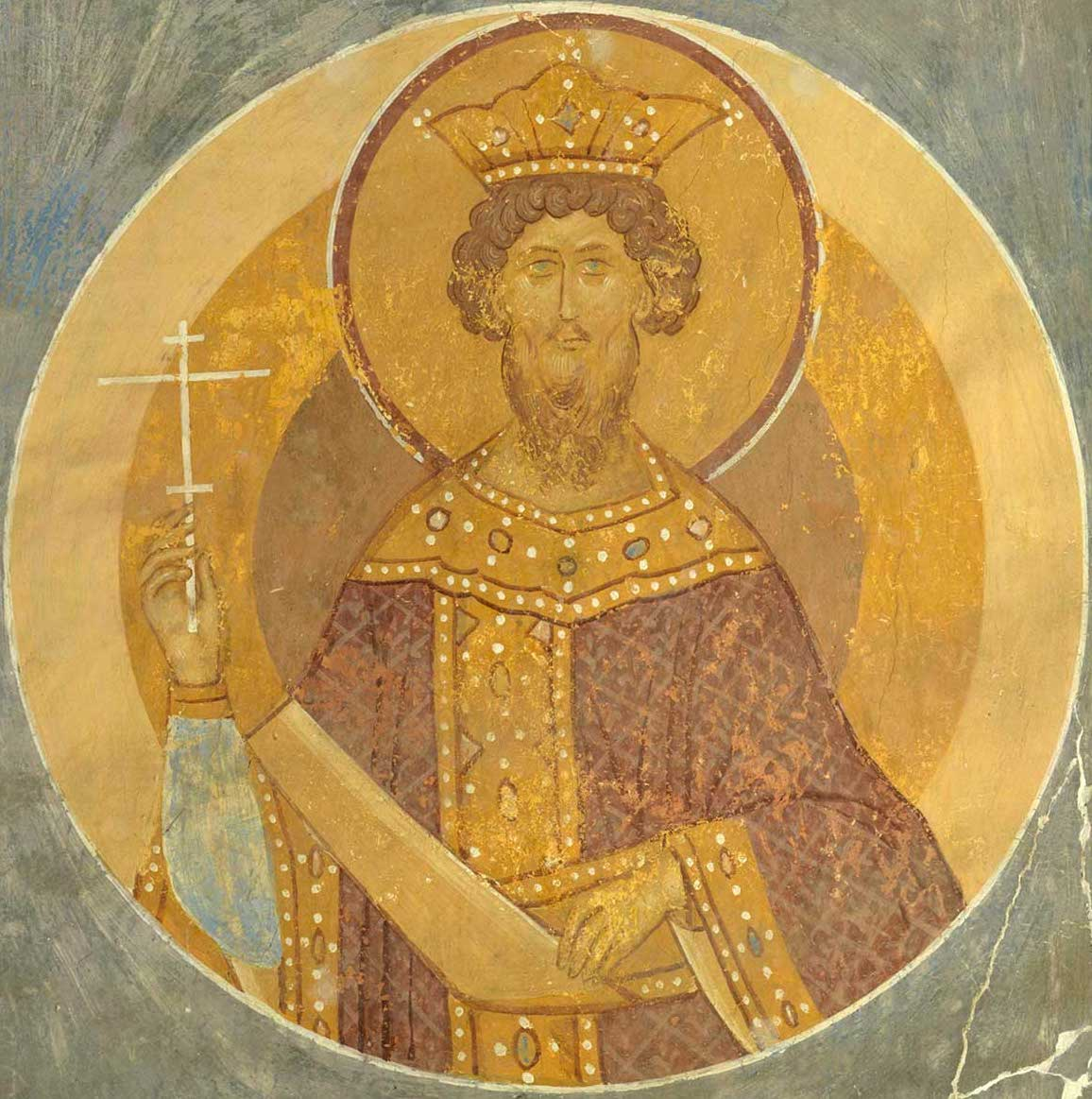
- Fresco of Saint Michael of Chernigov from Ferapontov Monastery, 1502

Prince of Chernigov
- Reign: 1223–1235; 1242–1246
- Predecessor: Mstislav II Svyatoslavich; Mstislav III Glebovich
- Successor: Mstislav III Glebovich; Roman Mikhailovich

Grand Prince of Kiev
- Reign: 1238–1239; 1241–1243
- Predecessor: Yaroslav II of Vladimir; Daniel of Galicia
- Successor: Daniel of Galicia; Yaroslav II of Vladimir
- Born: c. 1185
- Died: 20 September 1246 (age 60-61); Saray, Golden Horde (near modern-day Astrakhan, Russia)
- Spouse: Elena Romanovna
- Issue: Feodula; Rostislav of Macsó; Maria; Roman of Chernigov and Bryansk; Mstislav of Karachev and Zvenigorod; Simeon of Glukhov and Novosil; Yury of Torusa and Bryansk
Names
- Mikhail Vsevolodovich of Chernigov
- House: Olgovichi
- Father: Vsevolod IV of Kiev
- Mother: Anastasia of Poland
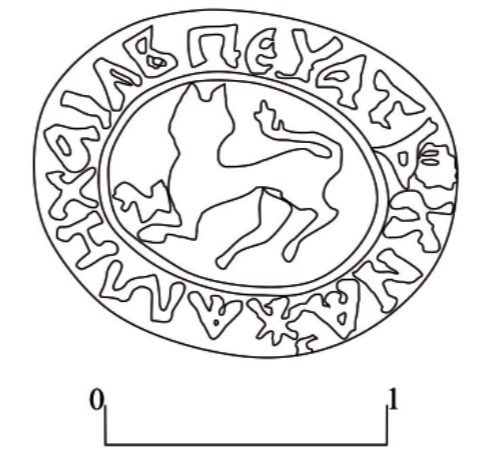
- Seal

Saints Michael and Theodore of Chernigov Wonderworkers
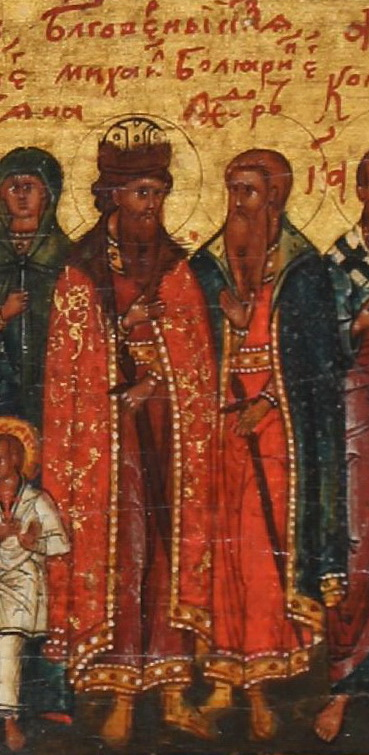
- Holy Martyrs Blessed Prince Michael of Chernigov, and his counsellor Theodore of Chernigov, Wonderworkers

Hieromartyrs
- Died: 20 September 1246; Saray, Golden Horde
- Venerated in: Eastern Orthodox Church, Roman Catholic Church
- Canonized: before 1271, Rostov
- Major shrine: Holy Trinity Cathedral, Chernihiv
- Feast: 20 September

Mikhail Vsevolodovich (Note: Russian: Михаил Всеволодович; Ukrainian: Михайло Всеволодович.) (c. 1185 – 20 September 1246), known as Michael or Michael of Chernigov, (Note: Russian: Михаи́л Черни́говский, romanized: Mikhail Chernigovskij; Ukrainian: Миха́йло Чернігівський, romanized: Mykhailo Chernihivs'kyj) was Grand Prince of Kiev (1236–1239; 1241–1243); he was also Prince of Pereyaslavl (1206), Novgorod-Seversk (1219–1226), Chernigov (1223–1235; 1242–1246), Novgorod (1225–1226; 1229–1230), and Galicia (1235–1236). He was canonized as a saint in the Christian Church.

== Biography ==
A son of prince Vsevolod the Red from the Olgovichi clan, in 1223 Michael participated in the Battle of Kalka against Tatars. After the death of Mstislav the Brave in 1228, he issued claims to the throne of Galicia-Volhynia, which led him into conflict with Daniel and Vasylko, the sons of Roman the Great, and their ally Vladimir Rurikovich.

Archaeological evidence reveals that Chernigov towns enjoyed an unprecedented degree of prosperity during Michael's rule, which suggests that promoting trade was a priority for him. Commercial interests, in part, also motivated him to seize control of Halych and Kiev because they were channels through which goods from the Rhine valley and Hungary passed to Chernigov. He also negotiated commercial treaties and political alliances with the Poles and the Hungarians. He alleviated the tax burden of the Novgorodians and granted their boyars greater political freedom from the prince.

In 1239, during the Mongol invasion of Kievan Rus' (1237–1242), Michaell was forced to flee, taking refuge in Hungary. After returning, he shortly controlled Kyiv, and later applied for a yarlyk from the Mongol khan in order to confirm his rule over Chernigov. In 1246, he was executed by Batu Khan, reportedly after refusing to submit himself to the court rituals at the khan's residence. According to another theory, the cause for Michael's execution was his pro-Western political orientation.

According to tradition, the prince was murdered along with his loyal boyar Theodore, and both were later canonized as martyrs. Their remains were buried in Chernigov's Transfiguration Cathedral, but around 1580 tsar Ivan the Terrible order their removal, after which the relics were transported to Moscow's Cathedral of the Archangel, where they remain up to this day.

== Legacy ==
=== Vita of Michael of Chernigov ===
A hagiography vita of Michael of Chernigov was written some time after his death, describing his life in detail, and framing his execution as martyrdom. It is unclear when this account was written (at least after the Mongol census in Suzdalia and Novgorod in 1257–59), and how historically reliable it is. Mikhail's death is briefly mentioned in the Older Recension of Novgorod First Chronicle (compiled c. 1275), in the Laurentian Codex (compiled 1377), and in the Hypatian Codex (compiled c. 1425), but the full text of the vita is not found in these manuscripts. It is not until the Younger Recension of the Novgorod First Chronicle (compiled c. 1450) that an extensive narrative of his demise appears, stating that the bodies of Mikhail and Fedor were thrown to the dogs; but as a sign of divine favor, their bodies remained unmolested and pillars of fire hovered over them. The Nikon Chronicle (compiled c. 1550) added even more text to Mikhail's vita, including claims that the Mongols already established a system of military governors and tax collectors in all cities of Kievan Rus' in 1237–1240, which is historically very unlikely.

In the early 18th century another hagiography of Michael was created by Demetrius Tuptalo, based on the scheme employed in the similar works dedicated to themartyrdom of saints Boris and Gleb and employing richly ornamented lexicon typical of the Baroque era. In Tuptalo's depiction Michael is shown not as a simple victim of persecution, but as a kind of missionary who consciously sacrificed his life for Christian faith.

=== Carpine account ===
Giovanni da Pian del Carpine, an Italian papal legate who travelled through the lands of former Kievan Rus' in the late 1240s, wrote the following account of his death in the Ystoria Mongalorum:

(…) when Michael, one of the princes of Russia, came to submit to Bati, the Tartars first tried to make him pass between two fires. After this they said that he should bow south to Chingis Khan, but he replied that he would gladly bow to Bati and his servants but not to the image of a dead man because this is improper for a Christian. When he was repeatedly told through his son Yaroslav that he must bow, and yet he refused, Bati ordered Prince Michael killed if he would not bow. Prince Michael of Chernigov was passed between fires in accordance with ancient Turco-Mongol tradition. Batu Khan sent to stab him to death for his refusal to do obeisance to Chingis Khaan's shrine in the pagan ritual imposed by the conqueror. The prince replied that he "preferred to die rather than do what was wrong". Bati sent Michael to one of his followers who trampled on his chest with his boots until the prince died. Meanwhile the prince comforted one of his soldiers who stood near by him by saying: 'Be strong because your punishment will not last long and then at once eternal joy will follow.' After this his head was cut off quickly with a knife. The soldier, to tell the truth, also had his head cut off with a knife.

== Genealogy ==
=== Marriage and children ===
Michael married once and had several children.

- Elena Romanovna (or Maria Romanovna) (m. 1210 or 1211), a daughter of prince Roman Mstislavich of Halych and his wife, Predslava Rurikovna of Kiev
  1. Feodula Mikhailovna (1212–1250); became a nun and adopted the religious name Evfrosinia
  2. Duke Rostislav Mikhailovich of Macsó (c. 1225 – 1262)
  3. Maria Mikhailovna (died 7 or 9 December 1271), wife of Prince Vasilko Konstantinovich of Rostov
  4. Prince Roman Mikhailovich of Chernigov and Bryansk (c. 1218 – after 1288/1305)
  5. Prince Mstislav Mikhailovich of Karachev and Zvenigorod (1220–1280)
  6. Prince Simeon Mikhailovich of Glukhov and Novosil
  7. Prince Yury Mikhailovich of Torusa and Bryansk

=== Ancestors ===
Ancestors of Michael of Chernigov

8. Vsevolod II Olgovich, grand prince of Kiev
4. Sviatoslav III Vsevolodovich, grand prince of Kiev
9. Maria Mstislavna of Kiev
2. Vsevolod IV Sviatoslavich, grand prince of Kiev
10. Vasilko Sviatoslavich, prince of Polotsk
5. Maria Vasilkovna of Polotsk
1. Mikhail Vsevolodovich
12. Bolesław III, duke of Poland
6. Casimir II, prince of Cracow
13. Salomea of Berg
3. Maria/Anastasia of Poland
14. Conrad II of Znojmo
7. Helena of Znojmo
15. Maria of Serbia

=== Descendants ===
The later Upper Oka Principalities of the 14th and 15th centuries were reigned by the "upper princes", each of which descended from Mikhail Vsevolodovich of Chernigov.

In the second half of the 19th century, many family branches stemming from Mikhail flourished: the Baryatinsky, the Gorchakovy, the Dolgorukie, the Eletskie, the Zvenigorodskie, the Koltsovy-Mosalskie, the Obolenskie, the Odoevskie, and the Shcherbatovy.

== Bibliography ==
=== Primary sources ===
- Giovanni da Pian del Carpine, Ystoria Mongalorum (1240s)
  - Modern edition: DiPlano Carpini, Giovanni (Author) - Hildinger, Erik (Translator): The Story of the Mongols whom We Call the Tartars; Branden Publishing Company, Inc, 1996, Boston, MA; ISBN 0-8283-2017-9.
- Galician–Volhynian Chronicle (1290s; oldest copy Hypatian Codex c. 1425)
  - (in Ukrainian) Galician-Volhynian Chronicle (years 1245–1260). (interpreted by Leonid Makhnovets)
  - Perfecky, George A. (1973). The Hypatian Codex Part Two: The Galician–Volynian Chronicle. An annotated translation by George A. Perfecky. Munich: Wilhelm Fink Verlag. OCLC 902306. (pages 52–53 relate the death of Michael of Chernigov)
- Suzdal'–Vladimirian Chronicle (1305; oldest copy Laurentian Codex 1377) (L. 165 sub anno 6754 (1246) relates the death of Michael of Chernigov)

=== Scholarly literature ===
- Dimnik, Martin, Mikhail, Prince of Chernigov and Grand Prince of Kiev, 1224–1246 (1981). pp. 215. Turnhout: Brepols Publishers. ISBN 978-0888440525.
- Dimnik, Martin, The Dynasty of Chernigov, 1146–1246 (2003). Cambridge: Cambridge University Press. ISBN 978-0-521-03981-9.
- Halperin, Charles J. (1987). Russia and the Golden Horde: The Mongol Impact on Medieval Russian History. Indiana University. p. 222. ISBN 9781850430575. (e-book).
- Martin, Janet (2007). Medieval Russia: 980–1584. Second Edition. E-book. Cambridge: Cambridge University Press. ISBN 978-0-511-36800-4.
- Vernadsky, George, Kievan Russia; Yale University Press, 1948, New Haven and London; ISBN 0-300-01647-6.

Michael of Chernigov Olgovichi family Born: c. 1185 Died: 20 September 1246
Preceded by Yaroslav Vsevolodovich	Prince of Pereyaslavl; 1206	Succeeded by Vladimir III of Kiev
Preceded by Mstislav Svyatoslavich	Prince of Novgorod-Seversk; 1219–1226	Succeeded by Oleg Svyatoslavich
Preceded by Mstislav II Svyatoslavich	Prince of Chernigov; 1223–1235	Succeeded by Mstislav III Glebovich
Preceded by Vsevolod Yuryevich	Prince of Novgorod; 1225–1226	Succeeded by Yaroslav Vsevolodovich
Preceded by Fedor Yaroslavich and Aleksandr Yaroslavich	Prince of Novgorod; 1229–1230	Succeeded by Rostislav Mikhailovich
Preceded by Daniil Romanovich	Prince of Halych; 1235–1236	Succeeded by Rostislav Mikhailovich
Preceded by Yaroslav Vsevolodovich	Grand Prince of Kiev; 1238–1239	Succeeded by Daniil Romanovich
Preceded by (Tatar officials appointed by Batu Khan)	Grand Prince of Kiev; 1241–1243	Succeeded by Yaroslav Vsevolodovich
Preceded by Rostislav Mikhailovich	Prince of Chernigov; 1242–1246	Succeeded by Roman Mikhailovich
