= Kornilyevo =

Kornilyevo Корнильево
- Village
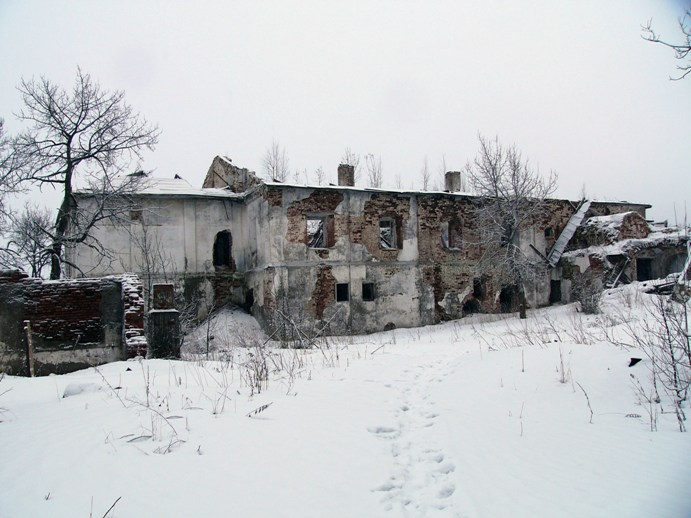
- Old monastery ruins

- Location within Vologda Oblast Location within European Russia Location within Russia
- Coordinates: 58°49′N 40°14′E
- Country: Russia
- Region: Vologda Oblast
- District: Gryazovetsky District
- Time zone: UTC+3:00

Kornilyevo (Russian: Корнильево) is a rural locality (a village) in Rostilovskoye Rural Settlement, Gryazovetsky District, Vologda Oblast, Russia. The population was 99 as of 2002.

== Geography ==
Kornilyevo is located 6 km (3.7 mi) south of Gryazovets (the district's administrative centre) by road. Talitsa is the nearest rural locality.

== History ==
During World War II, the former monastery was the location of a Soviet prisoner-of-war camp for Polish, Finnish and German POWs. Initially, it housed over 3,000 Poles from the German-Soviet invasion of Poland until November 1939, then nearly 700 Finns from the Soviet invasion of Finland until April 1940, and then again 395 Polish POWs from June 1940. Both Poles and Finns were exposed to poor conditions, including cold, shortages of food and medicines, overcrowding, mistreatment by Russian guards and attempts at communist indoctrination. They often suffered from depression and illnesses, and some died. They were also deprived of the possibility of corresponding with relatives. Some Polish POWs were deported to camps in Starobilsk and Ostashkov, and eventually murdered in the Katyn massacre. Following the German invasion of the Soviet Union, in August 1941, Polish General Władysław Anders visited the camp, and the Poles were released to join the Anders' Army. From 1942 to 1948, the camp housed several thousand German POWs.

After 1948, the former camp housed a prison and later a psychiatric hospital.
