= Mongol invasion of Kievan Rus' =

13th-century Mongol military campaign in Europe

Mongol invasion of Rus'
- Part of the Mongol invasion of Europe
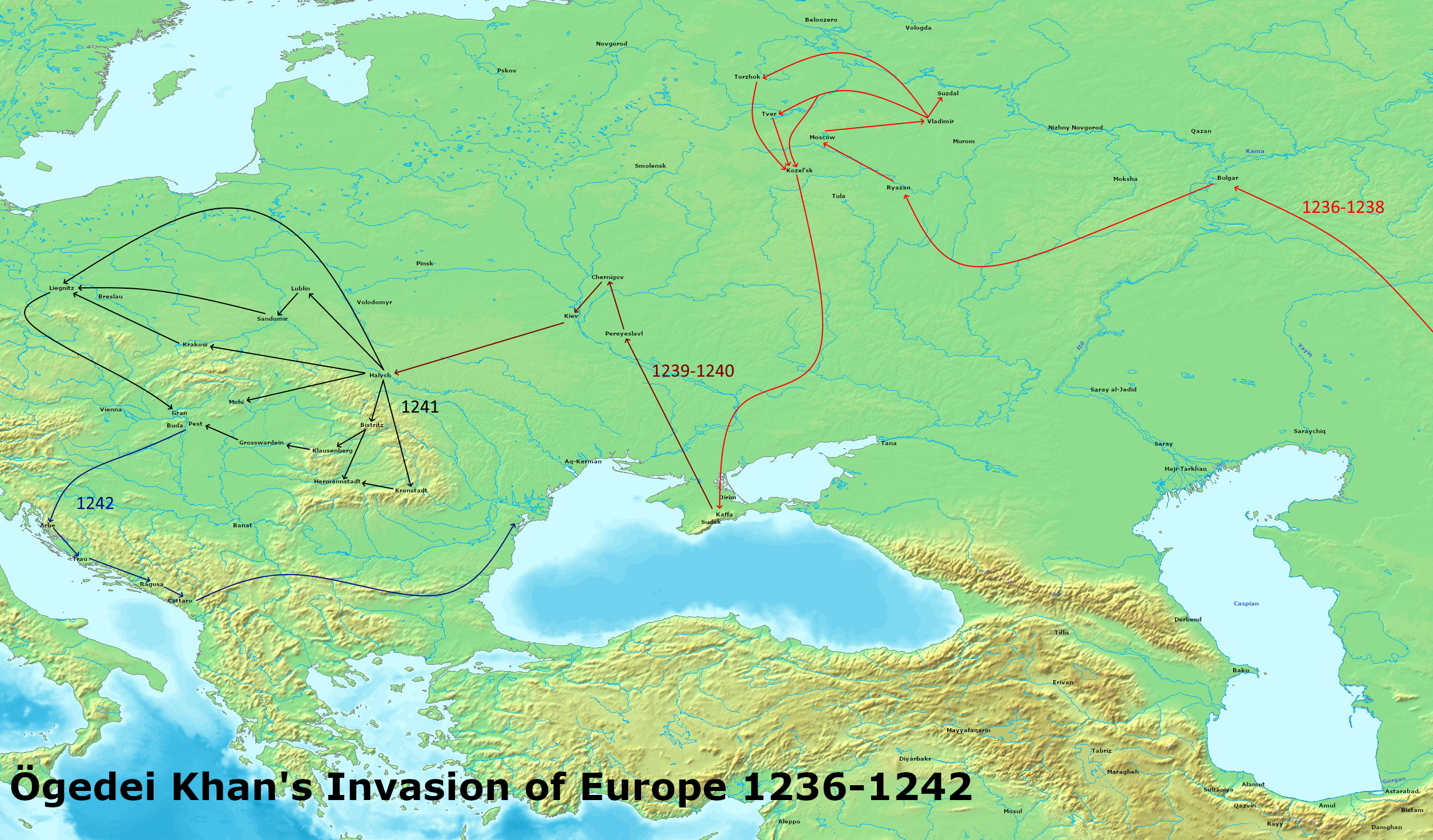
- The Mongol invasion of Europe, 1236–1242
Date	1223 (initial invasion); 1237–1241 (main invasion)
Location	Kievan Rus'
Result	Mongol victory
Territorial changes	Rus' principalities become vassals of the Mongol Empire; Beginning of the Mongol-Tatar Yoke

Belligerents
Mongol Empire	Kiev; Vladimir–Suzdal; Galicia–Volhynia; Smolensk; Rostov; Turov and Pinsk; Chernigov; Ryazan; Pereyaslavl; Cumans (1223)

Commanders and leaders
Batu Khan; Möngke Khan; Subutai; Jebe #; Boroldai; Berke; Orda; Kadan; Shiban; Güyük Khan; Gemebek (executed); Kulkan †	Mstislav the Bold; Daniel of Galicia; Mstislav III of Kiev (executed); Mstislav II of Chernigov †; Yuri II of Vladimir †; Khan Köten (1223)

Strength
c. 60,000	c. 25,000–50,000 total including garrisons and tribesmen (Note: Other historians also agree that it is impossible to determine the size of the military of Kievan Rus'. It is only possible to make a rough calculation of forces in specific battles. The population of the largest centers, which could field troops for resistance, was approx. 30,000.)

The Mongol Empire invaded and conquered much of the Kievan Rus' in the mid-13th century, sacking numerous cities such as Ryazan, Yaroslavl, Pereyaslavl and Vladimir, including the largest: Kiev (50,000 inhabitants) and Chernigov (30,000 inhabitants). The siege of Kiev in 1240 by the Mongols is generally held to mark the end of the state of Kievan Rus', which had already been undergoing fragmentation. Many other principalities and urban centres in the northwest and southwest escaped complete destruction or suffered little to no damage from the Mongol invasion, including Galicia–Volhynia, Pskov, Smolensk, Polotsk, Vitebsk, and probably Rostov and Uglich.

The Mongol campaign was heralded by the Battle of the Kalka River on 31 May 1223, which resulted in a Mongol victory over the forces of several principalities as well as the remnants of the Cumans under Köten. The Mongols retreated, having gathered their intelligence, which was the purpose of the reconnaissance-in-force. A full-scale invasion by Batu Khan followed, with most of Kievan Rus' overrun in 1236–1238. The Mongols captured Kiev in 1240 and moved west into Hungary and Poland. The heavy losses suffered by the Mongols during the invasion period significantly weakened subsequent campaigns, preventing the ruin of the Holy Roman Empire and more western countries.

The invasion was ended by the Mongol succession process upon the death of Ögedei Khan. Even those principalities who avoided physical conquest were eventually forced to accept Mongol supremacy in the form of tribute – as in the case of Galicia–Volhynia, Polotsk and Novgorod – if not outright vassalage, of the Golden Horde, until well into the 14th century. Although a Russian army defeated the Mongols at the Battle of Kulikovo in 1380, the Mongolian demands of tribute from Russian princes continued until about 1480.

The Mongol invasion caused significant destruction in the major cities of the Rus'. It was followed by the rise of Moscow as a major power center of the Russian people. Meanwhile, a series of succession crises caused the fracture of the Mongol Empire, and this eventually enabled the regrouped Russians, under the leadership of Ivan the Terrible, to defeat the successor states of the Mongol Empire such as the Khanate of Kazan and the Astrakhan Khanate to establish their own empire.

== Background ==
Kievan Rus' in 1237

The Mongols had plans to conquer Eastern Europe long before Batu's campaign in 1237. In 1207, Genghis Khan sent his eldest son Jochi to conquer the tribes north of the Selenga River and in the Irtysh valley, which included the lands of Eastern Europe in the Jochi Ulus. However, these plans were not implemented during the lifetime of Genghis Khan. In 1222–1224, Subutai and Jebe conducted a campaign with a 30,000-strong army in Transcaucasia and Southeastern Europe, which is traditionally considered as a reconnaissance. However, the Secret History of the Mongols and Rashid ad-Din state that the purpose of this campaign was to be supported by the forces of Jochi and included Cumania, Alania, Hungary, and Rus', including Kiev. The kurultai of 1235, after which the invasion of Europe took place, repeated these goals. The campaign of Subutai and his 30,000 troops to the Caspian steppes was a new step in the conquest of Eastern Europe, and it began in the late 1220s. In 1235, a kurultai was convened to outline a general Mongol campaign, in which the troops of other uluses (clans or tribes) were to take part. Ögedei sent Batu, Büri, Möngke, and other princes on a campaign to help Subutai, and each Chingizid led with him one or more tumens of the army. The Mongols prepared for an offensive in 1235 and early 1236 and subjugated the Bashkir tribes, who were forced to allocate several detachments to the Mongol army. The Mongols concentrated in the Caspian steppes in the autumn of 1236 under the general leadership of Jochi's son Batu. The first blow of the united Chingizid army targeted Volga Bulgaria.

The princes of Galicia–Volhynia and Chernigov initially defeated the Mongols at Battle of Oleshia in May 1223. The Mongols (called "Tartars" in contemporary accounts) then defeated a united Rus' army led by Mstislav the Bold and Mstislav Romanovich the Old on 31 May 1223 at the Battle of the Kalka River. In 1237, they besieged and took Ryazan, and Vladimir fell in early February 1238. "For our sins", wrote a chronicler, "unknown nations arrived. No one knew their origin or whence they came, or what religion they practiced. That is known only to God, and perhaps to wise men learned in books". Although this defeat left the principalities at the mercy of invaders, the Mongol or Tartar forces retreated and did not reappear for another 13 years, during which time the princes of Rus' went on quarreling and fighting as before, until they were startled by a new and much more formidable invading force. In The Secret History of the Mongols, the only reference to this early battle is:

Then [Genghis Khan] sent Dorbei the Fierce off against the city of Merv, and on to conquer the people between Iraq and the Indus. He sent Subetei the Brave off to war in the North where he defeated eleven kingdoms and tribes, crossing the Volga and Ural Rivers, finally going to war with Kiev.

The Secret History of the Mongols reports that Ögedei sent Batu, Büri, Möngke, and many other princes on a campaign to help Subutai, who was facing strong resistance from various peoples and cities under Genghis Khan's command. The list of Genghisides who participated in the campaign is present in works such as The Secret Legend, Yuan Shi, and Jami' al-tawarikh. In addition to Batu, other Chingizids who participated in the campaign included the sons of Jochi, Orda, Shiban, Tangkut and Berke; the son of Chagatai, Baidar, and the grandson of Chagatai, Büri; the sons of Ögedei, Güyük and Kadan; the sons of Tolui, Möngke and Ariq Böke; the son of Genghis Khan, Külkhan, and the grandson of Genghis Khan's brother, Argasun. In 1235 and early 1236, the assembled army prepared for an offensive, and then subjugated the Bashkir tribes, who were forced to allocate several detachments to the Mongol army. In the autumn of 1236, the Mongols concentrated on the Caspian steppes under the general leadership of Jochi's son Batu.

Europe around 1230, showing Mongol incursions in the east

The first blow of the united Chingizid army struck Volga Bulgaria. Until the mid-1220s, Volga Bulgaria was in constant conflict with the Vladimir-Suzdal and Murom-Ryazan principalities. The parties undertook campaigns, there were constant skirmishes, the victories in which were mainly won by Rus' troops. However, with the appearance of the Mongols at their borders, the Bulgars began to seek peace, which was met with understanding and support from the Rus' princes. Over the course of several years, the Rus' and the Bulgars normalized relations, which allowed the Volga Bulgaria to devote all its forces to preparing to repel the alleged Mongol invasion. Ramparts were created in the forests that covered the main cities, the cities themselves were fortified, and the garrisons increased. However, all these measures were in vain – the Volga Bulgaria was defeated with lightning speed and completely conquered by the spring of 1237.

The next stage of the campaign was an attack on the Cumans and Alans. From the Lower Volga region, the Mongols moved on a broad front to the mouth of the Don, where another concentration of troops took place. The offensive continued until the autumn of 1237 and ended with the defeat of the Cumans and Alans. After that, the Mongols conquered the lands of the Burtas, Mokshas, and Erzyas. The grandiose Zolotarevskoe battle took place near a strategic crossing over the Sura. According to the historian Vadim Kargalov (1932-2009), the fighting in 1237 was undertaken to create a springboard for a campaign against Rus'. By the end of the year, a huge Mongol army and detachments allied with Batu stood on the borders of Russia. Preparations for a winter campaign against Northeastern Rus' by the Mongols began in the autumn of 1237. Their troops were grouped near Voronezh, and detachments that had previously fought with the Cumans and Alans were drawn there.

== Invasion of Batu Khan ==
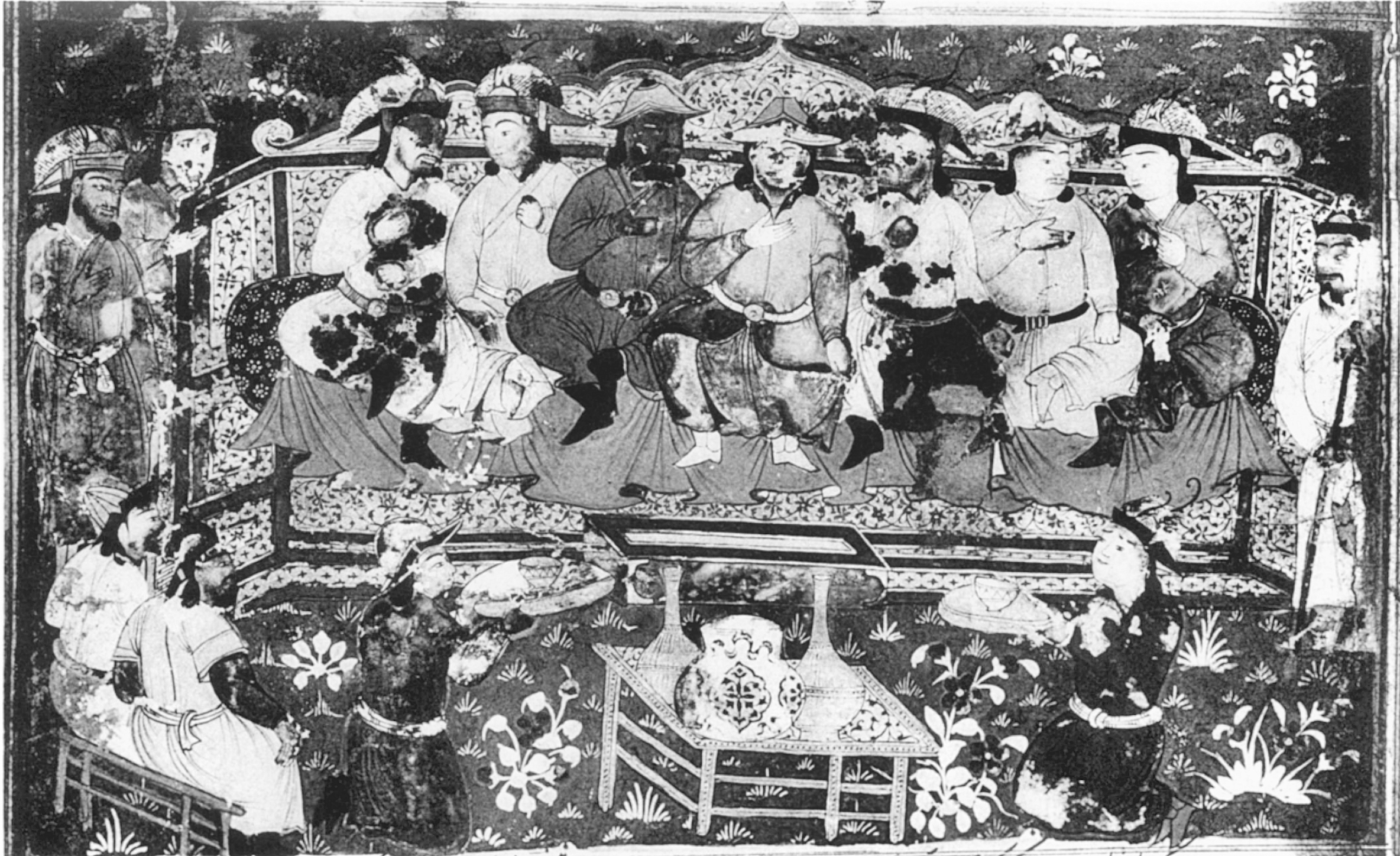
The quriltay of Mongol princes prior to the Russian campaign of 634 (1236 CE). Jami al-Tawarikh, late 14th century (Asiatic Society, D.31, Folio 20 verso)

The vast Mongolian Great Khanate army of around 120,000 mounted archers, commanded by Batu Khan and Subutai, crossed the Volga River and invaded Volga Bulgaria in late 1236. It took them only a month to extinguish the resistance of the Volga Bulgars, the Cumans-Kipchaks and the Alans.

Immediately prior to the invasion, Friar Julian from Hungary had travelled to the eastern border of the Rus' and learned of the Mongol army, which was waiting for the onset of winter so that they could cross the frozen rivers and swamps. In his letter to the Pope's legate in Hungary, Julian described meeting Mongol messengers who had been detained by Yuri II of Vladimir on their way to Hungary. Yuri II gave their letter to Julian.

In November 1237, Batu Khan sent his envoys to the court of Yuri II and demanded his submission. According to the Laurentian Codex, the Mongols actually came seeking peace, but Yuri II treated them with disdain:

As they did before, the messengers came, those evil bloodsuckers, saying: "Make peace with us". He did not want that, as the prophet said: "Glorious war is better than disgraceful peace". These godless men with their deceitful peace will cause great dismay to our lands, as they have already done much evil here.

— Yuri II

Regardless of what impression Yuri II may have given the Mongol delegations, of which several are mentioned, he did his best to avoid direct conflict. He sent them away with what were described as gifts, which were essentially tribute or bribes to keep them from invading.

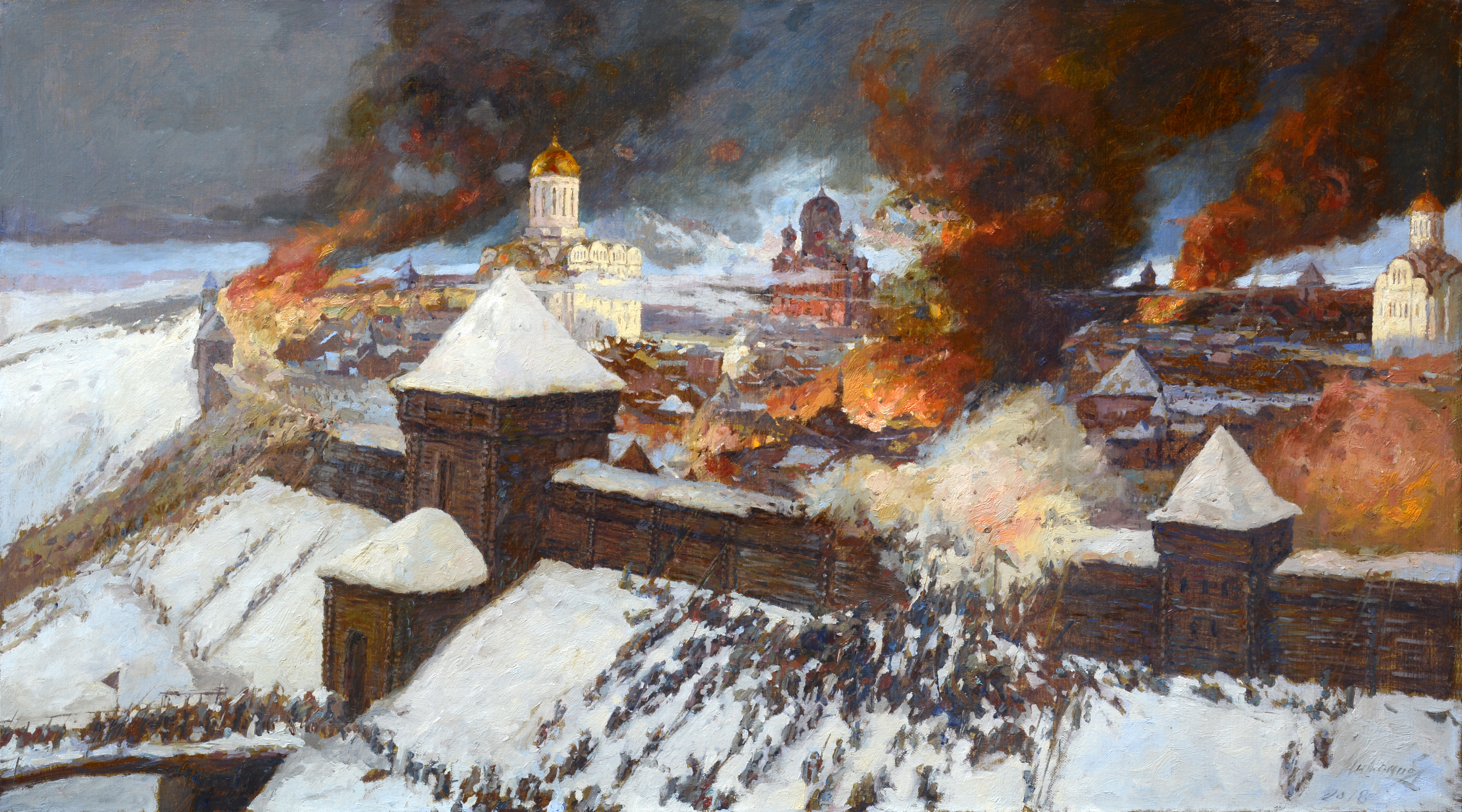
Siege of Ryazan in December 1237

The Mongols attacked from several directions. One section attacked Suzdal, one from the Volga, and another from the south towards Ryazan. According to Rashid al-Din Hamadani, the Siege of Ryazan was conducted by Batu, Orda, Güyük, Möngke, Kulkan, Kadan, and Büri. The city fell after three days. Alarmed by the news, Yuri II sent his sons to detain the invaders, but they were defeated and ran for their lives. Yuri II also fled Vladimir for Yaroslavl.

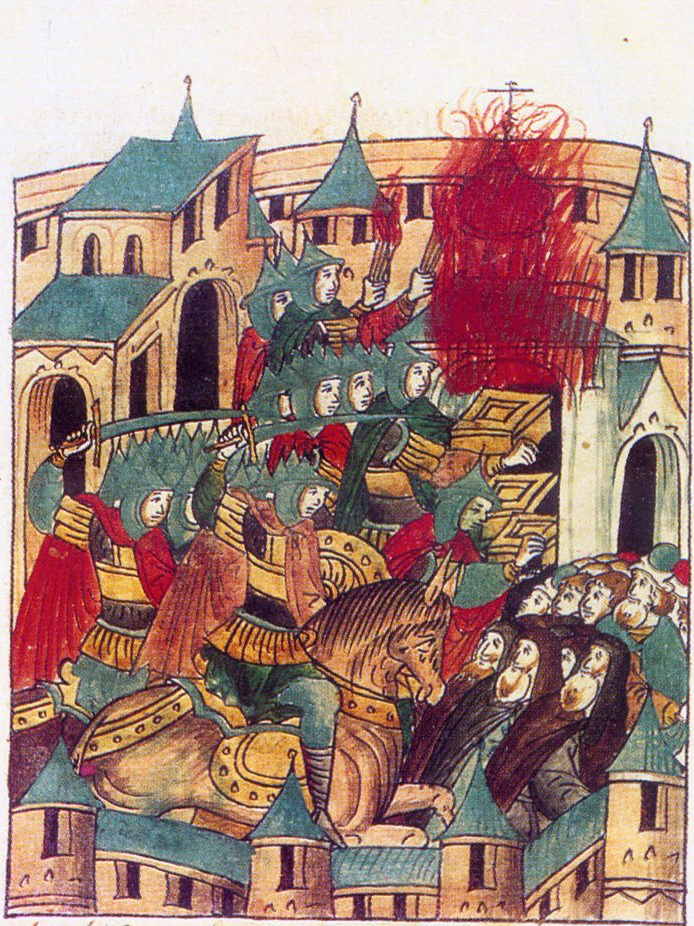
The sacking of Suzdal by Batu Khan in February 1238, miniature from the Illustrated Chronicle of Ivan the Terrible

Having burnt down Kolomna and Moscow, the horde laid siege to Vladimir on 4 February 1238. Three days later, the capital of Vladimir-Suzdal was taken and burnt to the ground. The royal family perished in the fire, while the grand prince retreated northward. Crossing the Volga, Vladimir mustered a new army, which was encircled and totally annihilated by the Mongols in the Battle of the Sit River on 4 March.

And the Tartars took the town [of Ryazan] on December 21... They likewise killed the [Prince] and Knyaginya, and men, women and children, monks, nuns and priests, some by fire, some by the sword and violated nuns, priests' wives, good women and girls in the presence of their mothers and sisters.

— Novgorod Chronicle

Thereupon Batu Khan divided his army into smaller units, which ransacked fourteen cities of northeastern Rus': Rostov, Uglich, Yaroslavl, Kostroma, Kashin, Ksnyatin, Gorodets, Galich, Pereslavl-Zalessky, Yuryev-Polsky, Dmitrov, Volokolamsk, Tver, and Torzhok. Chinese siege engines were used by the Mongols under Tolui to raze the walls of many cities. The most difficult to take was the small town of Kozelsk, whose boy-prince Vasily, son of Titus Mstislavich, and inhabitants resisted the Mongols for seven weeks, killing 4,000. As the story goes, at the news of the Mongol approach, the whole town of Kitezh with all its inhabitants was submerged into a lake, where, as legend has it, it may be seen to this day. Major principalities and urban centres which escaped destruction or suffered little to no damage from the Mongol invasion included Novgorod, Pskov, Smolensk, Polotsk, Vitebsk, and probably Rostov and Uglich. The Mongols planned to advance on Novgorod, but the principality was spared the fate of its brethren by the decision to preemptively surrender. In mid-1238, Batu Khan devastated the Crimea and pacified Mordovia. In the winter of 1239, he sacked Chernigov and Pereyaslavl.

While Kiev and its grand prince was still formally acknowledged as senior amongst the principalities of Rus', frequent internecine dynastic feuding among rival claimants had left the city weakened. Indeed, by the time Kiev fell to the Mongols, the head of the city's defenses owed allegiance to Prince Daniel of the Principality of Galicia–Volhynia. Prince Daniel had taken Kiev under his protection the previous year by arrangement with Prince Michael of Kiev, who fled after originally resisting the Mongols, then losing to them his main stronghold, Chernigov.

The Mongols approach on Kiev in November 1240 apparently made a grim impression upon its defenders. The chronicler wrote, "And nothing could be heard above the squeaking of his carts, the bawling of his [Batu's] innumerable camels, and the neighing of his herds of horses, and the Land of Rus’ was full of enemies." After many days of siege, the horde stormed Kiev in December 1240. The city was ransacked and pillaged immensely, although the building of St. Sophia Cathedral survived intact. Historian Serhii Plokhy relates the description of one Giovanni da Pian del Carpine, an ambassador of Pope Innocent IV who passed through Kiev six years later: "When we were journeying through that land, we came across countless skulls and bones of dead men lying about on the ground".

Batu Khan's forces went on to ravage much of Galicia–Volhynia, despite Daniel's fierce resistance. However, Batu Khan failed to capture Kremenets, Danilov and Kholm, which he was forced to bypass after unsuccessful sieges. The Tartars then resolved to "reach the ultimate sea", where they could proceed no further and invaded Hungary (under Batu Khan) and Poland (under Baidar and Kaidu). Batu Khan captured Pest, and then on Christmas Day 1241, Esztergom.

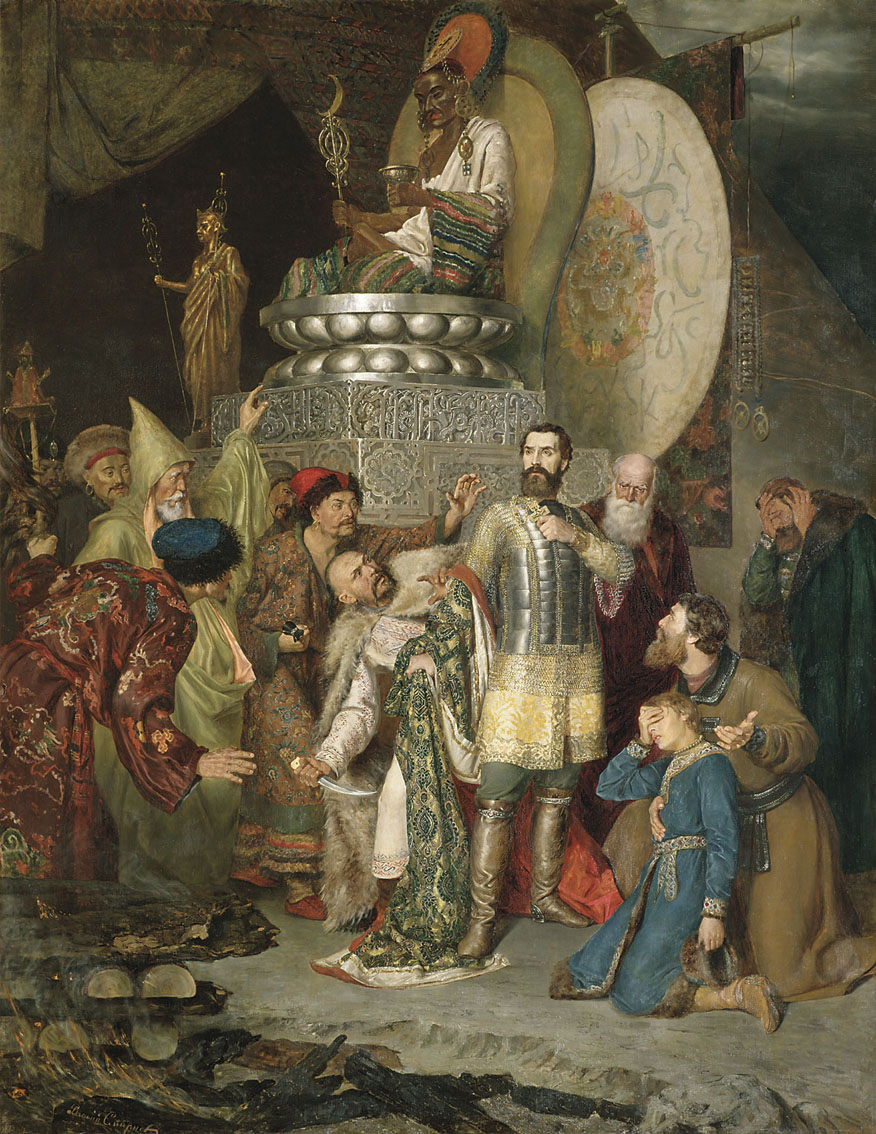
Prince Michael of Chernigov was passed between fires in accordance with ancient Turco-Mongol tradition. Batu Khan ordered him to prostrate himself before the tablets of Genghis Khan. The Mongols stabbed him to death for his refusal to do obeisance to Genghis Khan's shrine.

The principalities became part of the Jochid appanage ruled by Batu. Batu sited a semi-nomadic capital, called Sarai or Sarai Batu (Batu's Palaces), on the lower Volga. The Jochid appanage came to be known as the Golden Horde.

== Legacy ==
=== Carpine's account ===
The Ystoria Mongalorum, written by Italian diplomat Giovanni da Pian del Carpine (Latin: Iohannes de Plano Carpini) in Latin just after he visited Kiev in 1246, contains a brief passage mentioning the siege of Kiev that happened several years earlier. Although frequently cited by earlier historians, the accuracy of this account has been questioned, especially because the passage from the first redaction of Carpini's manuscript copies was substantially expanded in the second redaction, which breaks the narrative of the first, and partially contradicts it.

First redaction of Carpini's Ystoria Mongalorum	Second redaction of Carpini's Ystoria Mongalorum (authenticity disputed)
Subduing this country they attacked Rus', where they made great havoc, destroying cities and fortresses and slaughtering men; and they laid siege of Kiev, the capital of Rus'; after they had besieged the city for a long time, they took it and put the inhabitants to death.	Subduing this country they attacked Rus', where they made great havoc, destroying cities and fortresses and slaughtering men; and they laid siege of Kiev, the capital of Rus'; after they had besieged the city for a long time, they took it and put the inhabitants to death.
–	When we were journeying through that land we came across countless skulls and bones of dead men lying about on the ground. Kiev had been a very large and thickly populated town, but now it has been reduced to almost nothing, for there are at the present time scarce two hundred houses there and the inhabitants are kept in complete servitude.
Going on from there, fighting as they went, the Tatars destroyed the whole of Rus'.	Going on from there, fighting as they went, the Tatars destroyed the whole of Rus'.

While the first redaction text states that the Mongols "put the inhabitants to death", suggesting that the entire population was killed and there were no survivors, this is contradicted by the second-redaction statement that "the inhabitants are kept in complete servitude", meaning that at least some had to be left alive to be "kept in complete servitude". The added text thus seems likely to be an inauthentic interpolation. Questions have also been raised as to whether Carpini really "was describing Kiev or some other town he was told was Kiev", as there are no other extant descriptions of what Kiev looked like at the time, and Carpini does not mention any landmarks such as Saint Sophia Cathedral, Kyiv that would make this identification unambiguous.

=== Impact on development ===
The influence of the Mongol invasion on the territories was uneven. Colin McEvedy estimates the population dropped from 7.5 million prior to the invasion to seven million afterwards. Centres such as Kiev took centuries to rebuild and recover from the devastation of the initial attack. The Novgorod Republic continued to prosper, and a new entity, the Principality of Moscow, began to flourish under the Mongols.

Moscow's eventual dominance in northeastern Rus' was in large part attributable to the Mongols. Moscow drew people and wealth, developed trade links, and established an autocratic political system which exerted a powerful influence on Russian society. After the prince of Tver led an uprising in 1327, the rival prince Ivan I of Moscow joined the Mongols in crushing Tver and devastating its lands. By doing so, he eliminated his rival, allowed the Russian Orthodox Church to move its headquarters to Moscow, and was granted the title of Grand Prince by the Mongols.

As such, the Muscovite prince became the chief intermediary between the Mongol overlords and the Russian princes, which paid further dividends for Moscow's rulers. In the 14th century, the Muscovite princes began "gathering Russian lands" to increase its population and wealth. While the Mongols often raided other territories, they tended to respect the lands controlled by their principal collaborator. This, in turn, attracted nobles and their servants who sought to settle in the relatively secure and peaceful lands of Moscow. Although a Russian army defeated the Golden Horde at the Battle of Kulikovo in 1380, the Mongol domination of Russian-inhabited territories, with the requisite demands of tribute, continued until the Great Stand on the Ugra River in 1480.

==== Decline of cities ====
The invasion had significant consequences on the population. Many cities and fortified points were wiped out, with only a fraction surviving. The once flourishing cities of Kiev, Novgorod, and Vladimir suffered a sharp decline, with their populations shrinking to a fraction of what they were before the invasion. For example, Kiev, which had around 50,000 people, had only about 200 houses left after the invasion, according to the papal legate Giovanni da Pian del Carpine.

The decline of cities was also accompanied by a decline in culture, crafts, and trade. The pre-Mongol period was considered the heyday of culture, crafts, and trade in ancient Rus', but after the invasion, many cities fell into decay, and stone construction was halted for a long time. Economic ties between cities and surrounding villages were severed, and it took more than 100 years for Russian cities to recover from the invasion of Batu Khan and its consequences.

The destruction of cities and the decline in culture and economy had long-term consequences for Russia. The country was left behind in terms of economic development. The Mongol-Tatar invasion also had a significant impact on Russia's political development, as it paved the way for the emergence of the centralized Moscow state, which gradually absorbed other principalities and became the dominant power in Russia. Overall, the invasion of Batu Khan had a profound and lasting impact on the history of Russia.

==== Economic setbacks ====
Stone construction in Russian cities practically ceased for several decades. The production of complex crafts, such as glass jewelry, Cloisonné enamel, niello, granulation, and polychrome glazed ceramics stopped. As a result, the Russian handicraft industry regressed several centuries, while the guild industry in the West progressed to the era of primitive accumulation. The Russian handicraft industry had to reacquire the gains that had been made before the invasion.

==== Population migration ====
As a result of the invasion many people were forced to flee in front of the advancing tumens of Batu, and in northeastern Rus', residents of the Vladimir-Suzdal and Ryazan principalities sought refuge in more northern lands beyond the Volga. Others fled to sparsely populated areas, taking refuge in dense forests. However, after the departure of the Mongol-Tatars, most of them returned to their former places of residence.

In fact, just a year after the fall of the Vladimir-Suzdal principality, the number of returnees was so great that Prince Yaroslav Yaroslavich was able to gather a large army among them for a campaign against the Lithuanians. Meanwhile, the inhabitants of South Russia's principalities, such as Kiev, Pereyaslav, and Chernigov, fled to northeastern Russia immediately after the invasion.

However, this was not the end of population migrations. Vladimir, Suzdal, Pereslavl-Zalessky, and other cities of northeastern Rus' were repeatedly targeted by Mongol-Tatar campaigns in the second half of the 13th century. As a result, many of their inhabitants gradually moved either to the vicinity of Moscow and Tver, or to the north in regions such as Yaroslavl, Galich, Veliky, Ustyug, and more.

=== Influence on society ===
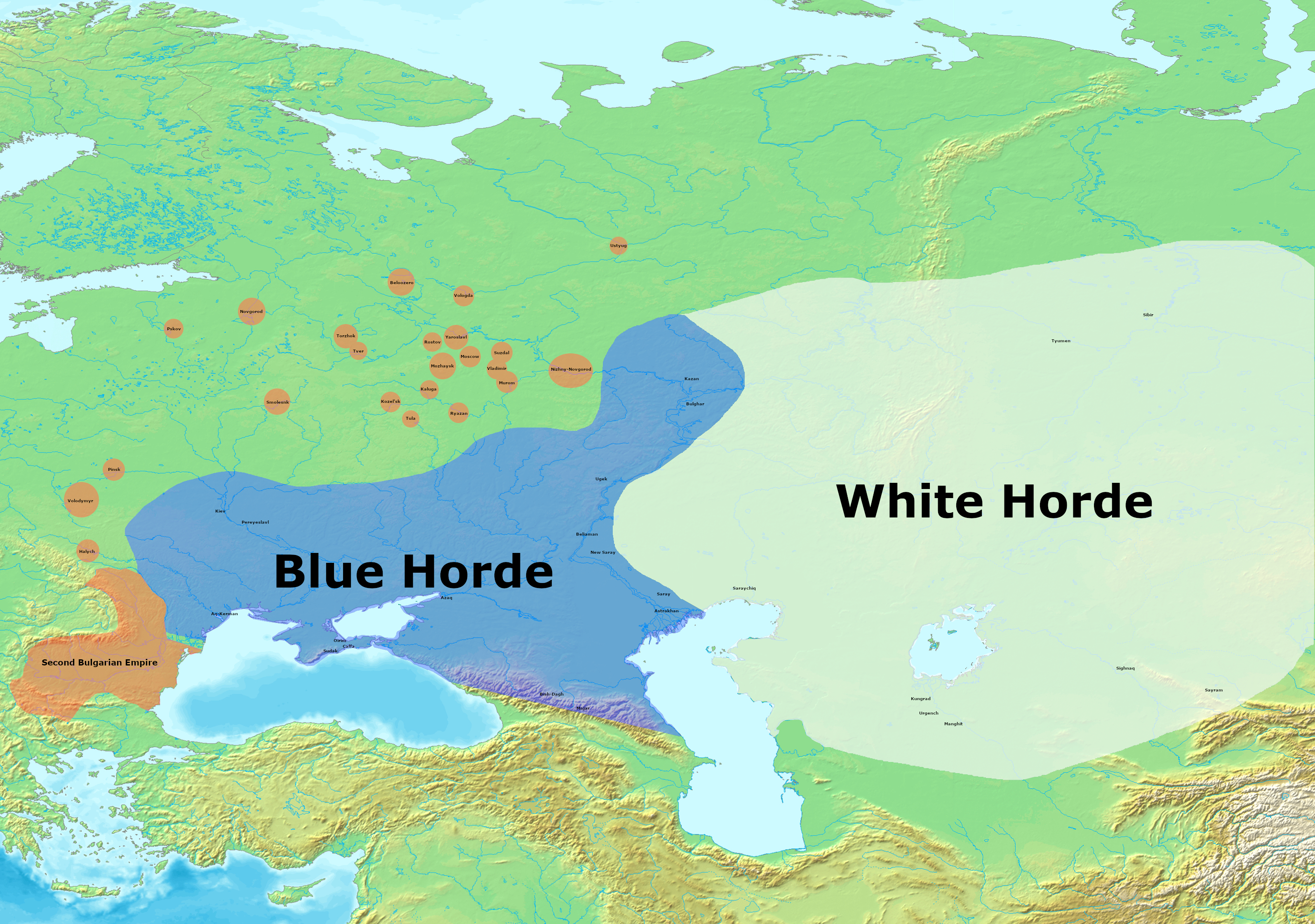
The Golden Horde and its tributaries in 1313 under Özbeg Khan

Historians have debated the long-term influence of Mongol rule on society. The Mongols have been blamed for the destruction of Kievan Rus' and the breakup of a "Russian" nationality into three components, and the introduction of the concept of "oriental despotism" into Russia. Such fears also manifested into the Yellow Peril inside Imperial Russia.

However, most historians agree that Kievan Rus' was not a homogenous entity in a political, cultural, or ethnic sense, and that the invasions only accelerated the period of feudal fragmentation that had begun prior to the invasions. Historians also credit the Mongol regime with an important role in the development of Muscovy as a state. Under Mongol occupation, for example, Muscovy developed its mestnichestvo hierarchy, postal road network (based on Mongolian ortoo system, known in Russian as "yam", hence the terms yamshchik, Yamskoy Prikaz, etc.), census, fiscal system and military organization.

The period of Mongol rule over the former Rus' polities included significant cultural and interpersonal contacts between the Slavic and Mongolian ruling classes. By 1450, the Tatar language had become fashionable in the court of the Grand Prince of Moscow, Vasily II, who was accused of excessive love of the Tatars and their speech, and many Russian noblemen adopted Tatar surnames (for example, a member of the Veliamanov family adopted the Turkic name "Aksak" and his descendants were the Aksakovs).

Many Russian boyar (noble) families traced their descent from the Mongols or Tatars, including Veliaminov-Zernov, Godunov, Arseniev, Bakhmetev, Bulgakov (descendants of Bulgak) and Chaadaev (descendants of Genghis Khan's son Chagatai Khan). In a survey of Russian noble families of the 17th century, over 15% of the Russian noble families had Tatar or Oriental origins.

The Mongols brought about changes in the economic power of states and overall trade. In the religious sphere, St. Paphnutius of Borovsk was the grandson of a Mongol baskak, or tax collector, while a nephew of Khan Bergai of the Golden Horde converted to Christianity and became known as the monk St. Peter Tsarevich of the Horde.

In the judicial sphere, under Mongol influence capital punishment, which during the times of Kievan Rus' had only been applied to slaves, became widespread, and the use of torture became a regular part of criminal procedure. Specific punishments introduced in Moscow included beheading for alleged traitors and branding of thieves (with execution for a third arrest).

Donald Ostrowski argues that Muscovy's adoption of Mongol institutions and practices may demonstrate the pragmatism of the Muscovite leaders, which enabled them to eventually "triumph over their competitors in northeastern Rus'".

== Historiography ==
According to Charles J. Halperin (2011), Fomenko and Nosovskii's popular pseudohistorical Novaia khronologiia (New Chronology), which received some attention in the early 1980s, arose out of "the dilemma of the Mongol conquest in Russian historiography": embarrassment among defensive Russian nationalists who object to "Russophobic" arguments that Russia acquired "barbarian" customs, institutions, and culture from uncivilized nomads.

American Cold War analysts, also linked the Soviet government's autocratic rule to Tatar influences during its history, and biographies of Russian leaders often stressed their possible Asiatic ancestries. They maintained that Asiatic influences rendered the Russians untrustworthy.

== See also ==
- List of battles of the Mongol invasion of Kievan Rus'
- List of wars involving Kievan Rus'
- Mongol invasions of Durdzuketia

== Primary sources ==
- Full Collection of Russian Annals, St. Petersburg, 1908 and Moscow, 2001, ISBN 5-94457-011-3.
