= Mstislav III Glebovich =

The Kievan Rus’ in 1237

Mstislav III Glebovich (before 1215/1220 – after October 18, 1239) was an Olgovichi prince. He was probably prince of Rylsk (1212–1239/1241) and of Chernigov (1235–1239/1241). During his reign, the Tatars (the Mongols) invaded and pillaged the towns of the Principality of Chernigov.

He was the son of Prince Gleb Svyatoslavich of Chernigov and Anastasia Ryurikovna, a daughter of Grand Prince Ryurik Rostislavich of Kiev. His father died between 1215 and 1220.

By 1225, Mstislav had already been second in seniority among the Olgovichi (the ruling dynasty of Chernigov), and therefore during the absence of his cousin, Mikhail Vsevolodovich, he commanded them. On April 6, 1231, he attended a snem (a meeting of some leading princes of Rus’ organized by Grand Prince Vladimir III of Kiev) in Kiev, but the reasons for convoking the council are not given. It appears that his domain probably lay west of the Snov and Desna rivers.

== Ancestors ==
Ancestors of Mstislav Glebovich

16. Oleg Svyatoslavich, prince of Chernigov
8. Vsevolod II Olgovich, grand prince of Kiev
17. Theophano Musalonissa
4. Sviatoslav III Vsevolodovich, grand prince of Kiev
18. Mstislav Vladimirovich, grand prince of Kiev
9. Maria Mstislavna of Kiev
19. Christine of Sweden
2. Gleb Svyatoslavich, prince of Chernigov
20. Sviatoslav Vseslavich, prince of Polotsk
10. Vasilko Svyatoslavich of Polotsk
5. Maria Vasilkovna of Polotsk
1. Mstislav Glebovich
24. Mstislav Vladimirovich, grand prince of Kiev
12. Rostislav I Mstislavich, grand prince of Kiev
25. Christine of Sweden
6. Ryurik Rostislavich, grand prince of Kiev
3. Anastasia Ryurikovna of Kiev
28. Yaroslav Svyatopolkovich, prince of Volynia
14. Yury Yaroslavich, prince of Turov
29. Unknown of Poland
7. Anna Yurievna of Turov
30. Vsevolod Igorevich, prince of Gorodno
15. Unknown Vsevolodovna of Gorodno
31. Agafia Vladimirovna of Kiev

== Sources ==
- Dimnik, Martin: The Dynasty of Chernigov - 1146-1246; Cambridge University Press, 2003, Cambridge; ISBN 978-0-521-03981-9.

Preceded by Roman Igorevich	Prince of Rylsk; 1212–1239/1241	Succeeded by Andrey Mstislavich
Preceded by Mikhail I Vsevolodovich	Prince of Chernigov; 1235–1239/1241	Succeeded by Rostislav I Mikhailovich
