= Kozelsk =

Town in Kaluga Oblast, Russia

Kozelsk Козельск
- Town
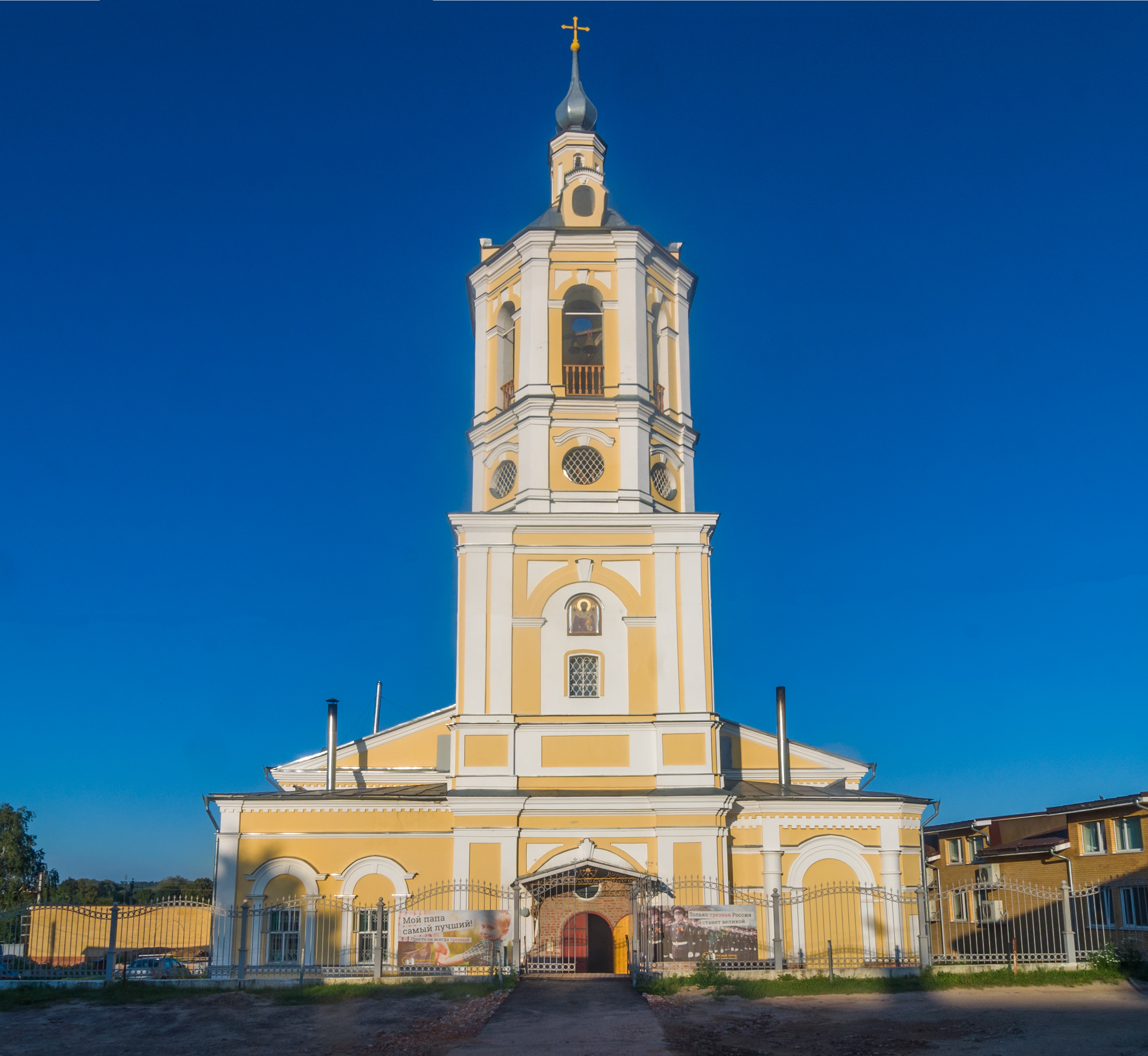
- Saint Nicholas church

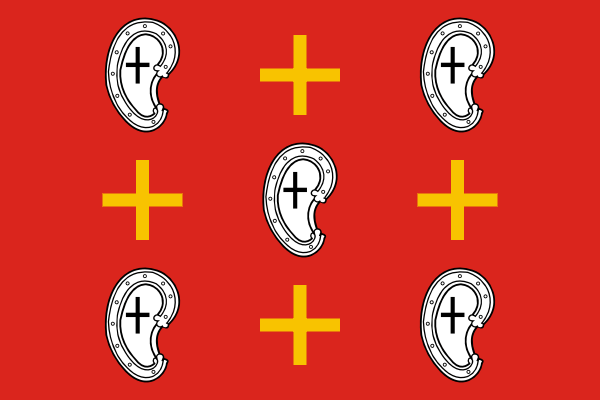
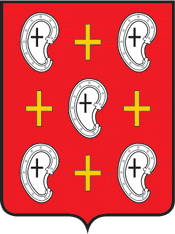
- Flag Coat of arms
- Interactive map of Kozelsk
- Location of Kozelsk Kozelsk (European Russia) Kozelsk (Russia)
- Coordinates: 54°02′07″N 35°46′36″E
- Country: Russia
- Federal subject: Kaluga Oblast
- Administrative district: Kozelsky District
- First mentioned: 1146
- Elevation: 150 m (490 ft)

Population (2010 Census)
  - Total: 18,245
  - Estimate (2023): 16,603 (−9%)

Administrative status
  - Capital of: Kozelsky District

Municipal status
  - Municipal district: Kozelsky Municipal District
  - Urban settlement: Kozelsk Urban Settlement
  - Capital of: Kozelsky Municipal District, Kozelsk Urban Settlement
- Time zone: UTC+3 (MSK)
- Postal codes: 249720, 249722, 249723, 249725, 249739
- Dialing code: +7 48442
- OKTMO ID: 29616101001
- Website: kozelsk-adm.ru

Kozelsk (Russian: Козе́льск) is a town and the administrative center of Kozelsky District in Kaluga Oblast, Russia, located on the Zhizdra River (a tributary of the Oka), 72 kilometers (45 mi) southwest of Kaluga, the administrative center of the oblast. Population: 16,759 (2021 census); 18,245 (2010 census); 19,907 (2002 census); 19,735 (1989 Soviet census).

== History ==
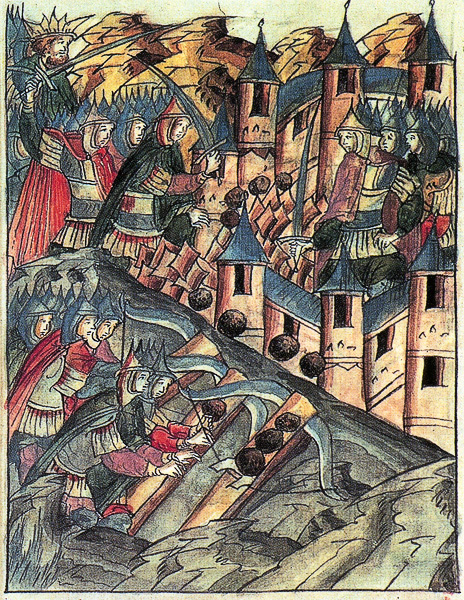
Kozelsk siege in 1239 by Batu Khan

It was first mentioned in an 1146 chronicle as a part of Principality of Chernigov. Kozelsk became famous in the spring of 1238, when its twelve-year-old prince Vasily, son of Titus, had to defend the town against the army of Batu Khan. The latter dubbed it an "evil town" because its citizens had been fighting the attackers for seven weeks in a row, killing around four thousand enemy soldiers during the siege. The citizens of Kozelsk were greatly outnumbered and almost all of them died in battle.

In 1446, Kozelsk was temporarily under the rule of the Grand Duchy of Lithuania. In 1494, the town was finally annexed by the Grand Duchy of Moscow. In 1607, one of Ivan Bolotnikov's units was located in Kozelsk and showed resistance to the Tsar's army.

The much-venerated monastery, Optina Pustyn, is close by. In the 19th century, this hermitage gained wide renown for its "startsy".

After the outbreak of World War II, a POW camp was established in the monastery for Polish officers taken captive by the Red Army during the Polish Defensive War of 1939. Between April and May 1940, the NKVD transferred approximately 5,000 of them to a forest near Katyn, where they were executed in what became known as the Katyn massacre. The remaining two hundred officers were sent to a camp in Pavlishchev Bor and then to Kornilyevo.

The town was occupied by the German army from October 8, 1941 until December 27, 1941 and suffered considerable damage. It was rebuilt after the war.

== Administrative and municipal status ==
Within the framework of administrative divisions, Kozelsk serves as the administrative center of Kozelsky District, to which it is directly subordinated. As a municipal division, the town of Kozelsk is incorporated within Kozelsky Municipal District as Kozelsk Urban Settlement.

== Military ==
After World War II, Kozelsky District became the home for the 28th Guards Rocket Division of the Strategic Missile Troops. Up to a third of the population of Kozelsk was connected in one way or another with the missile division.

It has missiles silos with RS-24 Yars ICBMs.

== See also ==
- Upper Oka Principalities
- Bibliography of Russian history
