= Ystoria Mongalorum =

1245–1247 report by Giovanni da Pian del Carpine

Ystoria Mongalorum is a report on the land and history of Mongolia, compiled by a friar from the Francisian Order, Giovanni da Pian del Carpine. Written between 1245 and 1247, Giovanni's Chronicle of Mongol History is the first authentic medieval European account of the Mongols.

== Background ==
Giovanni's mid-thirteenth-century travels to Mongolia are responding to the wider geopolitical changes and threats in the western hemisphere regarding Christendom. Following Tartar military incursions onto Eastern European soil in 1241, and a lack of cooperation between Catholic European Allies like Holy Roman Emperor Frederick II, and the French king Louis IX, left Pope Innocent IV to take the reins of trying to avoid further Tartar incursions onto European soil. Likewise, the lack of cohesive support from European monarchs in providing concrete solutions to control the situation, further exasperated the fears of the Germans and Poles, whose land the Tartars were impeding.

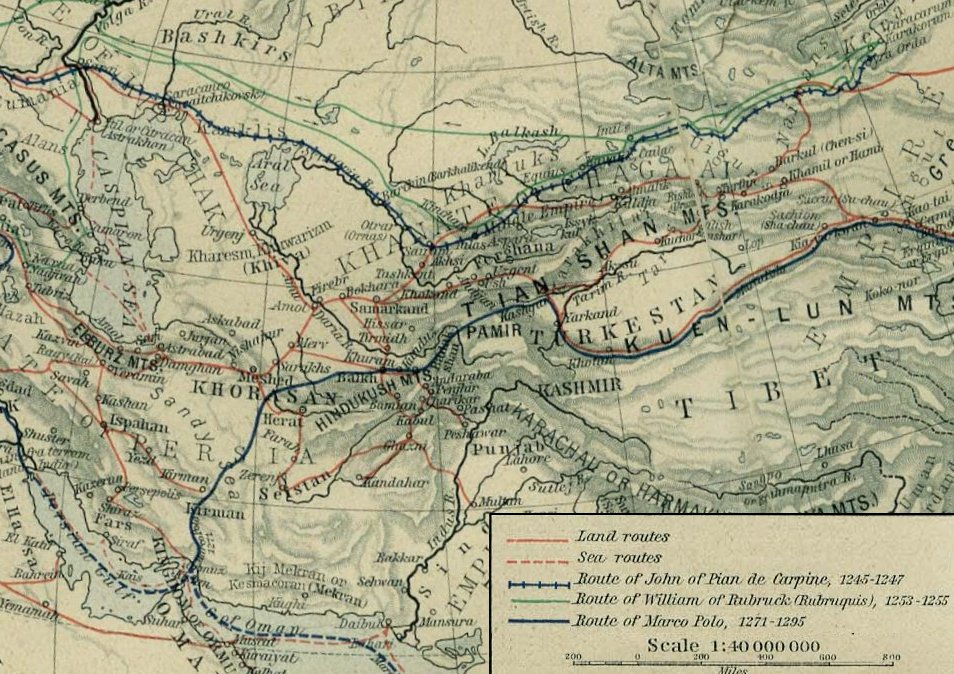
This is a map of European thirteenth-century trade and travel routes to Asia. Giovanni's route to Mongolia is the dark blue path.

Pope Innocent IV preferred members from the Franciscan Order for their familiarity with travel as they "were expected to spread the gospel by travelling outside of the order." Likewise, joining Giovanni on the envoy was Benedict of Poland, who enlisted as an interpreter and was valued for his contacts with Eastern European Princes who supported Christianity. On April 16, 1245, Pope Innocent IV chose Giovanni to lead an envoy from Lyon, France, to the Mongolian empire. The envoy was sent to deliver a letter to the Mongolian Emperor Güyük Khan (Chan) to urge him to convert to Christianity and to refrain from further attacks on Christians, "we were afraid that in the near future the Church of God would be threatened by danger from that quarter [Tartars]."

The title is significant, as it emphasizes that the Mongols were not identical to the Tatars. In fact, the author points out that Mongols were quite offended by such a label: they vanquished Tatars in several campaigns around 1206, after which the Tartars ceased to exist as an independent ethnic group.

The book must have been prepared immediately after the return of the traveller, for the Friar Salimbene di Adam, who met him in France in the year of his return (1247), gave some interesting particulars. For a long time the work was but partially known, and that chiefly through an abridgment in the compilation of Vincent of Beauvais (Speculum Historiale) made in the generation following the traveller's own, and printed first in 1473. Richard Hakluyt (1598) and Bergeron (1634) published portions of the original work; but the complete and genuine text was not printed till 1838, when it was published by Armand d'Avezac, in the 4th volume of the Recueil de voyages et de mémoires of the Geographical Society of Paris. Carpine's companion Benedict also left a brief narrative taken down from his oral relation.

== Content ==
Like other well-known Medieval itineraries, Giovanni's Ystoria Mongalorum highlights an absence of a traveler's or author's egotism, and contains, even in the last chapter, scarcely any personal narrative. Giovanni was not only an old man when he went on this mission, but was, according to accidental evidence in the annals of his order, a fat and heavy man (vir gravis et corpulentus), insomuch that, contrary to Franciscan precedent, he rode a donkey between his preachings in Germany.

The book first revealed the Mongol world to Catholic Christendom. He provided four lists: of nations conquered by the Mongols, nations that had (as of 1245–1247) successfully resisted the Mongol princes, and witnesses to his narrative, including various Kiev merchants.

Giovanni recorded the information he collected in a work, variously entitled in the manuscripts, Ystoria Mongalorum quos nos Tartaros appellamus ("History of the Mongols, which we call Tartars"), and Liber Tartarorum, or Liber Tatarorum ("Book of the Tartars [or Tatars]"). This treatise has nine chapters. The first eight describe the Tartar's country, climate, manners, religion, character, history, policy, and tactics, and on the best way to oppose them. The ninth chapter describes regions he passed through.

=== Chapters ===
==== Prologue ====
The Prologue identifies the main audience of Giovanni's account as "all the faithful of Christ." The Prologue explains that Giovanni has been sent to the land of the Tartars by the Pope so "if by chance they [the Tartars] made a sudden attack they would not find the Christian people unprepared." Giovanni traveled "during a year and four months and more" with Friar Benedict the Pole "who was our [Giovanni's crew] companion in our tribulations and our interpreter."

==== Chapter I ====
The Land of the Tartars, its Position, Physical Features and Climate

In this chapter, Giovanni discusses the physical features and climate of Mongolia. Beginning with describing the geographical qualities of the land, where it changes abruptly from mountainous to plains, sparsely populated with trees. Likewise, Giovanni focuses on the lack of agricultural land in Mongolia, highlighting how the Tartars are forced to rely on raising cattle for sustenance as, "Not one hundredth part of the land is fertile." Following his description of the Mongolian landscape, Giovanni addresses the irregularity and dangers of the climate of Mongolia, noting that the immense lighting and thunder storms, hurricanes, and bitter cold wreaked havoc on his men, causing many to lose their lives.

==== Chapter II ====
Of their Persons, their Clothes, their Dwelling-Places, Possessions and Marriage

In the second chapter, Giovanni turns his attention to the Tartars themselves. Focusing his attention in dividing his manuscript into five sections in order to efficiently describe the Tartars. Beginning with the physical description of the male Tartars specifically, without any mention of the physical characteristic of Tartar women. Giovanni began highlighting the unique physical structure of the Tartars' faces, cheekbones, and their stature. Likewise, Giovanni spends a significant portion of the physical description of the Tartar focused on their lack of beards and their attention to detail when shaving their heads, comparing their grooming to that of clerics. Following the description of the physicality of the Tartars, Giovanni began to focus on the Tartars concepts and traditions involving marriage. Focusing on the vast harem of wives that "each man was allowed to have as many wives as he can keep, one hundred, another fifty, another ten--one more, another less." Giovanni also focused on the normalcy surrounding potentially incestuous marriages within the Tartars. The only restraint to whom the Tarter men would marry, was any women born from his mother, they were not permitted to marry. According to Giovanni, if the women shared the same father as their potential suitor, they would have been permitted to marry. Following from his segment about Tartar Marriages, Giovanni began discussing the unique attire of Tartar people.

==== Chapter III ====
Of their Worship of God, those things which they Consider to be Sins, Divinations and Purifications, Funeral Rites, etc.

In this chapter, Giovanni recounts the Tartars religion and their practices. He began his description of their religion by emphasising that the Tartars do in fact believe in the Catholic God, but that their loyalty is not solely to God, as they still pray to idols. Likewise, the idols that the Tartars pray to are constructed out of felt, silk and other softer materials in order to resemble that of an udder and of a man.

==== Chapter IV ====
Of their Character, Good and Bad, their Customs, Food, etc.

In this chapter, Giovanni focuses on the character of the Tartars, highlighting their utmost discipline as he recounts "Fights, brawls, wounding, murder are never met among them. Nor are robbers and thieves who steal on a large scale found there." Their disciplined behavior and rather humble living accommodations are attractive to Giovanni who practices living very humbly as part of being a friar from the Franciscan order.

==== Chapter V ====
The Beginning of the Empire of the Tartars and their Chief Men, and the Dominion Exercised by the Emperor and the Princes

In this chapter, Giovanni focuses on documenting the history of the Mongol Empire and the Tartars. Beginning with describing the four tribes that inhabit the land of Mongolia; Yekamongol, Su-Mongol/Tartars, Merkit, and Mecrit. Likewise, Giovanni spends much of the text in describing the tribe of the Yekamongol, or the 'Great Mongols,' highlighting their powerful leader Chingis who managed to conquer the other three tribes in a massive battle which caught the eye of the Naimans who were aggravated by the "arrogance of Chingis." After which, Giovanni focuses on where he examines the battles with the Naimans and the Karakitayans, and centering on the growing strength of Chingis Chan and his empire.

==== Chapter VI ====
Of War, their Battle Array, Arms, their Cunning in Engagements, Cruelty to Captives, Assault on Fortifications, their Bad Faith with those who Surrender to them, etc.

In this chapter, Giovanni focuses on the militaristic disciplines and tactics of the Tartars. Beginning with a description of how the Tartar forces are organized into groups of tens and their tactics to maintain authority over large groups of people. Then Giovanni focuses on the techniques of the tartar military in enforcing that their soldiers do not desert their position during war. Emphasising that the survival of troops in battle relied on the cooperation of each other. In order to survive, each battalion must move as a group and not individually as "if one or two or three or even more out of a group of ten run away, all are put to death; and if a whole group of ten flees, the rest of the group of a hundred are all put to death, if they do not flee too."

==== Chapter VII ====
How they Make Peace, the Names of the Countries they have Conquered, the Tyranny they Exercise over the Inhabitants, and the Countries which have Manfully Resisted them

In this chapter, Giovanni focuses on the aftermath of war for the nations or people conquered by the Tartars. Giovanni begins by establishing the ultimate goal of the conquered people is subjection to the whim of the Tartars. Likewise, the demands of the Tartars is their military loyalty. Fighting alongside the Tartars in any war they see fit regardless of their previous alliances with different nations. Likewise, the conquered nations were required to hand over a tenth of everything, not just riches and other possessions but the men, women, and children to be enslaved by the Tartars.

==== Chapter VIII ====
How to Wage War against the Tartars; the Intentions of the Tartars; Arms and Army Organisations, how to Meet their Cunning in Battle, the Fortification of Camps and Cities, and what should be Done with Tartar Prisoners

In this chapter, Giovanni focuses on the intentions of the Tartars and how the Pope and other European powers should respond to any future threats by the Tartars. Furthermore, Giovanni further emphasizes the threat that the Tartars placed on Eastern European nations but subsequently the entire world, "It is the intention of the Tartars to bring the whole world into subjection if they can." Likewise, Giovanni indirectly addresses the disunity of the provinces of Italy and other European nations. Focusing on the fact that each of the provinces will need to be prepared to fight for one another or they will be vanquished.

==== Chapter IX ====
The Countries through which we Passed, their Position, the Witnesses we Came across, and the Court of the Emperor of the Tartars and his Princes

In this chapter, Giovanni focuses on his experiences of traveling to Mongolia as well as the Tartar Emperor and his Princes. Giovanni began by discussing the process of traveling to Mongolia, where he needed different decrees and written approval from monarchs of Russia and Bohemia as he crossed their borders.

==== Appendix ====
In this final chapter of the Ystoria Mongalorum, Giovanni adds the letter of Pope Innocent IV to the Emperor of the Tartars. The letter emphasises the Popes attempts to convert the Tartar emperor to Catholicism, unaware of the fact that the Tartars were largely aware of Catholicism and had members practicing it already alongside traditional Idols.

== Variations of the Ystoria Mongalorum ==
Two redactions of the Ystoria Mongalorum are known to exist: Giovanni's own and another. An abridgement of the first redaction can be found in the Turin National Library. The Tartar Relation is an expanded version of the second redaction. The standard Latin edition of Ystoria Mongalorum is credited to Anastasius Wyngaert, in Sinica Franciscana, vol. 1 (Quaracchi, 1929), pp. 3–130.

=== First-Redaction ===
Until the discovery of the ninth chapter in the Luxembourg manuscript, the only other manuscript containing the chapter was the Leyden manuscript. Furthermore, the discovery of another manuscript containing Giovanni's completed narrative of Mongolia emphasizes the sources the previous manuscripts relied on were incomplete. As Giovanni addressed the historiographical error in the end of the ninth chapter, “People however whom we came across on our journey in Poland, Bohemia, Germany and in Liege and Champagne wanted to have the above account and so they copied it before it was complete and even in a very abbreviated form, for we had not then had a quiet time when we could finish it completely.”

==== Manuscripts Referencing the First-Redaction ====
- S = Luxembourg, Bibliothèque Nationale, 110 IV, ff. 175r-187v, sec. XIII.
- T = Turin, National Library, lat. 1066, EV8 (L.IV.55), membranous, sec. XII/XIV, ff. 11rb-15rb.I
- R = Wroclaw, Biblioteka Zakladu Narodowego im. Ossolinskich, Rkp. 2044/II, paper, sec. XV, ff. 1r-21v.
- V= Vienna National Library, mss. no. 362.
- B= Vienna National Library, mss. no. 521.
- O = Oxford, Bodleyan Library, Digby 11, parchment, sec. XIV, ff. 62v-69r.
- W = Wien, Österreichische Nationalbibliothek, lat. 362, membranous, sec. XIV, ff. 27r-36r.
- L = London, British Library, Royal 13.A.XIV, parchment, 14th century, ff. 198r-213r.
- M = Metz, Bibliothèque Municipale, 651, parchment, sec. XV, ff. 110r-117v.
- P= Paris, Bibliothèque Nationale, Colbert no. 2477.

=== Second-Redaction ===
Further examination of the second Ystoria Mongalorum reveals that the uncertainty about identifying Giovanni's "final authorial version" from an unidentified author remains. As at least 32 edits were made to the text, with 9 having "substantively affected the meaning of the text," further complicates the narrative of his journey. Likewise, the main differences between the two sources are the alterations to the second edition's tone, point of view, and the content of the second source. The redactions to the Ystoria Mongalorum largely changed the text to support anti-Tartar perspectives, as highlighted in the Tartar Relations. Similarly, the change reflects "the apparent failure of his [Giovanni's] mission to reach an accommodation with them [Tartars]." Upon reading Giovanni's account of his return to Lyon in 1247, friars heavily criticized it because they doubted the authenticity of his claims regarding the Tartars. Likewise, in order to preserve his credibility, Giovanni further altered the narrative by adding evidence to his claims, "... with truth as guide, we have written everything that we have seen or heard from others whom we believe are to be trusted and, as God is witness, we have not knowingly added anything."

Giovanni's second redaction of Ystoria Mongalorum had not spread internationally until it was compiled and altered into Vincent de Beavais's Speculum Historiale in the late thirteenth century. Likewise, it was not until 1473 that printed editions of Ystoria Mongalorum became available. Similarly, Richard Hakluyt and Pierre Bergeron published parts of the original work in the later decades as well. The complete and authentic text was not printed until 1838, published by Armand d'Avezac, in the fourth volume of the Recueil de voyages et de mémoires of the Société de Geografía de Paris, alongside the short account by his traveling companion Benedictus, De Itinere Fratrum Minorum ad Tartaros.

==== Manuscripts Referencing the Second-Redaction ====
- C = Cambridge, Corpus Christi College, 181, parchment, sec. XII ex., ff. 279-320 (the sheets are numbered progressively on the front and back).
- D = Leiden, Bibliotheek der Rijksuniversiteit, 104, parchment, sec. XIV, ff. 144v-164r.
- W = Wolfenbüttel, Herzog-August-Bibliothek, 41-Weiss. (4125), membranous, sec. XIV, ff. 236r-253r.

=== Tartar-Relations ===
The Tartar-Relations by George d. Painter, is a heavily revised version of the second redaction of Giovanni's Ystoria Mongalorum. Likewise, this source heavily relies on information from Giovanni, and other travelers in the mid-thirteenth-century with elements from the imagination.

==== Manuscripts Referencing the Tartar Relations ====
- Y= Yale, Wittan, ms.
