= Of Kiev =

Toponymic epithet

Of Kiev is a toponymic epithet associated the town of Kiev. Notable people with this epithet include:

== Rulers and other royalty ==
=== Men ===
- Princess Bagrationi of Kiev
- Fyodor of Kiev
- George I of Kiev (Yuri Dolgorukiy)
- Gleb of Kiev
- Igor of Kiev, ruler of Kievan Rus' from 913 to 945
- Igor II of Kiev (died 1147), Grand Prince of Kiev (1146)
- Iziaslav I of Kiev (1024–1078), patronymic Yaroslavich
- Iziaslav II of Kiev (1096–1154), patronymic Mstislavich
- Iziaslav III of Kiev (died 1162), patronymic Davidovich
- Iziaslav IV of Kiev (born 1186)
- Kirill II of Kiev
- Mikhail of Vladimir, first grand prince of Kiev named Michael, reigned briefly in 1171
- Michael of Chernigov, 2nd grand prince of Kiev named Michael, reigned 1238–1239 & anew 1241–1246, executed by Mongols, glorified as a Saint
- Mstislav I of Kiev (1076—1132)
- Mstislav II of Kiev (died 1172)
- Mstislav III of Kiev (died 1223)
- Oleg of Kiev
- Roman I of Kiev
- Roman II of Kiev
- Rostislav I of Kiev (c.1110-1167)
- Rostislav II of Kiev (1173 - before 1214)
- Rostislav III of Kiev (1225-62), Ban of Slavonia and Machva
- Rurik II of Kiev
- Sviatopolk I of Kiev
- Sviatopolk II of Kiev
- Sviatoslav I (c. 942–972)
- Sviatoslav II of Kiev (1027–1076)
- Sviatoslav III of Kiev (died 1194)
- Viacheslav I of Kiev
- Vladimir of Kiev
- Vladimir Monomakh of Kiev
- Vladimir III of Kiev
- Vladimir IV of Kiev
- Vseslav of Kiev
- Vsevolod I of Kiev
- Vsevolod II of Kiev
- Vsevolod III of Kiev
- Vsevolod IV of Kiev
- Yaropolk I of Kiev
- Yaropolk II of Kiev
- Yaroslav I of Kiev
- Yaroslav II of Kiev
- Yaroslav III of Kiev
- Yuri II of Kiev

=== Women ===
- Agrippina of Kiev
- Anastasia of Kiev
- Anna Vsevolodovna of Kiev
- Anna II of Kiev
- Anne of Kiev
- Christina of Kiev
- Dobrodeia of Kiev
- Elisiv of Kiev
- Eudoxia of Kiev
- Evdochia of Kiev
- Euphemia of Kiev
- Eupraxia of Kiev
- Euphrosyne of Kiev
- Ingeborg of Kiev
- Irina of Kiev
- Isidore of Kiev
- Malmfred of Kiev
- Maria Dobroniega of Kiev
- Maria Mstislavna of Kiev
- Olava, Grand Princess of Kiev
- Olga of Kiev
- Predslava of Kiev
- Predslava, Grand Princess of Kiev
- Sophia of Kiev (c. 1405–1461)
- Verkhuslava of Kiev
- Wyszesława of Kiev
- Zbyslava of Kiev

== Clergy ==
- Abraham of Kiev
- Alexius of Kiev, Metropolitan of Kiev and all Rus'
- Anthony of Kiev ( 983 – 1073), a monk in Kievan Rus, a cofounder of Kyiv Pechersk Lavra
- Anthony (Khrapovitsky) of Kiev
- Barlaam of Kiev
- Cyprian of Kiev, Metropolitan of Kiev, Rus' and Lithuania
- Daniel of Kiev a.k.a. Daniel the Traveller, monk, travel writer
- Dionysius, Metropolitan of Kiev
- George of Kiev
- Helladius of Kiev
- Hilarion of Kiev
- Maximos, Metropolitan of Kiev
- Metropolitan Michael I of Kiev
- Nicephorus II of Kiev
- Peter of Moscow, or Peter of Kiev, metropolitan of Kiev
- Pimen, Metropolitan of Kiev
- Simeon of Kiev
- Sylvester of Kiev
- Theodosius of Kiev
- Theognostus of Kiev, Metropolitan of Kiev and all Rus'

== Other ==
- Moses of Kiev

== See also ==
- Grand Prince of Kiev
- List of princesses and grand princesses consort of Kiev
