= List of wars involving Kievan Rus' =

This is a list of wars involving Kievan Rus' (c. 9th century–1240). (Note: The timespan of Kievan Rus' is generally dated from c. 880 to 1240, but its precise origins are shrouded in mystery, influenced by later distortions, and the subject of modern scholarly dispute. Because 'no adequate system of succession to the Kyivan throne was developed' after the death of Yaroslav the Wise (r. 1019–1054), a process of gradual political disintegration would commence. The Mongol siege and sack of Kiev in 1240 is generally held to mark the end of Kievan Rus'. Modern historians from Belarus, Russia, and Ukraine alike consider Kievan Rus' the first period of their modern countries' histories.) These wars involved Kievan Rus' (also known as Kyivan Rus') as a whole, or some of its principalities (Note: Principalities of Kievan Rus' between the 9th century and 1240 included Kiev (Kyiv), Beloozero, Chernigov (Chernihiv), Drutsk, Halych (Galicia), Jersika, Koknese, Murom, the Novgorod Republic, Novgorod-Seversk (Novhorod-Siversk), Peremyshl (Przemyśl), Pereyaslavl (Pereiaslav), Polotsk (Polatsk), Ryazan (Riazan), Terebovlia, Turov and Pinsk (Turau-Pinsk, Turovian Rus'), Vladimir-Suzdal (Rostov, Suzdalia), Volhynia (Volyn, Volodymyr), and Yaroslavl. Halych and Volhynia would be unified in 1199, and raised to the Kingdom of Galicia–Volhynia (Ruthenia) in 1253, but lost the (mostly destroyed) city of Kiev in 1240 to the Golden Horde. Pskov Land (Pleskov) was formally part of the Novgorod Republic before 1240, but eventually became the independent Pskov Republic in 1348. Vladimir-Suzdalia would fragment into several smaller principalities after 1240, such as Tver (1246), Moscow (Muscovy; 1263), and Novgorod-Suzdal (1341).) up to 1240. (Note: After the Mongol invasion of Kievan Rus' of 1237–1241 (including the 1240 sack of Kiev which ended Kievan Rus'), most of the surviving Rus' principalities (exceptions included the Novgorod Republic) were forced to pay tribute and homage to Batu Khan (residing in Sarai on the Volga) of the newly-established Mongol-Tatar Golden Horde.)

Victory of Kievan Rus' (and allies)
Defeat of Kievan Rus' (and allies)
Another result*

*e.g. result unknown or indecisive/inconclusive, result of internal conflict inside Kievan Rus', status quo ante bellum, or a treaty or peace without a clear result.

Date	Conflict	Combatant 1	Combatant 2	Result
830s	Paphlagonian expedition of the Rus'	Rus' Khaganate	Byzantine Empire	Unclear. The historicity of this conflict is questioned
860	Rus'–Byzantine War (860)	Rus' Khaganate	Byzantine Empire	Victory. The historicity of this conflict is questioned
c. 880s, c. 913, 943, 965, c. 1041 (Note: 'Sometime during the reign of Hasan Ibn Zaid, ruler of Tabaristan (r. 864–884), the Rus sailed into the Caspian Sea and unsuccessfully attacked the eastern shore at Abaskun. This was probably a raid on very small scale (...) Great raids, however, took place in c. 913, in 943, in 965 and in c. 1041.')	Caspian expeditions of the Rus'	Kievan Rus'	Southern Caspian coastal regions	Unclear
907	Rus'–Byzantine War (907)	Kievan Rus'	Byzantine Empire	Victory
920–1036	Rus'–Pecheneg wars: Siege of Kiev (968)	Kievan Rus'	Pechenegs	Victory: After the Battle of Kiev in 1036, the Pechenegs stopped raiding Rus'
941	Rus'–Byzantine War (941)	Kievan Rus'	Byzantine Empire	Defeat
944/945	Rus'-Byzantine War (944/945)	Kievan Rus'	Byzantine Empire	Victory. The historicity of this conflict is questioned. (Note: Cross & Sherbowitz-Wetzor (1953): 'Practically all modern investigators consider Igor's second expedition unhistorical, e.g., Shakhmatov, Razÿskaniya, p. 395: "Igor's expedition of 944 after the attack of 941 appears clearly as invented to cover up the inglorious event of which the annalist learned from the continuator of Hamartolus." So also Hrushevsky, Istoriya Ukrainy-Rusi, I (Kiev, 1913), p. 442-ff; and Laehr, op. cit., pp. 101-103. Vasiliev, however, Hist., p. 322, accepts the chronicle account. (...)')
945–947	Olga's Revenge on the Drevlians	Kievan Rus': Olga of Kiev	Drevlians	Olga victory. The historicity of this conflict is questioned
965–969	Khazar campaign of Svyatoslav	Kievan Rus'	Khazar Khaganate	Victory: Destruction of the Khazar Khaganate
967/968–971	Sviatoslav's invasion of Bulgaria	Kievan Rus'	Byzantine Empire	Defeat: Byzantine victory
c. 972–980	Feud of the Sviatoslavichi: Casus belli: death of Sviatoslav I of Kiev	Kievan Rus': Kiev (Yaropolk I †); Polotsk (Rogvolod †)	Kievan Rus': Drevlians (Oleg of Drelinia †); Novgorod (Volodimer)	Volodimer victory
c. 981	Polish campaign of Volodimer I	Kievan Rus' (Volodimer I of Kiev)	Duchy of Poland (Mieszko I?)	Victory: Cherven Cities incorporated into Kievan Rus'
985	Volodimer I of Kiev's campaign against Volga Bulgaria	Kievan Rus'	Volga Bulgaria	Military victory, then agreement
987–989	Rebellion of Bardas Phokas the Younger	(Byzantine Empire) Byzantine emperor Basil II; Kievan Rus'	(Byzantine Empire) Bardas Phokas the Younger	Agreement: Rus'–Byzantine marriage alliance; Baptism of Volodimer I of Kiev; Further Christianization of Kievan Rus'
1015–1019	Kievan succession crisis of 1015–1019 (also known as Feud of the Volodimerovichi or Internecine war in Rus'): Bolesław I's intervention in the Kievan succession crisis (June–Sept. 1018)	Kievan Rus' loyal to Svyatopolk I Duchy of Poland (1018); Kingdom of Hungary (1018)	Kievan Rus' loyal to Yaroslav I	Yaroslav victory
1022	Yaroslav the Wise's attack on Brest	Kievan Rus'	Duchy of Poland	Defeat
1024	Battle of Listven	Kievan Rus'; Yaroslav the Wise	Principality of Chernigov; Mstislav of Chernigov	Chernigovian victory
1024	Rus'–Byzantine War (1024)	Kievan Rus'	Byzantine Empire	Defeat
1030	Yaroslav the Wise's campaign against the Chud	Kievan Rus'	Chud	Victory: Estonian tribes start paying tribute to Kievan Rus'
1030–1031	Yaroslav the Wise's campaign for the Cherven Cities	Kievan Rus'	Duchy of Poland	Victory
1031-1034	Kievan Rus' Attacks On Baku (1031-1034)	Kievan Rus'	Shaddadids	Defeat
c. 1038–1047	Miecław's Rebellion	Duchy of Poland; Kievan Rus'	Miecław's State; Duchy of Pomerelia; Yotvingians	Polish victory
1042–1228	Finnish–Novgorodian wars	Kievan Rus' (until 1136): Novgorod Republic	Yem people	Various results, mostly victories: The wars' effect on the Finns' society contributed to the eventual Swedish conquest of western Finland circa 1249
1043	Rus'–Byzantine War (1043)	Kievan Rus'	Byzantine Empire	Defeat
c. 1054–1238	Rus'–Cuman wars: Battle of the Alta River; Battle of Snovsk	Kievan Rus'	Cuman–Kipchak Confederation	Mixed results, mostly Kievan Rus' victories
1065–1069	Rebellion of Vseslav of Polotsk: Sieges of Pskov and Novgorod (1065–1067); Battle on the Nemiga River (1067); Kiev uprising of 1068; Polish intervention, restoration of Iziaslav I of Kiev (1069)	Principality of Kiev; Principality of Chernigov; Principality of Pereyaslavl; Kingdom of Poland (1069)	Principality of Polotsk	Allied victory: Principality of Polotsk is defeated (1067); Vseslav briefly reigned in Kiev (1068–May 1069); Restoration of Iziaslav I of Kiev (May 1069)
1074	Bolesław II the Generous's raid on Kievan Rus'	Kievan Rus'	Kingdom of Poland	Defeat
1076	Bolesław II the Generous's raid on Bohemia	Kingdom of Poland Kievan Rus'	Duchy of Bohemia	Polish–Kievan victory
1076–1077	Kievan succession crisis: Casus belli: death of Sviatoslav Yaroslavich (26 December 1076); Vsevolod besieged Iziaslav in Volyn (1077); Boris Sviatoslavich captured Chernigov, but Vsevolod ousted him (May 1077); Iziaslav recovered Kiev with Polish support (July 1077)	Iziaslav Yaroslavich; Kingdom of Poland Boris Sviatoslavich	Vsevolod Yaroslavich	Compromise: Iziaslav and Vsevolod concluded peace; Iziaslav recovered Kiev; Vsevolod retained Chernigov; Sons of Sviatoslav exiled to Tmutorakan
1078	Chernigov succession crisis: Sviatoslavichi and Cumans initially defeated Vsevolod; Battle of the Nizhatyn Field	Iziaslav Yaroslavich †; Yaropolk Iziaslavich; Vsevolod Yaroslavich; Vladimir Monomakh	Oleg Sviatoslavich; Boris Sviatoslavich; Cumans	Iziaslav–Vsevolod victory
1092	Kievan–Cuman raid on Poland	Kievan Rus'; Cuman–Kipchak Confederation	Kingdom of Poland	Kievan–Cuman victory
1093	Cuman invasion of Kievan Rus': Siege of Torchesk; Battle of the Stuhna River; Battle of the Zhelyan River	Kievan Rus'	Cuman–Kipchak Confederation	Defeat
1093–1097	Chernihiv war of succession (Note: The war broke out due to the death of Vsevolod I Yaroslavych, grand prince of Kyiv, and prince of Chernihiv and Pereyaslavl.)	Izyaslavychi: (Kievan Rus') Svyatopolk II Izyaslavych of Kyiv Monomakhi: Volodimer II of Pereyaslavl; Izyaslav Volodimirovych of Murom †	Svyatoslavychi: Oleh Svyatoslavych of Chernihiv; Davyd Svyatoslavych of Smolensk	Council of Liubech
1096–1116	Monomakh's campaign against the Cumans: Battle of Trubezh (1096); Battle of the Suten river (1103); Battle of the Salnitsa river (1111)	Kievan Rus'	Cuman–Kipchak Confederation	Victory
1097–1100	Internecine war in Rus' 1097–1100	Kievan Rus'; Kingdom of Hungary; Principality of Volhynia (until 1098)	Principality of Peremyshl; Zvenyhorod Principality; Principality of Terebovlya; Principality of Volhynia (from 1098)	Peremyshl victory
1101	Kievan–Cuman raid on Poland	Kievan Rus'; Cuman–Kipchak Confederation	Kingdom of Poland	Kievan–Cuman victory
1120	Kievan–Cuman raid on Poland	Kievan Rus'; Cuman–Kipchak Confederation	Kingdom of Poland	Kievan–Cuman victory
1132–1134	1132–1134 Pereyaslavl succession crisis: Casus belli: Pereyaslavl succession after death of Mstislav I Volodimerovich of Kiev; 1134 resumption: Viacheslav, given Pereyaslavl in 1132 compromise, left for Turov	Yaropolk II Volodimerovich of Kiev; Vsevolod Mstislavich of Pskov; Iziaslav Mstislavich of Volhynia	Yuri Dolgorukiy of Suzdalia Olgovichi of Chernigov	Compromise: Andrey Volodimerovich gained Pereyaslavl (1135); Monomakhovichi split into rival Mstislavichi and Yurievichi
c. 1132–1350	Swedish–Novgorodian Wars	Kievan Rus' (until 1136): Novgorod Republic	Kingdom of Sweden; Kingdom of Norway (from 1319)	Stalemate after Black Death
1139–1142	1139–1142 Kievan succession crisis: Casus belli: death of Yaropolk Volodimerovich II of Kiev	Viacheslav I of Kiev Yurievichi: Yuri Dolgorukiy of Rostov-Suzdal; Rostislav Yuryevich (r. Novgorod 1138–40, 41–42); Novgorod Republic (repeatedly switched sides)	Olgovichi of Chernigov Mstislavichi: Iziaslav Mstislavich of Volhynia; Sviatopolk Mstislavich of Pskov; Novgorod Republic (repeatedly switched sides)	Mixed results: Viacheslav lost Kiev and Pereyaslavl; Yurievichi of Suzdalia lost Novgorod; Olgovichi of Chernigov gained Kiev; Iziaslav Mstislavich of Volhynia gained Pereyaslavl; Sviatopolk Mstislavich of Pskov gained Novgorod
1146–1159	1146–1159 Kievan succession crisis (also known as Internecine war in Rus' 1146–1154): Casus belli: death of Vsevolod Olgovich II of Kiev	Iziaslavichi (senior Mstislavichi): Iziaslav of Volhynia (1146–54); Mstislav of Pereyaslavl; Novgorod Republic (1146–55; 57–58); Olgovichi of Chernigov	Rostislavichi (junior Mstislavichi): Rostislav of Smolensk; Yaroslav of Halych (1158); Novgorod Republic (1158–59); Yuri Dolgorukiy of Suzdalia (1146–57); Cuman allies (1147); Novgorod Republic (1155–57)	Mixed results: Olgovichi of Chernigov lost Kiev; Iziaslavichi of Volhynia lost Pereyaslavl and Novgorod; Rostislavichi of Smolensk gained Kiev and Novgorod; Yurievichi of Suzdalia gained Pereyaslavl
1147	Bolesław IV the Curly's raid on Old Prussians	Bolesław IV the Curly Kievan Rus'	Old Prussians	Bolesław IV the Curly's victory
1167–1169	1167–1169 Kievan succession crisis: Casus belli: death of Rostislav I of Kiev; Iziaslavichi of Volhynia gained control over Kiev and Novgorod (1167–1168); Sack of Kiev (1169) by a Rostislavichi–Yurievichi–Olgovichi coalition; Siege of Novgorod (1170)	Iziaslavichi of Volhynia: Principality of Kiev; Principality of Volhynia; Novgorod Republic	Andrey Bogolyubsky's coalition: Yurievichi of Suzdalia; Olgovichi of Chernigov; Rostislavichi of Smolensk	Coalition victory: Yurievichi gained control over Kiev (1169); Novgorodians & Iziaslavichi defeated coalition (1170); Novgorodians expelled the Iziaslavichi (1170); Yurievichi gained control over Novgorod (1171)
1171–1173	1171–1173 Kievan succession crisis: Casus belli: death of prince Gleb of Kiev; Siege of Vyshgorod (1173)	Kiev and allies: Rostislavichi of Smolensk; Iziaslavichi of Volhynia; Principality of Galicia?; Olgovichi of Chernigov (joined Kiev near end)	Andrey's second coalition: Yurievichi of Suzdalia; Novgorod Republic; various other princes; Olgovichi of Chernigov (defected to Kiev near end)	Kiev & Rostislavichi victory: Andrey's coalition defeated; Yurievichi lost power; Andrey murdered by own boyars (1174)
1174–1177	1174–1177 Suzdalian war of succession: Casus belli: murder of prince Andrey Bogolyubsky of Vladimir-Suzdal	Yurievichi of Suzdalia	Yurievichi of Suzdalia	Vsevolod the Big Nest's victory
1187	Ruthenian raid on Lesser Poland	Principality of Halych	Casimir II the Just	Victory
1188–1189	Béla III's military campaign against Halych	Principality of Halych	Kingdom of Hungary	Defeat
1189	Casimir II the Just's raid on Halych	Kingdom of Hungary Principality of Halych	Casimir II the Just	Defeat
1195–1196	Internecine war in Rus' 1195–1196: Casus belli: death of Sviatoslav III of Kiev	Olgovichi	Monomakhovichi	Indecisive
1203–1234	Campaigns of Rus' princes against the Livonian Brothers of the Sword (see also Livonian Crusade)	Kievan Rus': Vladimir-Suzdal; Principality of Polotsk; Principality of Smolensk; Novgorod Republic; Grand Duchy of Lithuania; Baltic peoples Baltic Finnic peoples	Livonian Brothers of the Sword: Baltic Germans	Defeat: The crusaders captured Baltic lands up to the borders of Kievan Rus' and Lithuania
1205	Roman the Great's raid on Poland: Battle of Zawichost	Principality of Galicia–Volhynia	Leszek I the White	Defeat. Death of Roman the Great.
1206–1210	Internecine war in Rus' 1206–1210	Principality of Chernigov; Principality of Turov; Cumans; Principality of Ryazan (until 1207); Principality of Galicia-Volhynia (since 1206); Principality of Pereyaslavl (since 1206); Vladimir-Suzdal (since 1209)	Principality of Smolensk; Novgorod Republic; Kingdom of Hungary; Vladimir-Suzdal (until 1209); Principality of Ryazan (from 1207); Kingdom of Poland (from 1208); Principality of Volhynia (from 1208)	Mixed results: Olgovichi of Chernigov captured Kiev and Galicia; Yurievichi of Suzdalia captured Ryazan; Rostislavichi of Smolensk captured Novgorod
1207	Leszek I the White's raid on Rus'	Principality of Galicia–Volhynia	Leszek I the White Konrad I of Masovia	Defeat
1212–1216	Vladimir-Suzdal war of succession: Casus belli: death of Vsevolod the Big Nest	Konstantin of Rostov; Mstislav Mstislavich	Yuri II of Vladimir; Yaroslav II of Vladimir	Konstantin victory: Konstantin became Grand Prince of Vladimir
1213–1214, 1219, 1233–1234	Andrew II's military campaigns against Halych	Principality of Galicia–Volhynia	Kingdom of Hungary	Victory. Hungarian retreat.
1214	Leszek I the White's raid on Volodymyr-Volynskyi	Principality of Galicia–Volhynia	Leszek I the White Kingdom of Hungary	Defeat
1218–1221	Polish–Hungarian–Ruthenian War	Principality of Galicia–Volhynia	Leszek I the White Kingdom of Hungary	Victory
1223	Battle of the Kalka River (first Mongol invasion of Kievan Rus')	Principality of Kiev; Principality of Galicia–Volhynia; Principality of Chernigov; Principality of Smolensk Cuman–Kipchak Confederation	Mongol Empire; Brodnici	Crushing defeat: Armies of the Rus' principalities and Cumans mostly destroyed; Mongols plundered some towns and retreated east towards Volga Bulgaria, where they were defeated in the Battle of Samara Bend
1226	Chernihiv internecine war (1226)	Michael Vsevolodovych; Yuri Vsevolodovych; Vasylko Kostiantynovych; Vsevolod Kostiantynovych	Oleh of Kursk	Michael victory
1228–1236/40	Internecine war in Rus' 1228–1240: Casus belli: death of Mstyslav Mstyslavych Udatnyi	Principality of Volhynia; Principality of Kiev; Principality of Smolensk	Principality of Novgorod-Seversk; Cumania	Daniel of Galicia victory
1236–1237: 1236	War between Konrad I of Masovia and Galicia–Volhynia: Battle of Czerwień	Principality of Galicia–Volhynia	Konrad I of Masovia	Victory
1237–1241	Mongol invasion of Kievan Rus' (second) (see also List of battles of the Mongol invasion of Kievan Rus')	Kievan Rus': Kiev; Galicia–Volhynia; Vladimir-Suzdal; Novgorod Republic; Smolensk; Turov and Pinsk; Chernigov; Ryazan; Pereyaslavl	Mongol Empire; Brodnici	Decisive defeat: Kievan Rus' destroyed; Most surviving Rus' principalities became vassals of the Mongol Golden Horde.

== See also ==
- Military of Kievan Rus'
- Armies of the Rus' principalities
- List of wars between Piast Poland and Kievan Rus'
- List of wars and battles involving Galicia–Volhynia
- List of wars involving the Novgorod Republic
- List of wars involving the Principality of Moscow
- List of wars involving the Principality of Tver
- List of wars and battles involving the Principality of Smolensk
- List of wars involving Belarus
- List of wars and battles involving the Golden Horde
- List of wars involving Lithuania
- List of wars involving Poland
- List of wars involving the Polish–Lithuanian Commonwealth
- List of wars involving Russia
- List of wars involving Ukraine

== Bibliography ==
=== Primary sources ===
- Cross, Samuel Hazzard; Sherbowitz-Wetzor, Olgerd P. (1953) [1930]. The Russian Primary Chronicle, Laurentian Text. Translated and edited by Samuel Hazzard Cross and Olgerd P. Sherbowitz-Wetzor (PDF). Cambridge, Massachusetts: The Mediaeval Academy of America. p. 325. (The first 50 pages are a scholarly introduction).

=== Literature ===
- Katchanovski, Ivan; Kohut, Zenon E.; Nesebio, Bohdan Y.; Yurkevich, Myroslav (2013). Historical Dictionary of Ukraine. Lanham, Maryland; Toronto; Plymouth: Scarecrow Press. p. 992. ISBN 9780810878471. Archived from the original on 23 April 2023.
- Kohn, George Childs (2013). Dictionary of Wars. Revised Edition. Londen/New York: Routledge. ISBN 9781135954949.
- Martin, Janet (1995). Medieval Russia, 980–1584. Cambridge: Cambridge University Press. p. 450. ISBN 9780521368322.
- Martin, Janet (2007). Medieval Russia: 980–1584. Second Edition. E-book. Cambridge: Cambridge University Press. ISBN 978-0-511-36800-4.
- Martin, Janet (2009b). "From Kiev to Muscovy: The Beginnings to 1450". In Freeze, Gregory (ed.). Russia: A History. Oxford: Oxford University Press. pp. 1–30. ISBN 978-0-19-150121-0. Archived from the original on 27 January 2023. (third edition)
- Logan, F. Donald (2005). The Vikings in History. Third edition. Abingdon: Routledge. p. 224. ISBN 9781136527166.
- Pelenski, Jaroslaw (1988). "The Contest for the "Kievan Succession" (1155–1175): The Religious-Ecclesiastical Dimension". Harvard Ukrainian Studies. 12/13: 761–780. JSTOR 41036344.
- Гумилев, Лев (2023). От Руси к России. Moscow: Москва. ISBN 978-5-17-153845-3.
- Paliy, Oleksandr (2017). Історія України [A History of Ukraine] (in Ukrainian). Kyiv: К.І.С. ISBN 978-617-684-166-1.
