= List of wars involving the Novgorod Republic =

This is a list of wars involving the Novgorod Republic (1136–1478), also known as Republic of Novgorod, centred around the city of Veliky Novgorod.

Victory of the Novgorod Republic (and allies)
Defeat of the Novgorod Republic (and allies)
Another result*

*e.g. result unknown or indecisive/inconclusive, result of internal conflict inside the Novgorod Republic, status quo ante bellum, or a treaty or peace without a clear result.

| Date | Conflict | Combatant 1 | Combatant 2 | Result |
|---|---|---|---|---|
| c. 1042–1228 | Finnish–Novgorodian wars | Novgorod Republic (Note: 1136 is generally recognised as the date when Veliky Novgorod became a republic, and the Prince of Novgorod became an elective office. Before then, Novgorod was a hereditary principality.) | Yem people | Mixed results (Note: Selart 2015 noted that the 1228 Novgorodian campaign against the Tavastians was a failure.) |
| 1139–1142 | 1139–1142 Kievan succession crisis: Casus belli: death of Yaropolk II | Viacheslav I of Kiev Yurievichi: Yuri Dolgorukiy of Rostov-Suzdal; Rostislav Yuryevich (r. Novgorod 1138–40, 41–42); Novgorod Republic (repeatedly switched sides) | Olgovichi of Chernigov Mstislavichi: Iziaslav Mstislavich of Volhynia; Sviatopolk Mstislavich of Pskov; Novgorod Republic (repeatedly switched sides) | Mixed results: Viacheslav lost Kiev and Pereyaslavl; Yurievichi of Suzdalia lost Novgorod; Olgovichi of Chernigov gained Kiev; Iziaslav Mstislavich of Volhynia gained Pereyaslavl; Sviatopolk Mstislavich of Pskov gained Novgorod |
| 12th–14th century | Vladimirian-Novgorodian wars: Battle of Mount Zhdanaya (1135) | Novgorod Republic | Vladimir-Suzdal | Mixed results |
| 1146–1159 | 1146–1159 Kievan succession crisis: 1148 Novgorodian–Mstislavichi punitive expedition against the Suzdalian town of Yaroslavl; 1149 Novgorodian–Suzdalian clash over control of the Novgorodian northern regions | Novgorod Republic (Mstislavichi) | Vladimir-Suzdal (Yurievichi) | Status quo ante bellum: Yurievichi prince elected (1155); Mstislavichi prince elected (1157) |
| 1169 | Siege of Novgorod (1170) (part of the 1167–1169 Kievan succession crisis) | Iziaslavichi of Volhynia: Principality of Volhynia; Novgorod Republic | Coalition: Yurievichi of Suzdalia; Rostislavichi of Smolensk | Iziaslavichi–Novgorodian military victory |
| 1171–1173 | 1171–1173 Kievan succession crisis: Casus belli: death of prince Gleb of Kiev; Siege of Vyshgorod (1173) | Kiev and allies: Rostislavichi of Smolensk; Iziaslavichi of Volhynia; Principality of Galicia?; Olgovichi of Chernigov (joined Kiev near end) | Andrey's second coalition: Yurievichi of Suzdalia; Novgorod Republic; various other princes; Olgovichi of Chernigov (defected to Kiev near end) | Kiev & Rostislavichi of Smolensk victory: Andrey's coalition defeated; Yurievichi lost power; Andrey murdered by own boyars (1174) |
| 1212–1216 | Vladimir-Suzdal war of succession: Battle of Lipitsa (1216) | Principality of Rostov (Konstantin); Novgorod Republic (Mstislav) | Principality of Vladimir (Yuri); Pereslavl-Zalessky (Yaroslav) | Rostovian–Novgorodian victory |
| c. 13th century | Some battles of the Livonian Crusade Novgorodian or Pskovian participation: Battle of Otepää (1217) (only Pskovians); Siege of Reval (late 1223); Siege of Tartu (1224); Battle of Saule (1236) (only Pskovians) | Novgorod Republic; Pskov Land various allies | various enemies | Mixed results |
| 1228–1240 | Internecine war in Rus' 1228–1240 | Novgorod Republic | | Unclear |
| July; 1240 | Battle of the Neva | Novgorod Republic | "Swedes" | Novgorodian victory Historicity contested; only found in late, legendary Rus' sources |
| Sept. 1240 | 1240 Izborsk and Pskov campaign | Pro-Suzdalian; Novgorodians and Pskovians City of Pskov | Teutonic Order; Livonian Order; Bishopric of Dorpat; Yaroslav Vladimirovich | Livonian–Dorpat–Vladimirovich victory: Yaroslav Vladimirovich became prince of Pskov, sharing power with the City of Pskov, the Bishop of Dorpat and the Livonian Order |
| 1240–1241 | 1240–1241 Votia campaign | civilians in Votia; civilians in Tesovo and Luga; Novgorod Republic | Teutonic Order; Livonian Order; Bishopric of Ösel–Wiek; Local Votian leaders | Novgorodian victory: Livonians occupied Votia, built castle in Koporye, imposed tribute; Bishopric of Ösel–Wiek and Teutonic Order divided Votia into fiefs; Novgorodians defeated Livonians; Livonians left Votia (1242) |
| April; 1242 | Battle on the Ice (Battle of Lake Peipus) | Novgorod Republic; Vladimir-Suzdal | Livonian Order; Bishopric of Dorpat (Medieval Denmark) Denmark | Novgorodian–Suzdalian victory |
| 1268 | Battle of Wesenberg (1268) | Novgorod Republic; Pskov Republic; Vladimir-Suzdal | Duchy of Estonia; Bishopric of Dorpat; Livonian Order | Disputed; (Note: Livonian victory; Novgorodian victory): Novgorodian-Pskovian retreat after battle; Livonians attacked Pskov soon after (1269) |
| 12th–14th century | Swedish–Novgorodian Wars: Battle of the Voronezhka (1164); Third Swedish Crusade (1293–1295); Swedish Crusade against Novgorod (1348–1351) | Novgorod Republic | Sweden | Mixed results |
| 1419 | Raid on the White Sea (1419) | Novgorod Republic | (Kingdom of Norway (872–1397)) Norway | Norwegian victory |
| 1445 | Novgorodian-Norwegian war | Novgorod Republic | (Kingdom of Norway (872–1397)) Norway | Norwegian victory |
| 1456, 1471, and 1477–1478 | Muscovite-Novgorodian Wars.: Battle of Staraya Russa (1456); Battle of Shelon (1471) | Novgorod Republic | Principality of Moscow | Muscovite victory: Moscow annexed the Novgorod Republic |

== See also ==
- Armies of the Rus' principalities
- List of wars involving Kievan Rus'
- List of wars and battles involving Galicia–Volhynia
- List of wars and battles involving the Golden Horde
- List of wars involving the Principality of Moscow
- List of wars involving the Polish–Lithuanian Commonwealth
- List of wars involving the Principality of Tver
- List of wars and battles involving the Principality of Smolensk
- Military of Kievan Rus'

== Bibliography ==
- Martin, Janet (2007). Medieval Russia: 980–1584. Second Edition. E-book. Cambridge: Cambridge University Press. ISBN 978-0-511-36800-4.
- Pelenski, Jaroslaw (1988). "The Contest for the "Kievan Succession" (1155–1175): The Religious-Ecclesiastical Dimension". Harvard Ukrainian Studies. 12/13: 761–780. JSTOR 41036344.
- Selart, Anti (2015). "Chapter 3: Livonia and Rus' in the 1230s and 1240s". Livonia, Rus' and the Baltic Crusades in the Thirteenth Century. Leiden/Boston: BRILL. pp. 127–170. doi:10.1163/9789004284753_005. ISBN 978-90-04-28475-3.
- Péderi, Tamás (2017). "The Role of Economy in the Early Wars of Novgorod". Specimina Nova Pars Prima Sectio Medaevalis. 9. University Library of Pécs: 123–134. doi:10.15170/spmnnv.2017.09.06. ISSN 1588-8002.
