= Prince of Pereyaslavl =

The Prince of Pereyaslavl (Ukrainian: Князь Переяславський) was the ruler of the Principality of Pereyaslavl, a lordship based on the city of Pereyaslavl on the Trubizh River, (Note: Not to be confused with Pereslavl-Zalessky (founded in 1152) on the river Trubezh, northeast of Moscow in Russia.) and straddling extensive territory to the east in what are now parts of Ukraine. It was situated on the southern frontier of Kievan Rus' and bordered the steppe.

== History ==
The origins of the principality and the city of Pereyaslavl' itself are uncertain, with the Primary Chronicle mentioning Pereyaslavl' already just before the Rus'–Byzantine Treaty (907) as a prosperous town within Kievan Rus'. (Note: In each of the Rus'–Byzantine treaties of 907, 911/912, and 944/945, there is a list of cities that are to receive tribute from the Greeks; Pereyaslavl' is always mentioned third, after Kiev and Chernigov. The 907 list: 'first Kiev, then Chernigov, Pereyaslavl', Polotsk, Rostov, Lyubech, and the other towns'. The 911/912 list: 'first the natives of Kiev, then those from Chernigov, Pereyaslavl', and the other cities'. The 944/945 list: 'first, those from Kiev, then those from Chernigov and Pereyaslavl'.' Some scholars who are proponents of the rota system theory also identify Pereyaslavl' as the third-ranking city of the realm, and the appanage given to the third-oldest son of Yaroslav, while the eldest received Kiev and the second Chernigov.) Yet, sub anno 993, the Chronicle claims that Vladimir the Great founded a town called Pereyaslavl' that year on the banks of the river Trubizh, a tributary of the Dnieper, south of Kiev and Chernigov. Either Pereyaslavl' was founded already, or Vladimir built a new city by the same name.

After the Battle of Listven (1024), Vladimir's sons divided the realm along the Dnieper: Yaroslav the Wise reigned the right (west) bank including Novgorod from Kiev, while the left (east) bank including Pereyaslavl' were the domain Mstislav of Chernigov. The status of Pereyaslavl' remained unclear until 1054, when Yaroslav identified it as a principality within Kievan Rus', and appointed his son Vsevolod Yaroslavich as its prince.

His brother Svyatoslav received Chernigov, while Smolensk went to Vyacheslav and Vladimir-in-Volhynia to Igor. This ladder of succession is related to the seniority order mentioned above. Vsevolod's appanage included the northern lands of Rostov and the lightly colonised northeast (see Vladimir-Suzdal).

The Primary Chronicle recorded that in 988, Vladimir had assigned the northern lands (later associated with Pereyaslavl) to Yaroslav.

The town was destroyed by the Mongols in March 1239, the first of the great Rus cities to fall. Certainly from the reign of Vsevolod Yaroslavich, the princes of Pereyaslavl held the principality of Rostov-Suzdal, which was heavily colonized by Slavs thereafter, a process which strengthened the region's power and independence, separating the two regions.

In 1132, Yaropolk became Grand Prince on his brother Mstislav's death, while the Monomashichi descended into general internecine conflict over the Pereyaslavl principality. Yaropolk appointed Vsevolod Mstislavich, prince of Novgorod, to the principality of Pereyaslavl – in this era designated heir to the Kievan throne – thus provoking Yaropolk's younger brother Yuri Dolgoruki, controller of Suzdal, into war. Yuri drove out Vsevolod, whom Yaropolk then replaced with Izyaslav. An agreement was reached by 1134 between Yuri and Yaropolk that their common brother Vyacheslav would take the throne of Pereyaslavl.

== List of princes of Pereyaslavl ==
- Vsevolod I, 1054–1093
- Rostislav I Vsevolodich 1076, d. 1093
- Vladimir I Vsevolodich Monomakh, 1076–1078
- Rostislav I Vsevolodich (again), 1078–1093
- Vladimir I Vsevolodich Monomakh (again), 1094–1113. Possession confirmed at the Council of Liubech (1097)
- Svyatoslav I Vladimirovich, d. 1114
- Yaropolk I, 1114–1132. During this period, the Principality of Pereyaslavl' 'began to be regarded as the seat of the heir apparent, the next prince of Kiev.'
- Vsevolod II Mstislavich, 1132 x 1134
- Izyaslav I Mstislavich, 1132 x 1134
- Vyacheslav I Vladimirovich, 1132–1134
- Andrey Vladimirovich, 1135–1141
- Vyacheslav I Vladimirovich (again), 1142
- Iziaslav II, 1143–1145
- Mstislav Izyaslavich, 1146–1149
- Rostislav II Yurevich, 1149–1151
- Mstislav Izyaslavich (again), 1151–1155
- Gleb Yurevich, 1155–1169
- Vladimir III Glebovich, appointed 1169, died 1187
- Yaroslav II Mstislavich ??
- Vsevolod III the Big Nest, ?–1206
- Vsevolod IV Svyatoslavich, 1206
- Rurik Rostislavich, 1206–?
- Vladimir IV Rurikovich, 1206–1213

== Bibliography ==
=== Primary sources ===
- Cross, Samuel Hazzard; Sherbowitz-Wetzor, Olgerd P. (1953) [1930]. The Russian Primary Chronicle, Laurentian Text. Translated and edited by Samuel Hazzard Cross and Olgerd P. Sherbowitz-Wetzor (PDF). Cambridge, Massachusetts: The Mediaeval Academy of America. p. 325. (The first 50 pages are a scholarly introduction).
  - Cross, Samuel Hazzard; Sherbowitz-Wetzor, Olgerd P. (2013) [1953]. SLA 218. Ukrainian Literature and Culture. Excerpts from The Rus' Primary Chronicle (Povest vremennykh let, PVL) (PDF). Toronto: Electronic Library of Ukrainian Literature, University of Toronto. p. 16. Archived from the original (PDF) on 30 May 2014.

=== Literature ===
- Franklin, Simon; Shepard, Jonathan (1996), The Emergence of Rus, 750-1200, Longman History of Russia, London & New York: Longman, ISBN 0-582-49091-X, OCLC 185370857
- Martin, Janet (1995), Medieval Russia, 970-1584, Cambridge Medieval Textbooks, Cambridge: Cambridge University Press, ISBN 0-521-36832-4, OCLC 185317829
  - Martin, Janet (2007). Medieval Russia: 980–1584. Second Edition. E-book. Cambridge: Cambridge University Press. ISBN 978-0-511-36800-4.
