= Ivan's Hundred =

Association of merchants in Novgorod

Ivan's Hundred (Russian: Иванское сто, romanized: Ivanskoye sto), also known as St. John's Hundred, was an association of merchants that existed in the 12th–15th centuries in the Novgorod Republic.

The association gathered around the Church of St. John the Forerunner (Russian: Церковь Иоанна на Опоках) in Novgorod. It consisted of merchants who traded wax wholesale. The starosty (heads) of Ivan's Hundred were permanent members of the Commerce Court of Novgorod and ruling council of the Novgorod Republic. They also took part in signing trade agreements. The rights and responsibilities of the members of Ivan's Hundred were stated in the so-called Charter (Устав) and Manuscript (Рукописание) of the prince Vsevolod Mstislavich. Each member had to pay an entrance fee of 50 grivnas of silver and additionally to give a bolt of Ypres cloth (from Flanders) to the tysyatsky. The tysyatsky arbitrated disputes between the members.
