= Prince of Turov =

The Prince of Turov was the kniaz, the ruler or sub-ruler, of the Rus' Principality of Turov, a lordship based on the city of Turov, now Turaŭ in Homiel Voblast, Belarus.

Although not mentioned in his Testament of 1054, the city of Turov was ruled by the descendants of Iziaslav Iaroslavich, Grand Prince of Kiev. It fell into the control of Vladimir Monomakh and the latter's son Mstislav Vladimirovich, who delegated control, until the Iaroslavichi regained control in 1157 in the person of Iurii Iaroslavich in 1157.

== List of princes of Turov ==
- Sviatopolk Vladimirovich, 980–1010
- under Grand Prince of Rus'

Iziaslavichi

- Iziaslav Iaroslavich, 1045–1054
- under Grand Prince of Rus'
- Iaropolk Piotr Iziaslavich, 1078–87
- to be filled
- Sviatopolk Iziaslavich, 1088–1093
- Viacheslav Iaropolkovich, 1094–1104/05

Monomakhs

- 'control of Grand Prince, 1105–1125
- Viacheslav Vladimirovich, 1125–1132
  - Mikhail Viacheslavich, 1129
- Vsevolod Mstislavich, 1132
- Iziaslav Vladimirovich, 1132–1134
- Viacheslav Vladimirovich (again), 1134–1142
- to be filled
- Viacheslav Vladimirovich (3rd time), 1142–1146
- Andrei Boguliubski, 1150–1151
- Boris Yurevich, 1155–1157

Iziaslavovichi (again)

- Iurii Iaroslavich, 1157–1166 x 1167
- Iurii Iaroslavich, 1157–1167
- Sviatopolk Iurievich, d. 1190
- Ivan Iurievich, 1167–1190
- Gleb Iurievich, 1190–1195
- Ivan Iurievich (again), 1195–1207
- Rostislav Glebovich, 1207–1228
- Mstislav Fedor Glebovich, 1228–1235/8
- to be filled or unknown
- Iurii Vladimirovich, d. 1292
- Dmitry Iurevich, 1292–?
- ?
- Daniil Dmitr'evich, ?–1366
