= Yaroslav II of Kiev =

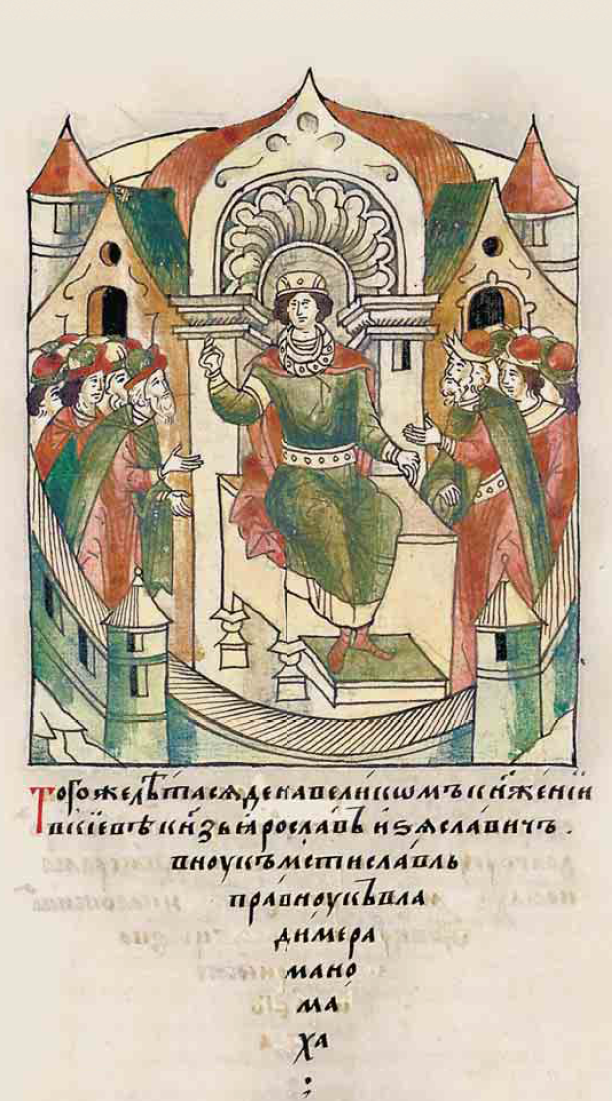
Miniature from the Illustrated Chronicle of Ivan the Terrible

Yaroslav II Iziaslavich (Note: Russian: Ярослав Изяславич; Ukrainian: Ярослав Ізяславич) (died 1180) was Prince of Turov (1146), Novgorod (1148–1154), Lutsk (1154–1180) and Grand Prince of Kiev (1174–1175; 1180). He was the son of Iziaslav II of Kiev and Agnes Hohenstaufen and the brother of Mstislav II of Kiev.

== Biography ==
After the murder of Andrey Bogolyubsky, Yaroslav's relatives managed to maneuver him into the Kievan throne. He contended with a senior relative, Sviatoslav Vsevolodivich, for over two years before Sviatoslav eventually won power for himself and became the uncontested ruler of Kiev.

== Family ==
He was married to Richeza, daughter Vladislaus II, King of Bohemia.

- Ingvar Yaroslavich (?-1220), prince of Lutsk (1180-1220), Grand Prince of Kiev (1201-1202, 1203, 1204)
- Vsevolod Yaroslavich (?-1209)
- Iziaslav Yaroslavich (?-1195)
- Mstislav the Mute (?-1226)
  - Ivan, prince of Lutsk and Chartoryisk

== Sources ==
- Martin, Janet L.B. Medieval Russia, 980-1584, 1995 (Cambridge Medieval Textbooks)

Yaroslav II of Kiev Izyaslavichi of Volhynia Born: ???? Died: 1180
Titles in pretence
Preceded by Sviatoslav III	Grand Prince of Kiev; 1174	Succeeded by Roman I
Preceded by Rurik	Grand Prince of Kiev; 1174–1175, 1180	Succeeded by Sviatoslav III
