= Boris Yurevich =

Prince of Bilhorod Kyivskyi (died 1159)

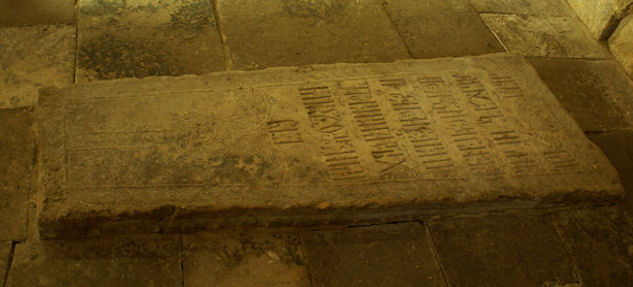
Boris Yurevich's tombstone in the Church of Saints Boris and Gleb

Boris Yurevich (Russian: Борис Юрьевич) was a son of Yuri Dolgorukiy and his first wife. He was kniaz of Belgorod Kievsky and Prince of Turov. He died in Suzdal on 2 May 1159 and was buried in the Church of Saints Boris and Gleb.
