= Vsevolod of Pskov =

Russian prince and saint

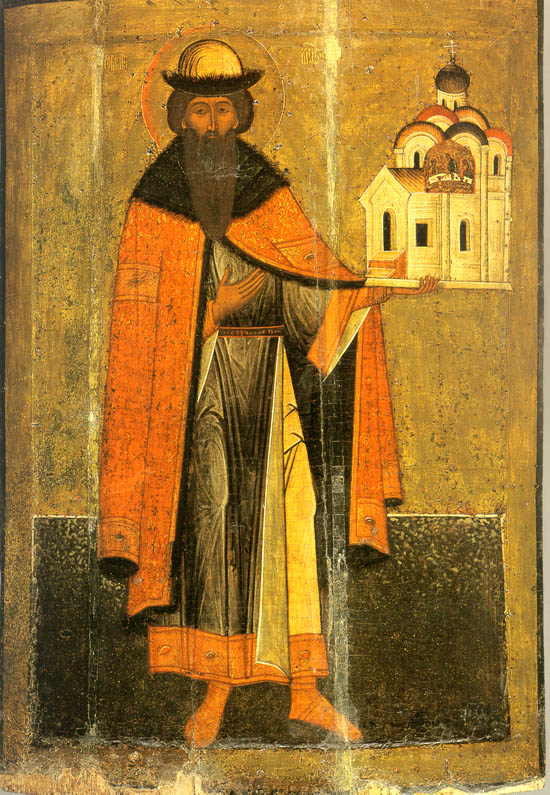
St. Gavriil of Pskov holding the Pskov cathedral in his hand.

Vsevolod Mstislavich Monomakh (Russian: Всеволод Мстиславич), the patron saint of the city of Pskov, ruled as Prince of Novgorod in 1117–32, Prince of Pereyaslavl (1132) and Prince of Pskov in 1137–38.

== Early life ==
The eldest son of Mstislav the Great and Christina Ingesdotter of Sweden, Vsevolod was born in Novgorod during his father's reign as prince there (1088–1093, 1095–1117) and given the baptismal name Gabriel, or Gavriil. His maternal grandfather was King Inge the Elder of Sweden. The date of his birth is unknown, although the idea has been advanced that the event was commemorated by the Annunciation Church in the Marketplace, founded by Mstislav in 1103.

He was enthroned as Prince of Novgorod after his father Mstislav Vladimirovich became Grand Prince of Kiev in 1117 and ruled Novgorod, with some interruption, until he was ousted by the Novgorodians in 1136. He was married to a Chernigovian princess in Novgorod in 1123 and his son, Ivan, was born there (he died in 1128). In 1123, Vsevolod led the Novgorodians against the Chud. These campaigns continued in 1130 and over the next several years. Aside from Vladimir Yaroslavich, Vsevolod was the first Novgorodian prince known to have been in conflict with Finns (in 1123).

== Expulsion from Novgorod ==
Following his father's death in 1132, support for him began to erode in Novgorod. That same year, he was sent by his uncle, Grand Prince Yaropolk, to Pereslavl, to reign there. When he tried to return to Novgorod later that year, the Novgorodians refused to accept him back because they considered his move to Pereslavl as a betrayal (He had sworn an oath to die in Novgorod). That being said, the chronicles indicate that he was back leading a Novgorodian army in 1133. It was during that campaign that Vsevolod captured the city of Yuryev (modern Tartu, Estonia).

In 1134, Vsevolod led an unsuccessful campaign in Vladimir-Suzdal during which, according to the Novgorodians, he showed indecisiveness, one of the reasons for his dismissal a little over a year later. On 28 May 1136, he was confined in the Archbishop's courtyard (compound) in the Detinets along with his wife and family, guarded by thirty men so as not to escape. In mid-July he was allowed to leave, going to his uncle in Kiev. The following year, he tried to come back to Novgorod at the head of an army but withdrew instead to Pskov, where he died in February 1138. According to his own wishes, he was buried in the Church of St. Demetrius in Pskov.

Vsevolod's dismissal from Novgorod has traditionally been seen as the end of Kievan power in the north and the beginning of the Republic of Novgorod. After him a number of princes were invited in or dismissed over the next two centuries, although only a few, like Aleksandr Nevsky, could assert themselves in the city for a prolonged period.

== Church-building and veneration ==
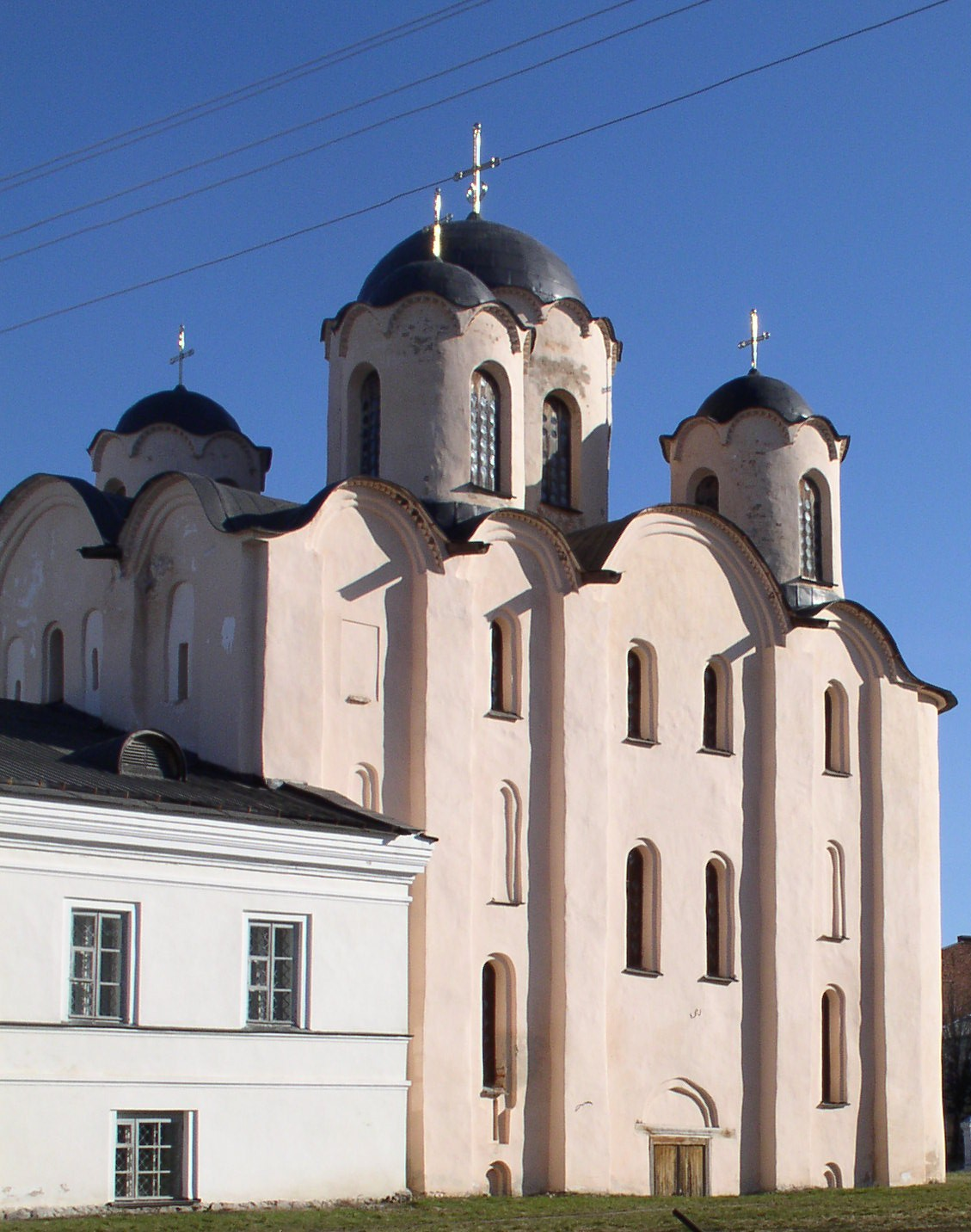
Cathedral of Saint Nicholas, constructed by Vsevolod in Novgorod.

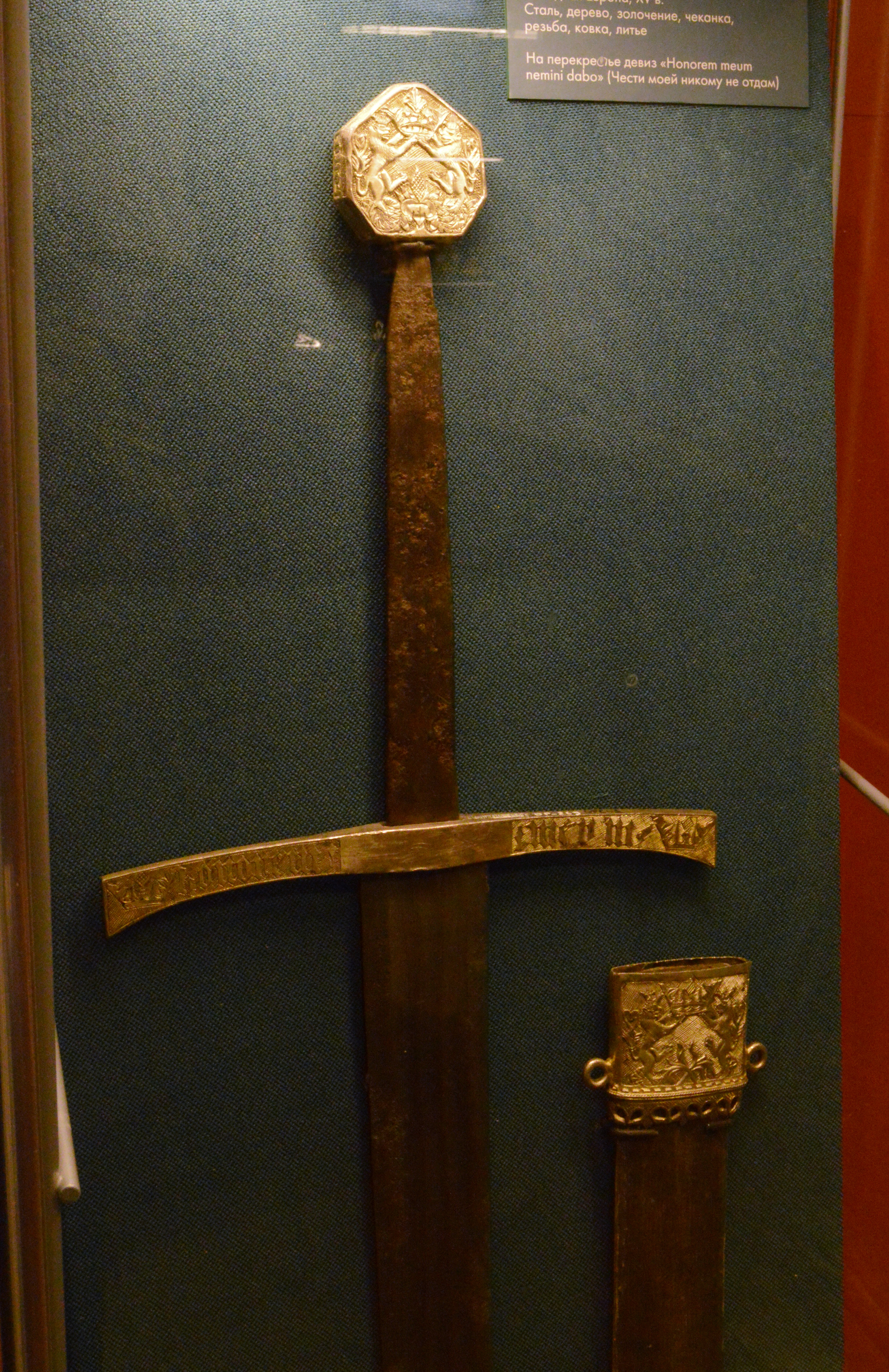
Sword attributed to Vsevolod.

In addition to leading Novgorodian armies on several campaigns, Vsevolod built a number of churches in and around the city: the Church of St. John on Opoki (1127–1130), the Church of St. George in the Market (1133), the Church of The Assumption in the Market (1133; built with Archbishop Nifont), and the Church of St. George in the Yuriev Monastery. It was Vsevolod who granted the charter to Ivan's Hundred, the first Russian merchant guild. In addition, the Cathedral of St. Nicholas in Yaroslav's Court, while often attributed to his father Mstislav, was mostly built during Vsevolod's tenure in Novgorod.

Vsevolod's comparatively early death prevented him from claiming the Kievan throne. He was survived by a daughter, Wierzchosława, the wife of Bolesław IV the Curly. The prince was canonized by the Russian Orthodox Church as Vsevolod-Gavriil. In the Stepennaya Kniga (the "Book of Degrees of Royal Genealogy"), he is listed as a Pskov Wonderworker. His relics were moved from the Church of St. Demetrius to the Trinity Cathedral in the Pskov Kremlin in 1193. The Pskovians attached his name to a German sword with the inscription honorem meum nemini dabo, formerly preserved in the cathedral sacristy, but modern historians date the sword to the 15th century at the earliest.

== Marriage and children ==
Married in 1123 in Novgorod to a Chernigovian princess being an unnamed daughter of Svyatoslav Davidovich

Issues

1. Ivan (died 1128)
2. Wierzchosława Wsewolodna (±1124 – 14 March ±1158), Married in 1137 Bolesław IV the Curly, High Duke of Poland

== Succession ==
Vsevolod Mstislavich Monomakhovichi Born: ± 1103 Died: February 1138
Regnal titles
Preceded by Mstislav Vladimirovich (second time)	Prince of Novgorod; 1117–1132	Succeeded by Sviatopolk Mstislavich
Preceded by Yaropolk Vladimirovich	Prince of Pereslavl; 1132	Succeeded by Iziaslav Mstislavich
Preceded by Viacheslav Vladimirovich	Prince of Turov; 1132	Succeeded by Iziaslav Mstislavich
Unknown	Prince of Pskov; 1137–1138	Unknown
Titles in pretence
Preceded by Mstislav Vladimirovich	Grand Prince of Kiev; 1125–1138	Succeeded by Izyaslav Mstislavich
