= Principality of Pereyaslavl =

Former country

Coordinates: 50°03′58″N 31°26′32″E

- 988–1239/1323
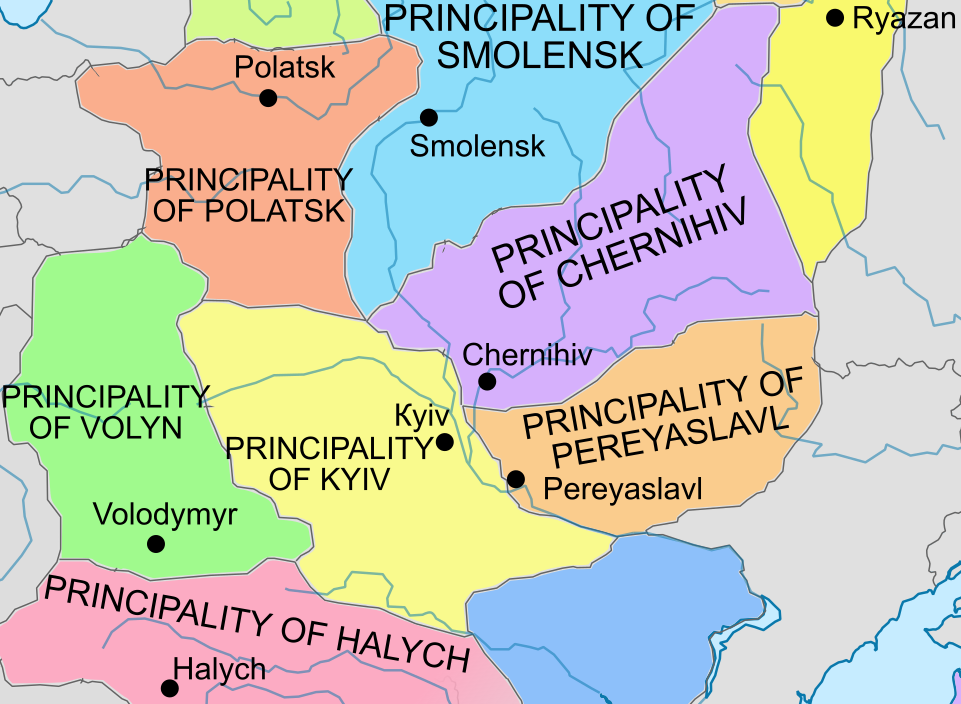
- Principality of Pereyaslavl (1132)
- Capital: Pereyaslavl
- Common languages: Old East Slavic
- Religion: Eastern Orthodoxy
- Government: Monarchy
- Prince
  - 988–1010: Yaroslav I the Wise (first)
  - 1206–1239: Vladimir IV Rurikovich (last)
- History
  - Established: 988
  - Disestablished: 1239/1323
- Currency: Grivna
- Today part of: Ukraine; Russia

The Principality of Pereyaslavl (Ukrainian: Переяславське князівство; Russian: Переяславское княжество) was a regional principality of Kievan Rus' from the end of 9th century until 1323, based in the city of Pereyaslavl (Note: Переяславль has also been transcribed as Pereyaslavl', Pereiaslavl', and other variations of romanising the Cyrillic ya (я), el (л), and soft sign (ь).) (now Pereiaslav) on the river Trubizh. (Note: Not to be confused with Pereslavl-Zalessky (founded in 1152) on the river Trubezh, northeast of Moscow in Russia. In historiography, Pereyaslavl' on the Trubizh has sometimes been called 'Pereiaslavl' Russkii' (that is, in the Rus' land around Kiev) in order to distinguish it from Pereslavl-Zalessky (that is, in the forest zone of Suzdalia).)

== Siting ==
The Principality of Pereyaslavl was usually administered by younger sons of the Grand Prince of Kiev. It stretched over the extensive territory from the left banks of the middle Dnieper river on the west to its eastern frontier that laid not far west from the Seversky Donets, where the legendary Cuman city of Sharuk(h)an was presumably situated.

== History ==
The Primary Chronicle dates the foundation of the city of Pereyaslavl' to 992; the archaeological evidence suggests it was founded not long after this date. In its early days Pereyaslavl' was one of the important cities in Kievan Rus' behind the Principality of Chernigov and Kiev. The city was located at a ford where Vladimir the Great fought a battle against the nomad Pechenegs.

The principality can be traced as a semi-independent dominion from the inheritance of the sons of Yaroslav the Wise, with Sviatoslav receiving Chernigov, Vsevolod getting Pereyaslavl, Smolensk going to Viacheslav, and Vladimir-in-Volhynia going to Igor. The Primary Chronicle records that in 988 Vladimir assigned the northern lands (later associated with Pereyaslavl) to Yaroslav.

Pereyaslavl was conquered and devastated by the Mongols in March 1239. It is unclear what happened after that, although it evidently became a tributary of the Golden Horde. Archaeological data suggests the territory of the city was abandoned some time after 1239, and remained uninhabited until the 15th century, when a small settlement appeared on the territory of the surrounding city.

The Galician–Volhynian Chronicle described under the year 1245 (6758) that prince Danylo of Halych sailed from Vydubychi Monastery (near Kyiv) on a boat to pay homage to Batu Khan in Sarai on the Lower Volga. On the way there, Danylo "arrived in Pereyaslavl' and there the Tatars met him." This has led some scholars to believe that there was a Tatar or Mongol garrison in Pereyaslavl, although the Chronicle does not say so. The text continues by saying: "From there he [Danylo] went to meet Kuremsa", who was dwelling together with other Tatars/Mongols in an unspecified location, but presumably beyond Pereyaslavl. The town is not mentioned again in that chronicle afterwards.

Early on during the Great Troubles, around 1360, grand duke Algirdas (Olgerd) of Lithuania acquired the core principalities of former Kievan Rus': Chernigov, Pereyaslavl, and Kiev.

== Gallery ==
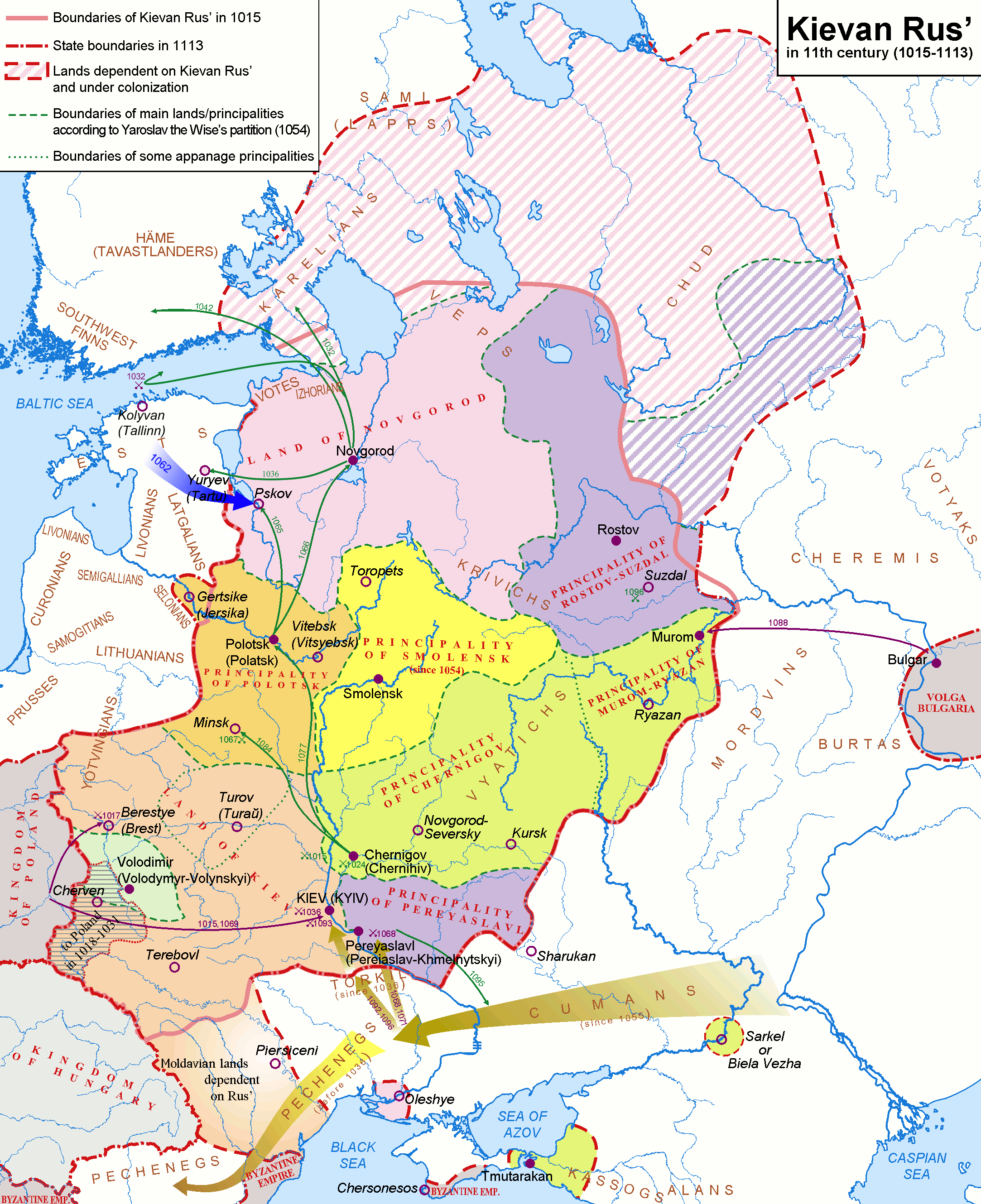
Principality of Pereyaslavl in c. 1100

Principality of Pereyaslavl (1132)

== See also ==
- Prince of Pereyaslavl, for list of rulers

== Bibliography ==
- Franklin, Simon; Shepard, Jonathan (1996), The Emergence of Rus, 750-1200, Longman History of Russia, London & New York: Longman, ISBN 0-582-49091-X
- Martin, Janet (1995), Medieval Russia, 970-1584, Cambridge Medieval Textbooks, Cambridge: Cambridge University Press, ISBN 0-521-36832-4
  - Martin, Janet (2007). Medieval Russia: 980–1584. Second Edition. E-book. Cambridge: Cambridge University Press. ISBN 978-0-511-36800-4.
- Liaskoronskyi, Vasyl (1897), Istoriya Pereyaslavskoy zemly s drevneyshykh vremen, Kyiv: Тип. И. И. Чоколова
- Kuchera, Mykhailo (1975), Drevnerusskye knyazhestva X-XIII st. / Pereyaslavskoe knyazhestvo (118—143), Moscow: Наука
