= Yaropolk II of Kiev =

Grand Prince of Kiev from 1132 to 1139

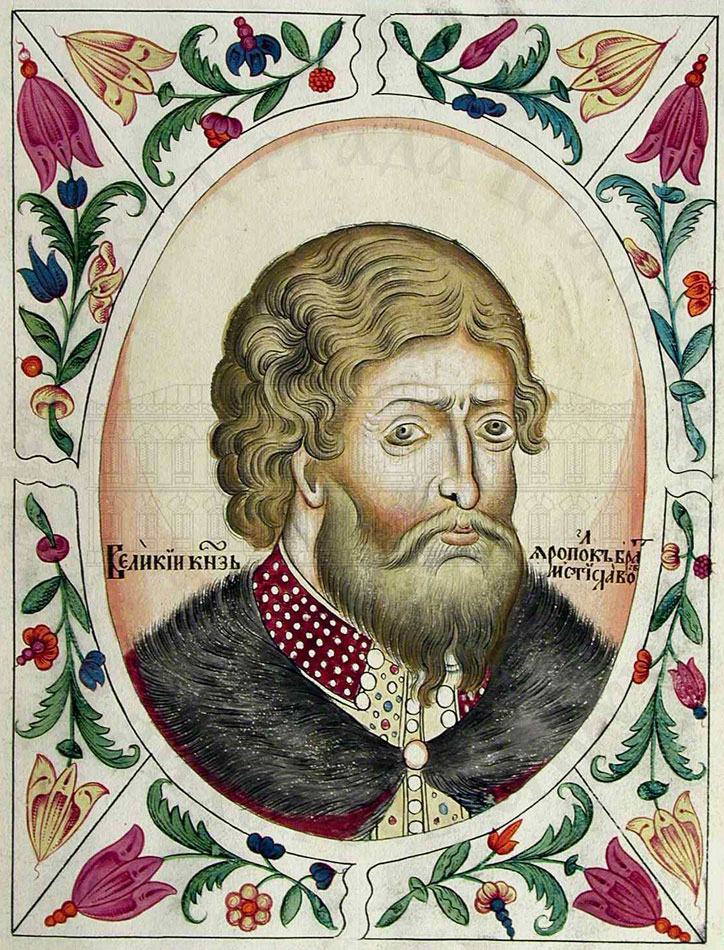
- Portrait in the Tsarsky titulyarnik (1672)

Prince of Smolensk
- Reign: 1100–1113

Prince of Pereyaslavl
- Reign: 1114–1132
- Predecessor: Sviatoslav I Vladimirovich
- Successor: Vsevolod Mstislavich

Grand Prince of Kiev
- Reign: 1132–1139
- Predecessor: Mstislav I of Kiev
- Successor: Viacheslav I of Kiev
- Born: 1082; Chernigov
- Died: 18 February 1139 (aged 56–57); Kiev
- Spouse: Helena
- Dynasty: Rurik
- Father: Vladimir II Monomakh
- Mother: Gytha of Wessex
- Religion: Eastern Orthodox Christianity

Yaropolk II Vladimirovich (Note: Russian: Ярополк II Владимирович; Ukrainian: Ярополк II Володимирович) (1082 – 18 February 1139) was Prince of Pereyaslavl (1114–1132) and Grand Prince of Kiev (1132–1139). He was a son of Vladimir II Monomakh and Gytha of Wessex. He fought in several campaigns against the Cumans, once in 1103 and again in 1116.

== Reign ==
After the death of his brother in 1132, Mstislav I the Great, Yaropolk received the crown of Kiev. Yaropolk had to deal with the many interests of his family, most of all his powerful half brother Yuri Dolgoruki. Yaropolk appointed Vsevolod Mstislavich to succeed him in Pereyaslavl but Yuri Dolgoruki, with the consent of the Novgorodians, soon drove out his nephew. Yaropolk appointed another son of Mstislav I: Iziaslav Mstislavich to Pereyaslavl, who also received Turov. He was replaced soon thereafter by Yaropolk's brother Viacheslav Vladimirovich.

The peace did not last long and in 1134 the merry-go-round started once more. Iziaslav had to transfer Turov to his uncle Viacheslav to let him rule the principality once again. Pereyaslavl would come to Yuri Dolgoruki on the condition that Iziaslav got to rule Rostov although Yuri kept a large part of the principality under his influence. Iziaslav also got to rule Volyn and another half brother of Yaropolk, Andrey Vladimirovich was to rule Pereyaslavl.

Vsevolod Olgovich, then the prince of Chernigov, the Cumans and his allies who were asked by Iziaslav to make his point against Viacheslav, continued their war against Yaropolk and crossed the Dnieper to loot the Kiev region. After a decisive battle at the river Supoy in 1135, Yaropolk had to cede the town of Kursk only gained 17 years earlier.

Due to this change of balance the people of Novgorod expelled Vsevolod Mstislavich from Novgorod and replaced him with the brother of the Chernigov prince, Sviatoslav Olgovich. Vsevolod moved to Pskov and died in 1138 at the siege of Novgorod. Who were convinced to replace Sviatoslav with Rostislav Yuryevich, the eldest son of Yuri Dolgoruki.

Sviatoslav continued the war against Yaropolk with also this time, Yaropolk's old enemies, the Cumans on his side. He found soon the combined troops of Kiev, Pereyaslavl, Rostov, Polotsk, Smolensk, parts of Halych and 30,000 Hungarians, sent by the king Bela II before the gates of Chernigov. He was forced to make peace in 1139.

Just before his death Yaropolk assisted Bela II when he was faced with internal enemies.

He died in 1139, and was buried in the church of St. Andrey. His brother, Viacheslav I, who succeeded him was soon driven out by Vsevolod II.

== Marriage and children ==
Married in 1116 to Helena, an Ossetian princess.

1. Vasilko Yaropolkovich

== Bibliography ==
- Рыжов К. В. Ярополк II Владимирович // Все монархи мира. Россия. — М.: Вече, 1998. — ISBN 5-7838-0268-9
- Хмыров М. Д. Ярополк II Владимирович // Алфавитно-справочный перечень государей русских и замечательнейших особ их крови. — СПб.: Тип. А. Бенке, 1870. — С. 81–82.

== See also ==
- Cuman people
- Cumania
- Kipchak people
- Cuman language
- Kipchak languages

== Notes ==
Yaropolk II Vladimirovich Rurik Born: 1082 Died: 18 February 1139
Regnal titles
Preceded by Svyatoslav Vladimirovich	Prince of Pereyaslav; 1114–1132	Succeeded by Vsevolod Mstislavich
Preceded by Mstislav I	Grand Prince of Kiev; 1132–1139	Succeeded by Vyacheslav I
