= Viacheslav I of Kiev =

Grand Prince of Kiev in 1139

Viacheslav I Vladimirovich (Note: Russian: Вячеслав Владимирович; Ukrainian: В'ячеслав Володимирович) (1083 – 2 February 1154) was a Prince of Smolensk (1113–1125), Turov (1125–1132; 1134–1146), Pereyaslavl (1132–1134; 1142), Peresopnytsia (1146–1149), Vyshgorod (1149–1151) and Grand Prince of Kiev (1139).

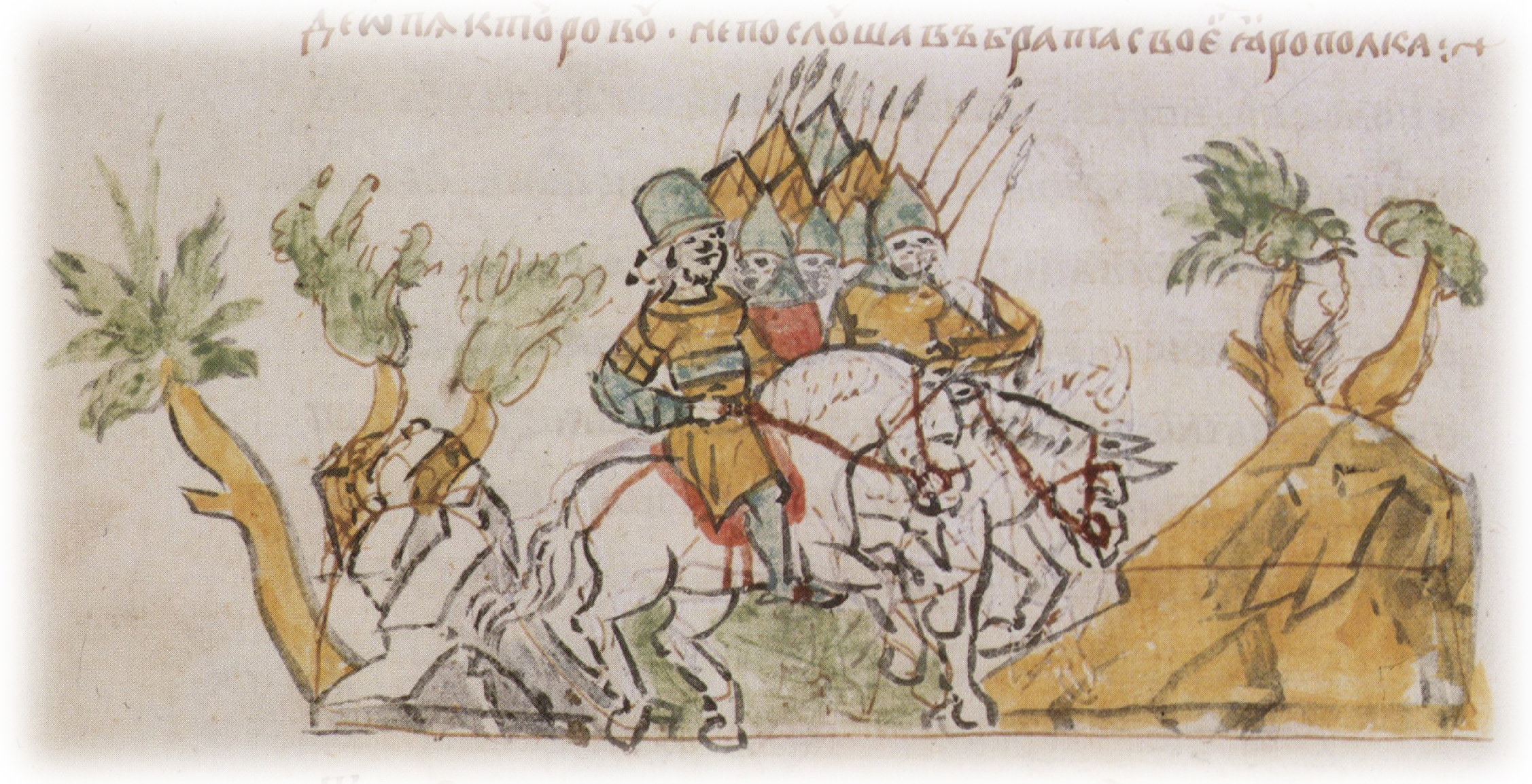
Vyacheslav at the head of his cavalry, miniature from the Radziwiłł Chronicle (15th century)

He was a son of Vladimir Monomakh and Gytha of Wessex. On 18 February 1139 he succeeded his brother Yaropolk II of Kiev as grand prince, but was driven out in March by Vsevolod II of Kiev. He later ruled Kiev jointly with his nephew Iziaslav II of Kiev and died not long after Iziaslav in late 1154 or early 1155 and is buried in the St. Sophia Cathedral in Kiev. His only son, Michael Viacheslavovich, had predeceased him in 1129.

== Notes ==
Viacheslav I Vladimirovich Rurik Born: 1083 Died: 2 February 1154
Regnal titles
Preceded by Sviatoslav Vladimirovich	Prince of Smolensk; 1113–1127	Succeeded by Rostislav Mstislavich
Vacant control of grand prince Title last held by Viacheslav Iaropolkovich	Prince of Turov; 1127–1132	Succeeded by Vsevolod Mstislavich
Preceded by Izyaslav Mstislavich	Prince of Pereyaslavl; 1132–1134	Succeeded by Andrey Vladimirovich
Preceded by Izyaslav Mstislavich	Prince of Turov; 1134–1146	Succeeded by Andrey Bogolyubsky
Preceded by Andrey Vladimirovich	Prince of Pereyaslavl; 1142	Succeeded by Izyaslav Mstislavich
Preceded by Yaropolk II	Grand Prince of Kiev; 1139	Succeeded by Vsevolod II
Preceded by Yuri I	Grand Prince of Kiev; 1151–1154 with Iziaslav II	Succeeded by Rostislav I
