= Vladimir IV of Kiev =

Grand Prince of Kiev from 1223 to 1235

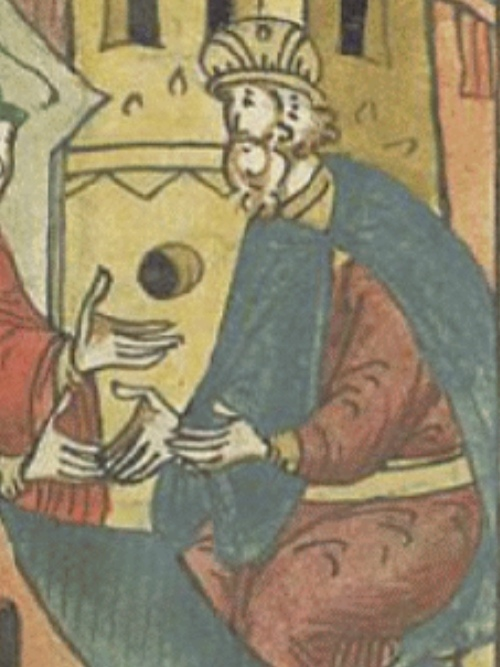
Vladimir on the Kievan throne, miniature from the Illustrated Chronicle of Ivan the Terrible (16th century)

Vladimir IV Rurikovich (Note: Russian: Владимир Рюрикович; Ukrainian: Володимир Рюрикович, romanized: Volodymyr Riurykovych) (1187 – 3 March 1239) was Prince of Pereyaslavl (1206–1213), Smolensk (1213–1219) and Grand Prince of Kiev (1223–1235). He was the second son of Rurik Rostislavich.

== Notes ==
Preceded by Mstislav III	Grand Prince of Kiev; 1223–1235	Succeeded by Iziaslav IV
