= Iziaslav II of Kiev =

Grand Prince of Kiev from 1146 to 1154

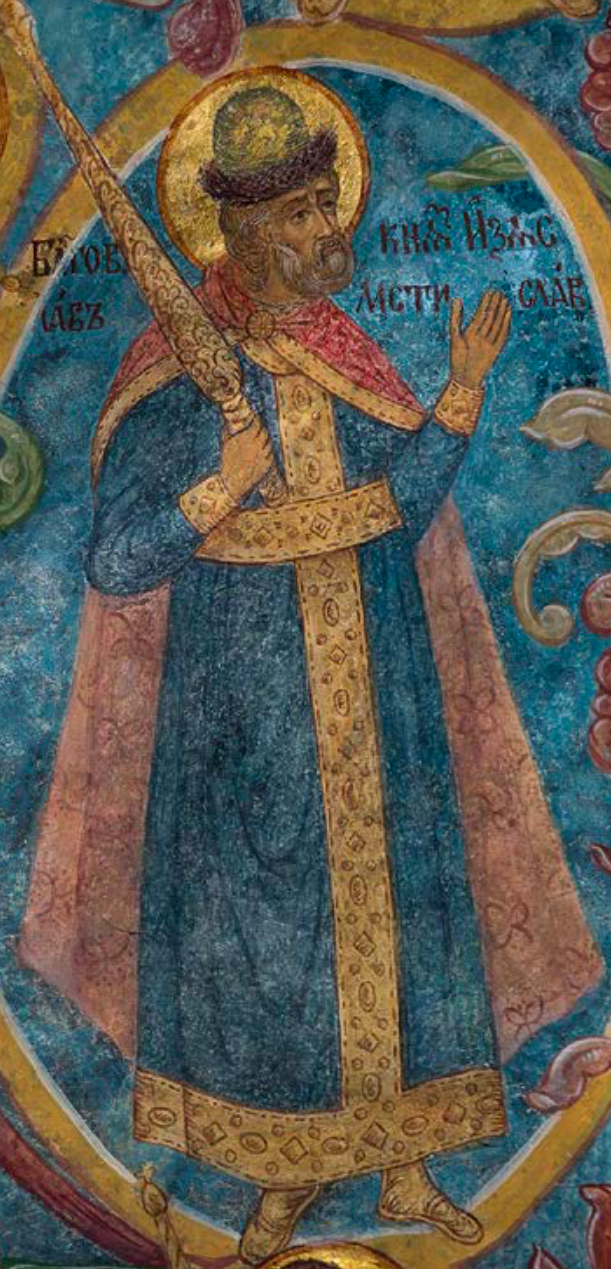
Fresco of the Novospassky Monastery, 1680s

Iziaslav II Mstislavich (Note: Russian: Изяслав II Мстиславич; Ukrainian: Ізяслав Мстиславич) (c. 1096 – 13 November 1154) was Grand Prince of Kiev (1146–1154). He was also Prince of Pereyaslavl (1132; 1143–1145), Prince of Turov (1132–1134), Prince of Rostov (1134–), and Prince of Volhynia (1134–1142). He is the founder of the Iziaslavichi branch of Rurikid princes in Volhynia.

== Family ==
The second son of the Kievan prince Mstislav I and Christina Ingesdotter of Sweden, grandson of Vladimir II Monomakh. He was baptized as Panteleimon. The progenitor of the Izyaslavych dynasty of Volhynia and Galicia (senior branch). Great-grandfather of Daniel of Galicia.

The identity of his first wife, is a daughter of Conrad III of Germany and his first wife Gertrude of Comburg, her name was possibly "Agnes". She died in 1151. Their children were:

1. Mstislav II of Kiev
2. Yaroslav II of Kiev
3. Yaropolk, Prince of Shumsk
  1. Vasylko (1151–1182), prince of Shumsk
4. Evdokia, married Mieszko III the Old, High Duke of Poland.
5. daughter, in 1143 married Rogvold Rogvoldovich of Drutsk.

Iziaslav's second wife was Bagrationi daughter of King Demetrius I of Georgia, but they were married for only a few months in 1154 before his death. After the death of her husband, she returned to Georgia.

== Legacy ==
On August 24, 2022, the 8th Separate Special Purpose Regiment (Ukraine) was given his honorary name.

== Bibliography ==
- Martin, Janet (2007). Medieval Russia: 980–1584. Second Edition. E-book. Cambridge: Cambridge University Press. ISBN 978-0-511-36800-4.

Iziaslav II Mstislavich Rurik Born: ± 1097 Died: 13 November 1154
Regnal titles
Preceded by Vsevolod Mstislavich	Prince of Pereyaslavl; 1132	Succeeded by Viacheslav Vladimirovich
Preceded by Vsevolod Mstislavich	Prince of Turov; 1132–1134	Succeeded by Viacheslav Vladimirovich
Preceded by Viacheslav Vladimirovich	Prince of Pereyaslavl; 1142–1145	Succeeded by Mstislav Izyaslavich
Preceded by Igor II	Grand Prince of Kiev; 1146–1149	Succeeded by Yuri I
Preceded by Vyacheslav I	Grand Prince of Kiev; 1151–1154	Succeeded by Rostislav I
