= Vladimir II Monomakh =

Grand Prince of Kiev from 1113 to 1125

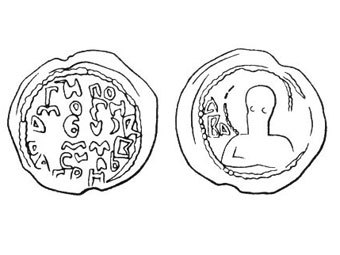
- Seal of Vladimir II Monomakh

Prince of Smolensk
- Reign: 1073–1078

Prince of Chernigov
- Reign: 1078–1094
- Predecessor: Vsevolod I of Kiev
- Successor: Oleg I of Chernigov

Prince of Pereyaslavl
- Reign: 1094–1113

Grand Prince of Kiev
- Reign: 1113–1125
- Predecessor: Sviatopolk II of Kiev
- Successor: Mstislav I of Kiev
- Born: 26 May 1053
- Died: 19 May 1125 (aged 71–72); Kiev
- Burial: Saint Sophia's Cathedral, Kiev
- Spouse: Gytha of Wessex; Second wife; Third wife
- Issue: Mstislav I of Kiev; Izyaslav Vladimirovich; Svyatoslav Vladimirovich; Yaropolk II of Kiev; Viacheslav I of Kiev; Marina Vladimirovna; Roman of Volhynia; Euphemia of Kiev; Agafia (Agatha); Yuri (George) Dolgoruki; Andrew of Volhynia
Names
- Vladimir Vsevolodovich
- Dynasty: Rurik
- Father: Vsevolod I
- Mother: "Greek princess"
- Religion: Eastern Orthodox Christianity

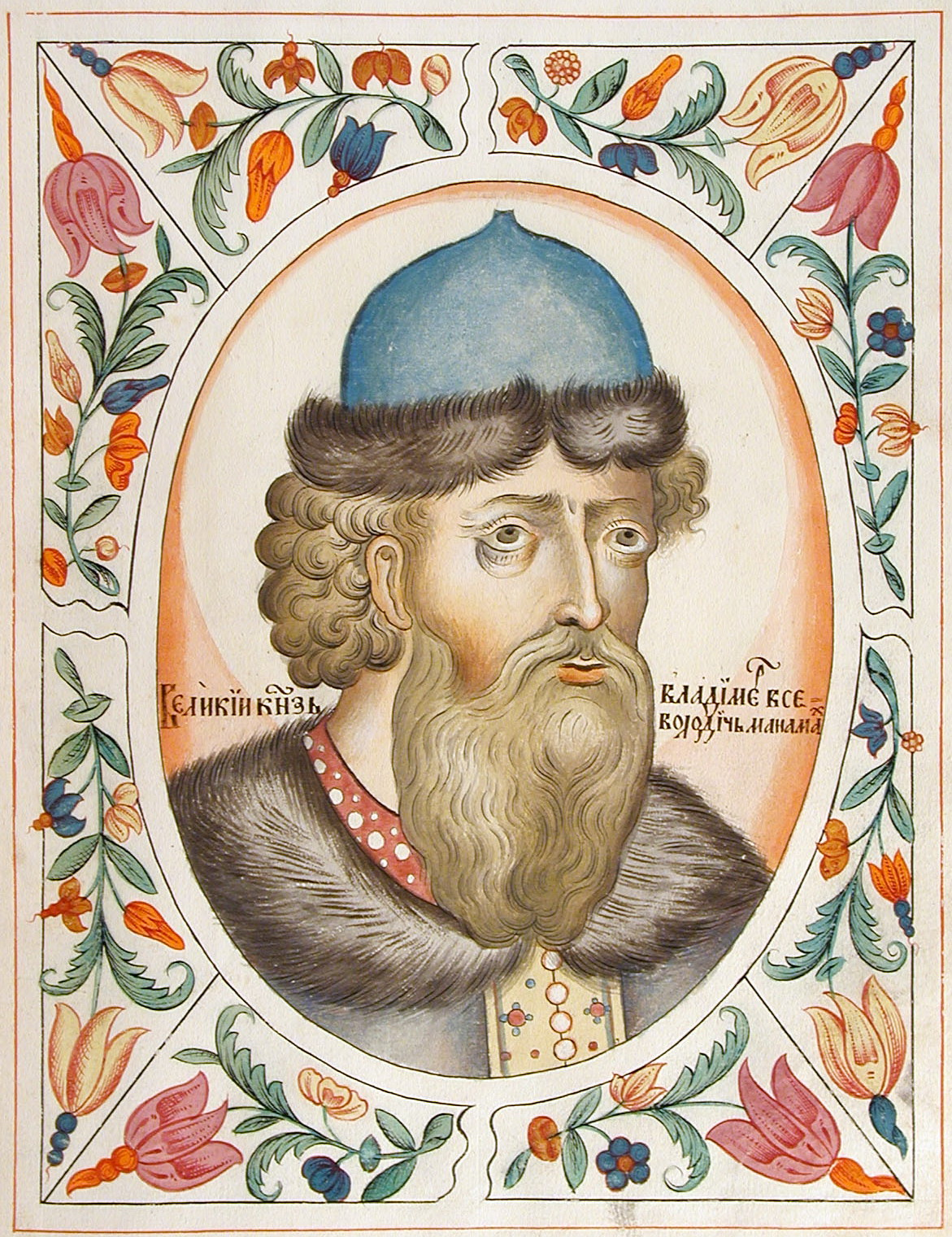
Portrait in the Tsarsky titulyarnik, 1672

Vladimir II Monomakh (Old East Slavic: Володимѣръ Мономахъ, romanized: Volodiměrŭ Monomakhŭ; (Note: Russian: Владимир Мономах; Ukrainian: Володимир Мономах, romanized: Volodymyr Monomakh; Belarusian: Уладзімер Манамах, romanized: Uladzimyer Manamakh) Christian name: Basil (Васи́лий); 26 May 1053 – 19 May 1125) was Grand Prince of Kiev from 1113 to 1125. Prince Monomakh distinguished himself in 83 large-scale campaigns into Polovtsian lands (Cumania), which made Polovtsians (Cumans) and their Khans fear him. He is considered a saint in the Eastern Orthodox Church and is commemorated on May 6, along with 122 other saints of Ukraine and Russia as well as Saint Andrew. He is not to be confused with Saint Vladimir the Great.

== Family background ==
His father was Vsevolod Yaroslavich, born 1030 as the fifth son of grand prince of Kiev Yaroslav the Wise (r. 1019–1054); he himself would go on to reign as grand prince Vsevolod I of Kiev from 1078 to 1093. In 1046, to seal an armistice in the Rus'–Byzantine War, Vsevolod Yaroslavich, then a junior member of the princely Rurikids of Kievan Rus', contracted a diplomatic marriage with a relative of the reigning Byzantine emperor Constantine IX Monomachos (r. 1042–1055), from whom Vladimir (born in 1053) likely inherited his sobriquet, Monomakh.

The name and ancestry of his mother are unknown; Byzantine sources do not mention the marriage at all, and the Primary Chronicle only says that his father Vsevolod had him by a tsesaritsa Gr'kyna, meaning 'Greek princess'. The fact that Vladimir Vsevolodovich was later given the nickname Monomakh provides the only significant clue, namely that his mother was likely a member of the Byzantine Monomachos family, the same as the then-reigning emperor Constantine IX. Contemporary Byzantine naming-practice allowed the adoption of a maternal surname if convention regarded the mother's family as of a more exalted origin than the father's.

According to a later fictitious story written in the early 16th century, The Tale of the Princes of Vladimir, Vladimir Vsevolodovich defeated Constantine Monomachos in a war, and Constantine sued for peace by offering him many gifts, after which Vladimir Vsevolodovich became known as Vladimir Monomakh; however, this is not possible, because Constantine died in 1055, when Vladimir was only one and a half years old. He is never called Monomakh in the Primary Chronicle, and the first time his name ever appears in primary sources as Volodimer' Monomakhŭ (Note: Володимерь Мономахъ.) is not until his eulogy sub anno 1126 [sic] in the Kievan Chronicle. It has also been found on his seal.

== Early life ==
During his rule in Smolensk and Chernigov, Monomakh led 13 military campaigns in the name of his father, then Grand Prince of Kiev, and also participated in diplomatic missions. In 1068 he allied himself with the Cuman chief Bilge-Tegin. In his famous Instruction (also known as The Testament) to his own children, Monomakh mentions that he conducted 83 military campaigns and 19 times made peace with the Polovtsi. At first he waged war against the steppe jointly with his cousin Oleg, but after Vladimir was sent by his father to rule Chernigov and Oleg made peace with the Polovtsi to retake that city from him, they parted company. Since that time, Vladimir and Oleg were bitter enemies who would often engage in internecine wars. The enmity continued among their children and more distant posterity.

After the death of his father Vsevolod, in 1094 Monomakh became the prince of Chernigov (Chernihiv), meanwhile his cousin Sviatopolk II, son of Iziaslav, took over Kiev. Using the uncertainty during the transition of power to new princes, Polovtsians soon invaded Rus and defeated the united forces of Sviatopolk, Vladmir Monomakh and the latter's brother Rostislav Vsevolodovich on the Stuhna river near Trypillia. During the battle Rostislav drowned, and Polovtsians devastated the vicinity of Kiev, besieging and capturing the town of Torchesk. Following this success, Oleg allied with the nomads and attacked Chernigov, forcing Monomakh to retreat to Pereyaslav. From 1094, Pereyaslav was Vladimir's chief patrimony, although he also controlled Rostov, Suzdal, and other northern provinces (see Principality of Pereyaslavl). In these lands he founded several towns, notably his namesake, Vladimir.

In order to unite the princes of Rus' in their struggle against the Great Steppe, Monomakh initiated three princely congresses being held at Lyubech in 1097, Vytachiv in 1100 and Dolobsk in 1103. The congresses aimed to satisfy Oleg and other dispossessed princes by allowing each princely branch to retain its patrimony. Between 1103 and 1111 Rus princes conducted yearly raids against the Polovtsians. In 1107 Monomakh defeated Boniak, a Cuman khan who led an invasion on Kievan Rus'. In 1111, Monomakh, alongside Sviatopolk, led an army at the Battle of the Salnitsa river, where they defeated a Cuman army. The site of this battle is probably at modern-day Izium. Those victories succeeded in drawing Cumans into the steppes and successfully prevented new raids against Rus.

== Reign in Kiev ==
When Sviatopolk II died in 1113, the Kievan populace revolted, attacking government officials, rich citizens and Jews, who were reported to have cooperated with the late prince. In order to restore order, the ruling circles of the capital invited Monomakh to take the throne, as he was considered to be the most liked ruler by the people. After accepting the invitation, the new prince immediately started working to remove the causes of popular disaffection by reducing the rate of interest on loans.

During his rule in Kiev Monomakh promulgated a number of reforms in order to allay the social tensions, providing concessions to burghers and lower estates of Kiev, regulating the status of bondsmen and restricting power of the boyars. Among others, Monomakh's decrees prohibited usury, banned the enslavement of merchants indebted as a result of an accident and defined the status of kholopy. The text of Monomakhs's statute was included into the revised edition of the Russkaya Pravda.

== Legacy ==
Vladimir Monomakh was buried at Saint Sophia Cathedral. Known as the founder of the Monomakhovichi dynasty, he became remembered as a strong ruler and skillful statesman, and the years of his rule saw the last flowering of Ancient Rus', which was torn apart by internal struggles after the death of his son and heir Mstislav in 1132.

Succeeding generations often referred to Monomakh reign as the golden age of Kiev. Numerous legends are connected with his name, including the transfer from Constantinople to Rus of such precious relics as the Theotokos of Vladimir, and the Vladimirian and Muscovite crown called Monomakh's Cap.

== Contribution to literature ==
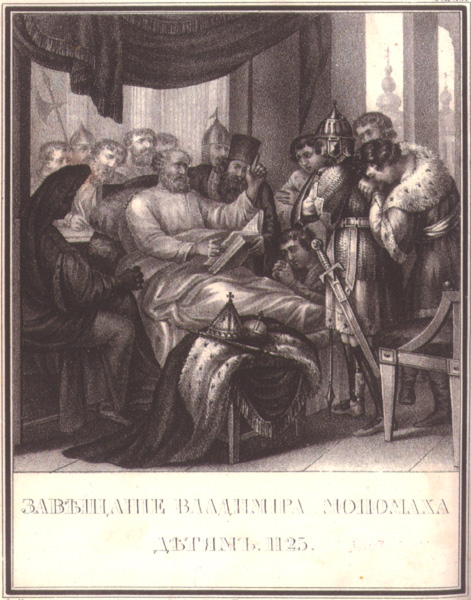
The Testament of Vladimir Monomakh to Children, 1125. Lithography of 1836.

Monomakh's Instruction to Children, written c. 1117, entered the Laurentian Chronicle along with his letter to prince Oleg Sviatoslavich. A didactical and autobiographical work, Poucheniie is considered to be one of the best texts of literature dating to the period of Kievan Rus', and contains passages condemning the internecine struggles between princes, promoting the idea of a unified state.

== Marriages and children ==
Vladimir married three times. The 13th-century chronicler Saxo Grammaticus reported that, in what would have been his first marriage, Vladimir wed Gytha of Wessex, daughter of Harold, King of England, who had fallen at Hastings in 1066 and of Edith Swannesha. This marriage is not reported by any contemporary sources, and none of the Russian sources report the name or parentage of Vladimir's first wife. The "Testament of Vladimir Monomakh" records the death of the mother of Vladimir's son Yuri on 7 May 1107, but it does not mention her name. Most historians agree it was more likely Yuri's mother was Gytha, based upon Yuri's acceptable marriage age in 1108.

They had at least the following children:

- Mstislav I of Kiev (1 June 1076 – 14 April 1132)
- Izyaslav Vladimirovich, Prince of Kursk (c. 1077 – 6 September 1096)
- Svyatoslav Vladimirovich, Prince of Smolensk and Pereyaslav (c. 1080 – 16 March 1114)
- Yaropolk II of Kiev (1082 – 18 February 1139)
- Viacheslav I of Kiev (1083 – 2 February 1154)

A daughter has been attributed to either the first or the second wife:

- Marina Vladimirovna (d. 1146). Married Leon Diogenes, a pretender to the throne of the Byzantine Empire who claimed to be a son of Romanos IV and who rose to the rank of khan of the Cumans in Ossetia.

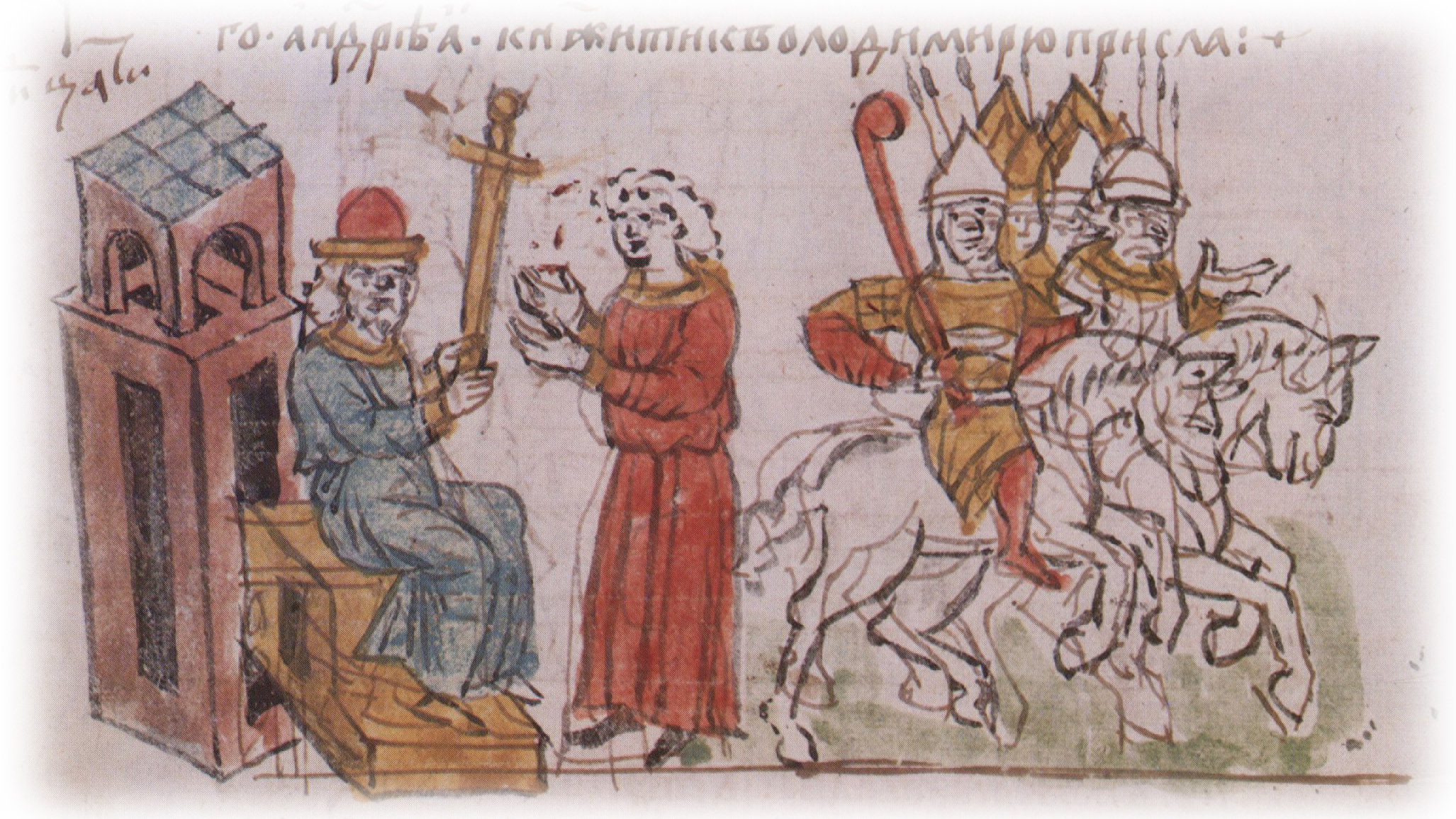
Monomakh giving his sword to his son Andrew, Prince of Volhynia - miniature from Radziwill Chronicle

Vladimir's second wife produced at least five children by Vladimir:

- Roman, Prince of Volhynia (d. 6 January 1119)
- Euphemia of Kiev (d. 4 April 1139). Married Coloman of Hungary.
- Agafia (Agatha). Married Vsevolod Davidovich, Prince of Grodno. According to older historians her husband was a son of David Igorevich, Prince of Volhynia (d. 1113), but this theory was rejected.
- Yuri (George), later known as Yuri Dolgoruki (d. 15 May 1157).
- Andrew, Prince of Volhynia (11 July 1102 – 1141).

Vladimir's third marriage is thought to have been to a daughter of Aepa Ocenevich, Khan of the Cumans. Her paternal grandfather was Osen. Her people belonged to the Kipchaks, a confederation of pastoralists and warriors of Turkic origin.

However the Primary Chronicle identifies Aepa as father-in-law to Yuri Dolgoruki, with Vladimir negotiating the marriage in name of his son. Whether father and son married sisters or the identity of intended groom was misidentified remains unclear.

== See also ==
- Council of Liubech

== Sources ==
- Dimnik, Martin (2016). Power Politics in Kievan Rus': Vladimir Monomakh and His Dynasty, 1054–1246. Pontifical Institute of Mediaeval Studies. ISBN 978-0-88844-202-4.
- Kazhdan, Alexander (1989). "Rus'-Byzantine Princely Marriages in the Eleventh and Twelfth Centuries". Harvard Ukrainian Studies. 12/13. Harvard Ukrainian Research Institute: 414–429.
- Kazhdan, Alexander, ed. (1991), Oxford Dictionary of Byzantium, Oxford University Press, ISBN 978-0-19-504652-6
- Raffensperger, Christian; Ostrowski, Donald (2023). The Ruling Families of Rus: Clan, Family and Kingdom. London: Reaktion Books. p. 309. ISBN 978-1-78914-745-2. (e-book)
- Hrushevsky, Michael (1970). History of Ukraine. Hamden: Archon Books. ISBN 0-208-00967-1.

Vladimir II Monomakh Rurik Born: 1053 Died: 1125
Regnal titles
Preceded by Sviatopolk II	Grand Prince of Kiev; 1113–1125	Succeeded by Mstislav I
