= Grand Prince of Kiev =

Title of the ruler of Kievan Rus' (10th–13th centuries)

Details
- First monarch: Oleg the Wise (first undisputed "Prince of Kiev"); Yaroslav the Wise (first undisputed "Grand Prince of Kiev")

The Grand Prince of Kiev (sometimes also Grand Duke) was the title of the monarch of Kievan Rus', residing in Kiev (modern Kyiv) from the 10th to 13th centuries. In the 13th century, Kiev became an appanage principality, first of the grand prince of Vladimir and the Mongol Golden Horde governors, and was later taken over by the Grand Duchy of Lithuania.

Rus' chronicles such as the Primary Chronicle are inconsistent in applying the title "grand prince" to various princes of Kievan Rus'. Although most sources consistently attribute it to the prince of Kiev, there is no agreement which princes were also "grand prince", and scholars have thus come up with different lists of grand princes of Kiev.

== Background ==
=== Origins ===
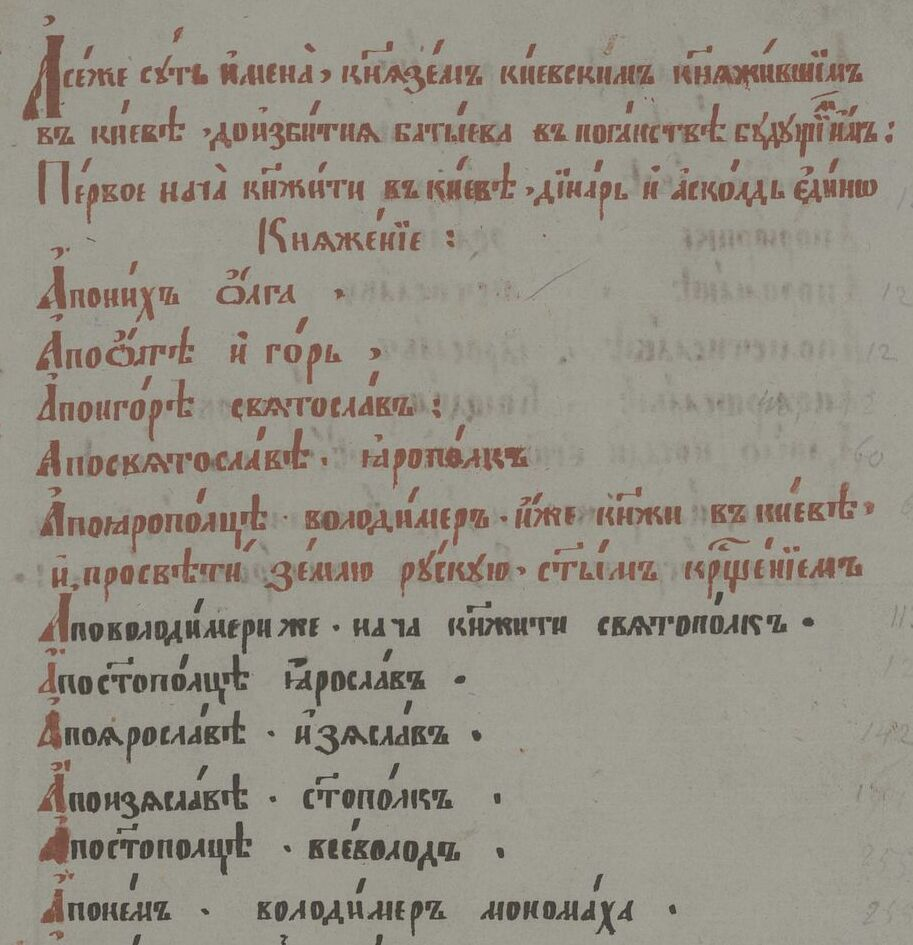
Regnal list in the opening lines of the Khlebnikov Codex: "In Kiev, the first to begin reigning together were Dinar and Askold, after them came Olga, after Olga Igor..."

According to a founding myth in the Primary Chronicle, Kyi, Shchek and Khoryv and their sister Lybid co-founded the city of Kiev (Kyiv), and the oldest brother Kyi was "chief of his kin" (Old East Slavic: кнѧжаше в родѣ, romanized: knyazhashe v rodie). Some western historians (i.e., Kevin Alan Brook) suppose that Kiev was founded by the Khazars or Magyars. Kiev is a Turkic place name (Küi = riverbank + ev = settlement). At least during the 8th and 9th centuries Kiev functioned as an outpost of the Khazar empire (a hill-fortress, called Sambat, "high place" in Old Turkic). According to Omeljan Pritsak, Constantine Zuckerman and other scholars, Khazars lost Kiev at the beginning of the 10th century.

At some point, Rurik, a Varangian prince, is alleged to have founded the "Rurik dynasty" (named after him in the 16th century) in 862 through the "calling of the Varangians", but some scholars consider this to be a mythical or legendary event. (Note: Christian Raffensperger (2012, 2017), Ostrowski (2018), Halperin (2022).) The Primary Chronicle never calls Rurik a prince of Kiev; the passage wherein Oleg "sat in Kiev" (Old East Slavic: понелѣже сѣде въ Кыевѣ, romanized: ponelězhe sěde vŭ Kyevě) makes no mention of Rurik, suggesting the author was "more interested in the first Rus' ruler to reside in Kiev than with any founder of a dynasty".

Kiev was captured by Askold and Dir, whose existence is also debatable, and are called "boyars" who "did not belong to [Rurik's] family" by the Primary Chronicle. According to some Russian historians (i.e., Gleb S. Lebedev), Dir was a chacanus of Rhos (Rus khagan). Thomas Noonan asserts that one of the Rus "sea-kings", the "High king", adopted the title khagan in the early 9th century. Peter Benjamin Golden maintained that the Rus became a part of the Khazar federation, and that their ruler was officially accepted as a vassal khagan of the Khazar Khagan of Itil.

Before the mid-15th century, no historical source claims that Rurik founded a dynasty; the Hypatian Codex of c. 1425 began its list of knyazi of Kiev with "Dir and Askold", then "Oleg", then "Igor", up to 1240, and does not mention Rurik anywhere. Similarly, the Khlebnikov Codex starts with a regnal list stating: "In Kiev, the first to begin reigning together were Dinar and Askold, after them came Olga, after Olga Igor, after Igor Sviatoslav, [...]". There is no mention of a "Rurik"; instead, the list starts with "Dinar and Askold". Unlike Hypatian's second place for Oleg the Wise, however, Khlebnikov appears to assert Olga of Kiev succeeded them, and preceded her own husband Igor of Kiev.

=== First princes ===
Askold and Dir are narrated to have been killed in 882 by Oleg, the first "prince" (knyaz) of Kiev according to the Primary Chronicle, but not yet a "grand prince" (velikiy knyaz). His relation to Rurik is debatable, and has been rejected by several modern scholars. Although later Muscovite chroniclers would call Oleg a "grand prince" and Kiev a "grand principality" (Old East Slavic: великое княжение, romanized: velikoe knyazhenie), the earliest sources do not. Whereas the reconstructed original Greek text of the Rusʹ–Byzantine Treaty (907) calls Oleg a μεγας ἄρχων or "great archon" ("ruler"), the Old East Slavic translations found in the Laurentian Codex and Hypatian Codex do not. On the other hand, only when the Byzantine emperors Leo VI the Wise, Alexander and Constantine VII are called "the Great", Oleg is also called "the Great". Dimnik (2004) argued it should thus be read as "the Rus' prince Oleg the Great" instead of "Oleg the grand prince of Rus'". Similarly, the only occasions Igor of Kiev is ever called velikiy knyaz in the Primary Chronicle (six times) are all found in the Rusʹ–Byzantine Treaty (945), where the Greek emperors are also called k velikiy tsesarem Grech'-skim ("to the great Greek caesars"). The same happens when, after Sviatoslav's invasion of Bulgaria, the 971 peace treaty is recorded; it is the only place in the Primary Chronicle where Sviatoslav I is named a velikiy knyaz. Most significantly, the Nachal'nyy svod (found only in the Novgorod First Chronicle) never mentions any of these peace treaties, and never calls Oleg, Igor or Sviatoslav a velikiy knyaz. According to Dimnik (2004), this means that Greek scribes added the word "great" to the princely title, whereas the Rus' themselves did not, except when translating these three treaties from Greek into Slavic.

Yaropolk I of Kiev and Volodimer I of Kiev are both steadily referred to as just a knyaz by the Novgorod First Chronicle and the Laurentian and Hypatian Codices. There is one exception: the Hypatian Codex writes Volodimir knyaz velikii ("Volodimir the grand prince") when reporting the latter's death; because the Hypatian Codex is the latest source of the three (compiled c. 1425), this is probably a later interpolation. A Paterik of the Kyiv Pechersk Lavra of the early 13th century also calls Volodimer a velikiy knyaz, but that was written two centuries after his death, and may not necessarily describe how he was known while alive. The oldest surviving source available is Hilarion of Kiev's Sermon on Law and Grace (c. 1040s), which calls Volodimer a kagan (a Khazar title) rather than a knyaz. Some scholars have suggested that this indicates Kievan Rus' had won its independence from the Khazars in the early 10th century, and had inherited the title of kagan from them, before exchanging it for knyaz later. The Church Statute of Prince Volodimir starts with "Behold, I, Prince Vasilii, called Volodimir," (Old East Slavic: Се аз, князь Василий, нарицаемыи Володимир, romanized: Se yaz, knyaz' Vasilii, naritsayemy Volodimir,), but later in the text he interchangeably calls himself knyaz and velikiy knyaz, and the earliest copy of this document is from the 14th century, so it is difficult to say what the lost original text said. Since chroniclers also regularly referred to Volodimer as velikiy without mentioning his title – the reason why he has become known to history as Volodimer "the Great" – suggests that this adjective was not part of his title, but a sobriquet or nickname, that was also applied to other monarchs or clerics around him.

=== Velikiy knyaz Yaroslav and descendants ===
Sviatopolk I of Kiev was never called velikiy knyaz ("grand prince") in any source. Moreover, he has been stigmatised by chroniclers with the nickname "the Accursed" or "the Damned" (okayannyy) because of how he violently rose to power in the war of succession following Volodimir's death in 1015. On the other hand, Yaroslav the Wise is the first widely attested velikiy knyaz ("grand prince") in virtually all sources of the second half of the 11th century, and surviving copies of the Church Statute of Prince Yaroslav also strongly suggest he applied the title to himself while he was alive. Dimnik (2004) concluded that by the end of Yaroslav's reign in the third quarter of the 11th century, he was regularly calling himself and being called the velikiy knyaz of Kiev, and the competing titles of kagan and tsar had decisively lost in favour of velikiy knyaz as the preferred appellation of the Kievan monarch. The velikiy knyaz was designated by genealogical seniority and given the right to reign from Kiev – the grand principality superior to all other principalities in the realm – over all other princes descended from Yaroslav. The reason why the system of succession did not always work as Yaroslav intended was because some princes simply usurped power through a coup d'état at the court in Kiev. The 1097 Council of Liubech upgraded the dynastic capitals of the inner circle of senior princes to grand principalities as well, but still acknowledged the superiority of Kiev.

It was not until the Sack of Kiev (1169) by Andrey Bogolyubsky of Vladimir-Suzdal that the grand princes of Vladimir launched a fierce competition with the grand princes of Kiev over who had primacy over the entire realm. Since then, the phrase "velikiy knyaz of Kiev" was merely titular, and chroniclers applied the symbolic title of velikiy knyaz to Kiev or Vladimir on the Klyazma according to whomever they favoured. In practice, the military supremacy of any particular prince – especially from Vsevolod the Big Nest onwards – would determine whether the other princes would or would not acknowledge him as "grand prince". After the Mongol invasion of Kievan Rus' and Sack of Kiev in the late 1230s and 1240s, the khans of the Golden Horde "in effect, terminated the office of the velikiy knyaz' of Kiev and conferred political supremacy on their puppet in Vladimir."

== Princes of Kiev ==
Name	Lifespan	Ruled From	Ruled Until	Notes
Oleg	?–912/922/940s	881/2 or 889	912/922/940s	First knyaz ("prince") of Kiev. Relation to Rurik and Igor is disputed. Date of accession is unclear in the Primary Chronicle. Date of death is disputed: 912 (according to Primary Chronicle); 922 (according to Novgorod First Chronicle); 940s (according to Genizah Letter)
Igor of Kiev	?–945	912	945	son of Rurik according to Primary Chronicle, but many scholars doubt or reject this claim. (Note: Including Hrushevsky (1904), Vernadsky (1943), Riasanovsky (1947), Paszkiewicz (1954), Franklin and Shepard (1996).)
Olga of Kiev	?–969	945	962	(regent-consort)
Sviatoslav I	942–972	962	972	son of Igor
Yaropolk I (Jaropolk)	958 (960?)–980	972	980	One of Svyatoslav's two sons
Volodimir I "the Great"	958–1015	980	1015	One Svyatoslav's two sons; in 988 baptized the Rus'. The earliest sources call him just knyaz ("prince") or kagan, and nickname him Volodimir velikiy ("Volodimir the Great"); later sources also call him velikiy knyaz ("grand prince").
Sviatopolk I "the Accursed" (Note: The Old Slavonic is Свѧтопълкъ in the Cyrillic alphabet, the modern Ukrainian is Святополк, Polish is Świętopełk, Czech is Svatopluk, and Slovak is Svätopluk. Reconstructed, his name is Sventopluk. More commonly, his name is given in its Latin and Frankish equivalents: Suentopolcus, Suatopluk, Zventopluk, Zwentibald, Zwentibold, Zuentibold, or Zuentibald.)	980–1019	1015	1019	origin is debatable. Is never called velikiy knyaz ("grand prince") in any source.

== Grand princes of Kiev ==
Name	House	Lifespan	Ruled from	Ruled until	Notes
Yaroslav the Wise	Volodimerovichi	978–1054	1019	1054	son of Vladimir the Great, jointly with Mstislav in 1024–36. First widely attested velikiy knyaz ("grand prince") in virtually all contemporary sources.
Iziaslav I	Volodimerovichi	1024–1078	1054	1073	son of Yaroslav, first time (in 1068/69 lost state power to Polotsk princes)
Sviatoslav II	Volodimerovichi	1027–1076	1073	1076	son of Yaroslav
Vsevolod I	Volodimerovichi	1030–1093	1076	1077	son of Yaroslav, first time
Iziaslav I	Volodimerovichi	1024–1078	1077	1078	second time, in 1075 Pope Gregory VII sent him a crown from Rome
Vsevolod I	Volodimerovichi	1030–1093	1078	1093	second time
Sviatopolk II	Iziaslavichi	1050–1113	1093	1113	son of Iziaslav I
Vladimir II Monomakh	Monomakhovychi	1053–1125	1113	1125	son of Vsevolod I
Mstislav I of Kiev	Monomakhovychi	1076–1132	1125	1132	son of Vladimir II
Yaropolk II	Monomakhovychi	1082–1139	1132	1139	brother of Mstislav I
Viacheslav I	Monomakhovychi	1083–1154	1139	1139	brother of Yaropolk II (first time)
Vsevolod II	Olgovichi	?–1146	1139	1146	son of Oleh Svyatoslavich
Igor II	Olgovichi	?–1147	1146	1146	brother of Vsevolod II
Iziaslav II	Iziaslavichi (Monomakh)	1097–1154	1146	1149	son of Mstislav I (first time)
Yuri Dolgorukiy	Yurievichi (Monomakh)	1099–1157	1149	1151	(first time)
Viacheslav I	Monomakhovychi	1083–1154	1151	1154	(second time) jointly
Iziaslav II	Iziaslavichi	1097–1154	1151	1154	(second time) jointly
Rostislav I	Rostislavichi (Monomakh)	1110–1167	1154	1154	brother of Iziaslav II (first time)
Iziaslav III	Olgovichi	?–1162	1154	1155	(first time)
Yuri I Dolgorukiy	Yurievichi	1099–1157	1155	1157	(second time)
Iziaslav III	Olgovichi	?–1162	1157	1158	(second time)
Rostislav I	Rostislavichi	1110–1167	1158	1167	(second time) jointly with Iziaslav III in 1162
Mstislav II	Iziaslavichi	?–1172	1167	1169	son of Iziaslav II (first time)
Gleb	Yurievichi	?–1171	1169	1169	son of Yuri Dolgorukiy (first time)
Mstislav II	Iziaslavichi	?–1172	1170	1170	(second time)
Gleb	Yurievichi	?–1171	1170	1171	(second time)
Vladimir III Mstislavich	Monomakhovychi	1132–1171	1171	1171	son of Mstislav I the Great. Reigned 5 February – 10 May 1171.
Michael I	Yurievichi	?–1176	1171	1171	half-brother of Gleb
Roman I	Rostislavichi	?–1180	1171	1173	son of Rostislav I (first time)
Vsevolod III the Big Nest	Yurievichi	1154–1212	1173	1173	brother of Michael I
Rurik Rostislavich	Rostislavichi	?–1215	1173	1173	brother of Roman I (first time)
Sviatoslav III	Olgovichi	?–1194	1174	1174	son of Vsevolod II (first time)
Yaroslav II	Iziaslavichi	?–1180	1174	1175	son of Iziaslav II (first time)
Roman I	Rostislavichi	?–1180	1175	1177	(second time)
Sviatoslav III	Olgovichi	?–1194	1177	1180	(second time)
Yaroslav II	Iziaslavichi	?–1180	1180	1180	(second time)
Rurik Rostislavich	Rostislavichi	?–1215	1180	1182	(second time)
Sviatoslav III	Olgovichi	?–1194	1182	1194	(third time)
Rurik Rostislavich	Rostislavichi	?–1215	1194	1202	(third time)
Igor III	Iziaslavichi	?–?	1202	1202	son of Yaroslav II (first time)
Rurik Rostislavich	Rostislavichi	?–1215	1203	1206	jointly (fourth time)
Roman II the Great	Romanovichi (Iziaslavichi)	1160–1205	1203	1206	son of Mstislav II, jointly (1203–05)
Rostislav II	Rostislavichi	1173–1214	1203	1206	son of Rurik Rostislavich, jointly (1204–06)
Vsevolod IV the Red	Olgovichi	?–1212	1206	1207	son of Sviatoslav III (first time)
Rurik Rostislavich	Rostislavichi	?–1215	1207	1210	(fifth time)
Vsevolod IV the Red	Olgovichi	?–1212	1210	1212	(second time)
Igor III	Iziaslavichi	?–?	1212	1214	(second time)
Mstislav III	Rostislavichi	?–1223	1214	1223	son of Roman I
Vladimir IV	Rostislavichi	1187–1239	1223	1235	brother of Rostislav II
Iziaslav IV	Olgovichi or Rostislavichi	1186–?	1235	1236	son of Vladimir Igorevich or Mstislav
Yaroslav III	Yurievichi	1191–1246	1236	1238	son of Vsevolod the Big Nest (first time)
Michael II	Olgovichi	1185–1246	1238	1239	son of Vsevolod IV (first time)
Daniel of Galicia	Romanovichi	1201–1264	1239	1240	son of Roman the Great appointed Voivode Dmytro as his governor, while residing in Halych

=== Overview of princely branches of Kiev (1019–1169) ===
Princely branches of Kiev from Yaroslav the Wise until 1169

Volodimerovichi; Yaroslav the Wise
Sviatoslav II	Vsevolod I
Olgovichi of Chernigov; Oleg I of Chernigov	Davyd of Chernigov	Monomakhovichi; Vladimir II Monomakh
Vsevolod II	Igor II	Iziaslav III	Mstislavichi; Mstislav I	Yaropolk II	Viacheslav	Yurievichi of Suzdalia; Yuri Dolgorukiy
Sviatoslav III	Izyaslavichi of Volhynia; Iziaslav II	Rostislavichi of Smolensk; Rostislav I	Vladimir III	Andrey; Bogolyubsky	Gleb	Mikhail
Mstislav II

== Princes of Kiev after the Mongol conquest of Kiev ==
Due to the Mongol invasion of Kievan Rus' 1240, Michael of Chernigov left Kiev to seek military assistance from King Béla IV of Hungary. During that time, Prince Rostislav of Smolensk occupied Kiev, but was captured the same year by Daniel of Galicia who placed his voivode Dmytro to govern Kiev on his behalf while he resided in Halych. Being unsuccessful in Hungary, Michael visited Konrad I of Masovia. Receiving no results in Poland, he eventually asked Daniel of Galicia for asylum due to the Mongol invasion. Since the 14th century, the principality of Kiev started to fall under the influence of Grand Duchy of Lithuania. In 1299, the Metropolitan of Kiev Maximus moved his metropolitan see from Kiev to Vladimir-on-Klyazma. In 1321, after the battle on the Irpin River, Gediminas installed Mindgaugas, one of his subjects from the house of Olshanski, a descendant of the family of Vseslav of Polotsk that was exiled to the Byzantine Empire. In 1331, Kiev was once again taken by a member of the Siverski house (Olgovichi branch), the prince of Putivl. After Grand Duke Algirdas defeated the Golden Horde at the Battle of Blue Waters in 1362, he incorporated Kiev and its surrounding areas into the Grand Duchy of Lithuania.

Name	House	Lifespan	Ruled from	Ruled until	Notes
Michael II	Svyatoslavichi (Olgovichi)	1185–1246	1241	1243	(second time)
Yaroslav III	Yurievichi (Monomakh)	1191–1246	1243	1246	(second time)
Alexander Nevsky	Vladimirsky (Monomakh)	1220–1263	1246	1263	son of Yaroslav III
Yaroslav IV	Vladimirsky (Monomakh)	1230–1271	1263	1271	brother of Alexander
Lev	Galicia (Monomakh)	1228–1301	1271	1301	son of Daniel
Ivan-Volodymyr	Siverski (Olgovichi)	?–?	1301	?	
Stanislav Ivanovich	Siverski (Olgovichi)	1228–1301	?	1321	
Mindaugas Holshanski	Alšėniškiai	?–?	1321	1324	son of Holsha Romanovich
Algimantas-Michael	Alšėniškiai	?–?	1324	1331	son of Mindaugas
Fyodor (Teodoras)	Siverski (Olgovichi)	?–?	1331	1362	son of Ivan
Vladimir V Algirdaitis	Gediminids	?–?	1362	1394	son of Algirdas
Skirgaila	Gediminids	1354–1397	1395	1397	son of Algirdas
Ivan Olshansky	Alšėniškiai	?–?	1397	c. 1402	son of Algimantas (in 1404–11 Jurgis Gedgaudas as voivode)
Andrew	Alšėniškiai	?–?	c. 1412	c. 1422	son of Ivan
Michael IV	Alšėniškiai	?–1433	c. 1422	c. 1432	son of Ivan
Michael V Boloban	Alšėniškiai	?–1435	c. 1433	c. 1435	son of Simonas
Boleslav (Švitrigaila)	Gediminids	1370–1452	1432	1440	son of Algirdas
Aleksandras Olelka	Olelkovich	?–1454	1443	1454	son of Vladimir
Simeon Olelkovich	Olelkovich	1418–1470	1454	1470	son of Alexander

== See also ==
- List of princesses and grand princesses consort of Kiev
- Kiev Voivodeship
- King of Ruthenia
- Grand Prince of Vladimir
- List of Hungarian monarchs
- List of Polish monarchs
- List of rulers of Galicia and Volhynia
- List of rulers of Lithuania
- List of Russian monarchs
- List of leaders of Ukraine
- Of Kiev
- Symbols of the Rurikids
- Rí
- Imperator totius Hispaniae

== Bibliography ==
- Cross, Samuel Hazzard; Sherbowitz-Wetzor, Olgerd P. (1930). The Russian Primary Chronicle, Laurentian Text. Translated and edited by Samuel Hazzard Cross and Olgerd P. Sherbowitz-Wetzor (1930) (PDF). Cambridge, Massachusetts: The Mediaeval Academy of America. p. 325. (primary source)
- Dimnik, Martin (January 2004). "The Title "Grand Prince" in Kievan Rus'". Mediaeval Studies. 66: 253–312. doi:10.1484/J.MS.2.306512.
- Halperin, Charles J. (2022). The Rise and Demise of the Myth of the Rus' Land (PDF). Leeds: Arc Humanities Press. p. 107. ISBN 9781802700565.
- Jusupović, Adrian (2022). The Chronicle of Halych-Volhynia and Historical Collections in Medieval Rus'. Leiden: Brill. p. 268. ISBN 9789004509306.
- Martin, Janet (2004). Medieval Russia: 980–1584. Cambridge: Cambridge University Press. ISBN 9780521368322. (digital printing 2004)
- Ostrowski, Donald (2018). "Was There a Riurikid Dynasty in Early Rus'?". Canadian-American Slavic Studies. 52 (1): 30–49. doi:10.1163/22102396-05201009.
