= Vsevolod II of Kiev =

Grand Prince of Kiev from 1139 to 1146

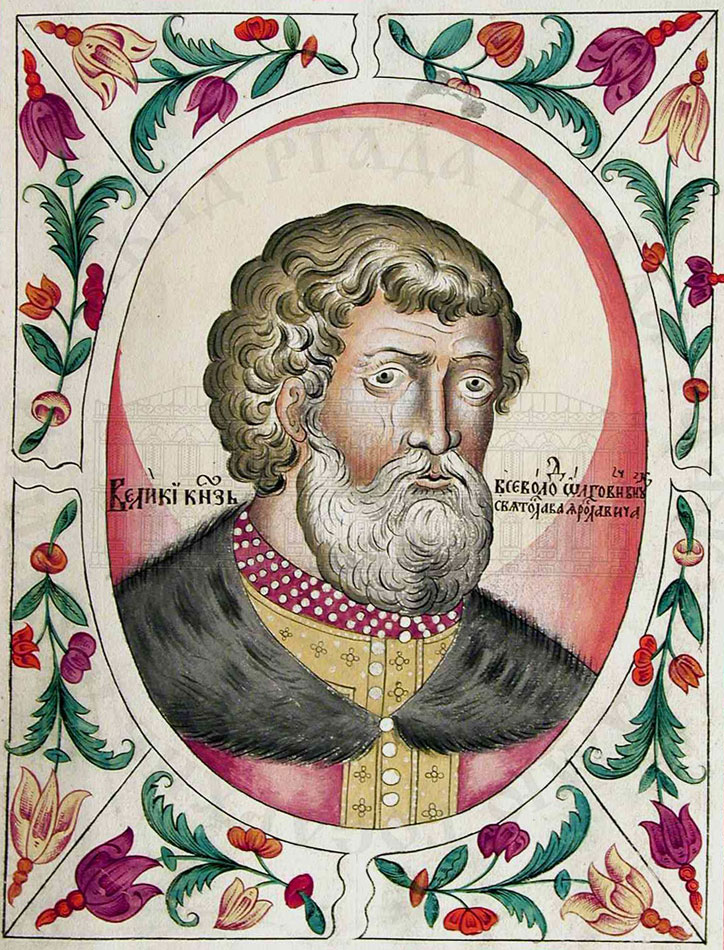
- Portrait in the Tsarsky titulyarnik (1672)

Grand Prince of Kiev
- Reign: 1139–1146
- Predecessor: Viacheslav
- Successor: Igor II

Prince of Chernigov
- Reign: 1127–1139
- Predecessor: Yaroslav Sviatoslavich
- Successor: Vladimir II Davydovich
- Died: 1 August 1146
- Spouse: Maria of Kiev
- Issue: Sviatoslav III of Kiev; Yaroslav II Vsevolodovich; Anna; Zvenislava
- House: Rurik
- Father: Oleg I of Chernigov
- Mother: Theophano Mouzalonissa, archontess of Rhousia
- Religion: Eastern Orthodox Christianity

Vsevolod II Olgovich (Note: Russian and Ukrainian: Всеволод II Ольгович) (died August 1, 1146) was Prince of Chernigov (1127–1139) and Grand Prince of Kiev (1139–1146). He was a son of Oleg Svyatoslavich, Prince of Chernigov.

== Family ==
Vsevolod married Maria Mstislavna of Kiev, the daughter of Grand Duke Mstislav of Kiev. They had two sons and two daughters:

1. Sviatoslav III of Kiev
2. Yaroslav II Vsevolodovich, born in 1139
3. Anna of Chernigov, married a prince of Halych, son of Vasylko Rostyslavych according to some chronicles
4. Zvenislava of Chernigov, married Boleslaw I the Tall, Duke of Wroclaw

Though he had two sons, Vsevolod's chosen successor was his brother, Igor, and he obtained pledges from his subjects to accept Igor as his heir. According to one account, Vsevolod even had the Kievans kiss the Holy Cross and swear loyalty to Igor, which they resented. Shortly before his death, Vsevolod became a monk under the name Gavriil.

== Sources ==
- Dimnik, Martin. The Dynasty of Chernigov, 1146-1246, 2003
- Рыжов К. В. Всеволод II Ольгович // Все монархи мира. Россия. — М.: Вече, 1998. — ISBN 5-7838-0268-9
- Хмыров М. Д. Всеволод II Ольгович // Алфавитно-справочный перечень государей русских и замечательнейших особ их крови. — СПб.: Тип. А. Бенке, 1870. — С. 24—25.

Vsevolod II of Kiev Rurik Died: 1 August 1146
Preceded by Viacheslav	Grand Prince of Kiev; 1139–1146	Succeeded by Igor II
