= Yuri Dolgorukiy =

Prince of Rostov and Suzdal (died 1157)

Yuri I Dolgorukiy
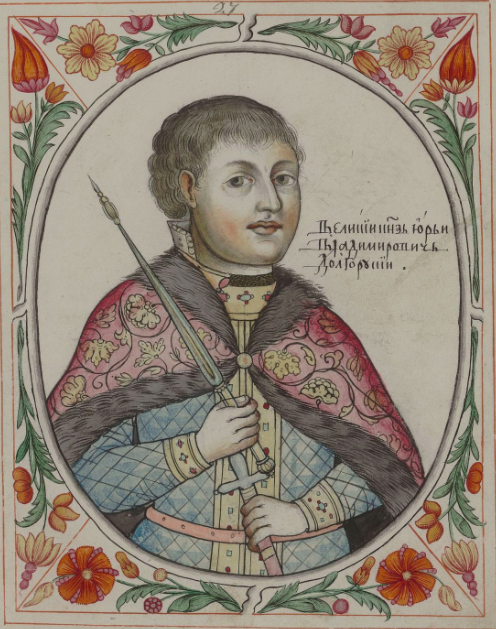

Prince of Rostov and Suzdal
- Reign: c. 1108 or 1125 – 1157
- Predecessor: First
- Successor: Andrey Bogolyubsky

Grand Prince of Kiev (first)
- Reign: 1149–1151
- Predecessor: Iziaslav II Mstislavich
- Successor: Iziaslav II Mstislavich

Grand Prince of Kiev (second)
- Reign: 1155–1157
- Predecessor: Iziaslav III Davidovich
- Successor: Iziaslav III Davidovich
- Born: 1099
- Died: 15 May 1157 (aged 57)
- Burial: Church of the Saviour at Berestove
- Spouse: daughter of Ayyub Khan; Helena of Constantinople
- Issue: Rostislav Yuryevich; Andrei I Bogolyubsky; Gleb of Kiev; Mikhail of Vladimir; Davyd Yuryevich; Vsevolod the Big Nest
Names
- Yuri "Dolgorukiy" Vladimirovich; Yuri of Rostov-Suzdal
- Dynasty: Rurikids (main dynasty name); Monomakhovichi (sub-name); Yurievichi (founder)
- Father: Vladimir II Monomakh
- Religion: Eastern Orthodox Christianity

Yuri I Vladimirovich (Russian: Юрий Владимирович, romanized: Yury Vladimirovich; Old East Slavic: Гюрги Володи́мирович; c. 1099 – 15 May 1157), commonly known as Yuri Dolgorukiy (Russian: Юрий Долгорукий, romanized: Yury Dolgoruky, lit. 'Yuri the Long-armed' or 'Yuri the Long Arm'), was a Monomakhovichi prince of Rostov and Suzdal, acquiring the name Suzdalia during his reign. Noted for successfully curbing the privileges of the landowning boyar class in Rostov-Suzdal and his ambitious building programme, Yuri transformed this principality into the independent power that would evolve into early modern Muscovy. Yuri Dolgorukiy was the progenitor of the Yurievichi (Russian: Юрьевичи, romanized: Yuryevichi; Ukrainian: Юрійовичі, romanized: Yuriiovychi), a branch of the Monomakhovichi.

Yuri spent much of his life in internecine strife with the other Rus' princes for suzerainty over the Kievan Rus, which had been held by his father (Vladimir Monomakh) and his elder brother before him. Although he twice managed to briefly hold Kiev (in September 1149 – April 1151, again in March 1155 – May 1157) and rule as Grand Prince of Kiev, his autocratic rule and perceived foreigner status made him unpopular with the powerful Kievan boyars, leading to his presumed poisoning and the expulsion of his son (later Andrei Bogoliubsky of Vladimir-Suzdal) in 1157. His rule marked the effective end of the Rus' as a unified entity until the Mongol invasions, with powerful provincial territories like Vladimir-Suzdal and Galicia-Volhynia now competing for the throne of Kiev.

== Biography ==
=== Birth ===
Yuri was the sixth son of Vladimir Monomakh. It is unclear when Yuri was born. Some chronicles report that Yuri's elder brother, Viacheslav, said to him: "I am much older than you; I was already bearded when you were born." Since Viacheslav was born in 1083, this supposedly pushes Yuri's birth to c. 1099/1100. However, the Primary Chronicle records the first marriage of Yuri – on 12 January 1108. It means that Yuri was born before c. 1099/1100 (as he could not have been 6–9 years old at the time of marriage).

=== Activities in Rostov and Suzdal ===
In 1108 Vladimir Monomakh sent his young son Yuri to govern in his name the vast Vladimir-Suzdal principality in the north-east of Kievan Rus'. In 1121 Yuri quarreled with the boyars of Rostov and moved the capital of his lands from that city to Suzdal. As the area was sparsely populated, Yuri founded many fortresses there. He established the towns of Ksniatin (in 1134), Pereslavl-Zalesski and Yuriev-Polski (in 1152), and Dmitrov (in 1154). The establishment of Tver, Kostroma, and Vologda is also popularly assigned to Yuri.

In 1147 Yuri Dolgorukiy had a meeting with Sviatoslav Olgovich (then prince of Belgorod Kievsky) in a place called Moscow. In 1156 Yuri fortified Moscow with wooden walls and a moat. Although the settlement probably existed later or earlier, Dolgorukiy is often called "the Founder of Moscow".

=== Struggle for Kiev ===
For all the interest he took in fortifying his Northern lands, Yuri still coveted the throne of Kiev. It is his active participation in the Southern affairs that earned him the epithet of Dolgorukiy, "the far-reaching". His elder brother Mstislav of Kiev died in 1132, and "the Rus lands fell apart", as one chronicle put it. Yuri instantaneously declared war on the princes of Chernigov, the reigning Grand Prince and his brother Yaropolk II of Kiev, enthroned his son in Novgorod, and captured his father's hereditary principality at Pereyaslav of the South. The Novgorodians, however, betrayed him, and Yuri avenged by seizing their key eastern fortress, Torzhok.

In 1147, Dolgorukiy resumed his struggle for Kiev and in 1149 he captured it, but in 1151 he was driven from the capital of Rus by his nephew Iziaslav. In 1155, Yuri regained Kiev once again. After presumably being poisoned at the feast of a Kievan nobleman, Yuri unexpectedly died in 1157 which sparked anti-Suzdalian uprising in Kiev. Yuri Dolgoruki was interred at the Saviour Church in Berestovo, Kiev, but his tomb is empty.

== Marriages and children ==
The Primary Chronicle records the first marriage of Yuri on 12 January 1108. His first wife was a daughter of Ayyub Khan (in Slavic sources: Аепа Осенев, Aepa son of Osen), Khan of the Cumans. Her paternal grandfather was Osen. Her people belonged to the Cumans, a confederation of pastoralists and warriors of Turkic origin.

His second wife Helena survived him and moved to Constantinople. Her paternity is not known for certain, but Nikolay Karamzin was the first to theorise that Helena was returning to her native city. She has since been theorised to be a member of the Komnenos dynasty which ruled the Byzantine Empire throughout the life of Yuri.

Yuri had at least fifteen children. The identities of the mothers are not known for certain.

- The following are considered elder children and usually attributed to the first wife.
  - Rostislav, Prince of Pereyaslavl (d. 6 April 1151).
  - Ivan, Prince of Kursk (d. 24 February 1147).
  - Olga (d. 1189). Married Yaroslav Osmomysl.
  - Andrei I Bogolyubsky (c. 1111 – 28 June 1174).
  - Maria. Married Oleg II Svyatoslavich, Prince of Novhorod-Siverskyi.
  - Sviatoslav (d. 11 January 1174).
  - Yaroslav (d. 12 April 1166).
  - Gleb of Kiev (d. 1171).
  - Boris, Prince of Belgorod and Turov (d. 12 May 1159).
  - Mstislav, Prince of Novgorod (d. 1166).
  - Vasilko, Prince of Suzdal (deposed in 1161).
- The following are considered youngest and typically attributed to the second wife
  - Mikhail of Vladimir (d. 20 June 1176).
  - Vsevolod the Big Nest (1154 – 12 April 1212).
  - Yaropolk.

== Memorials ==
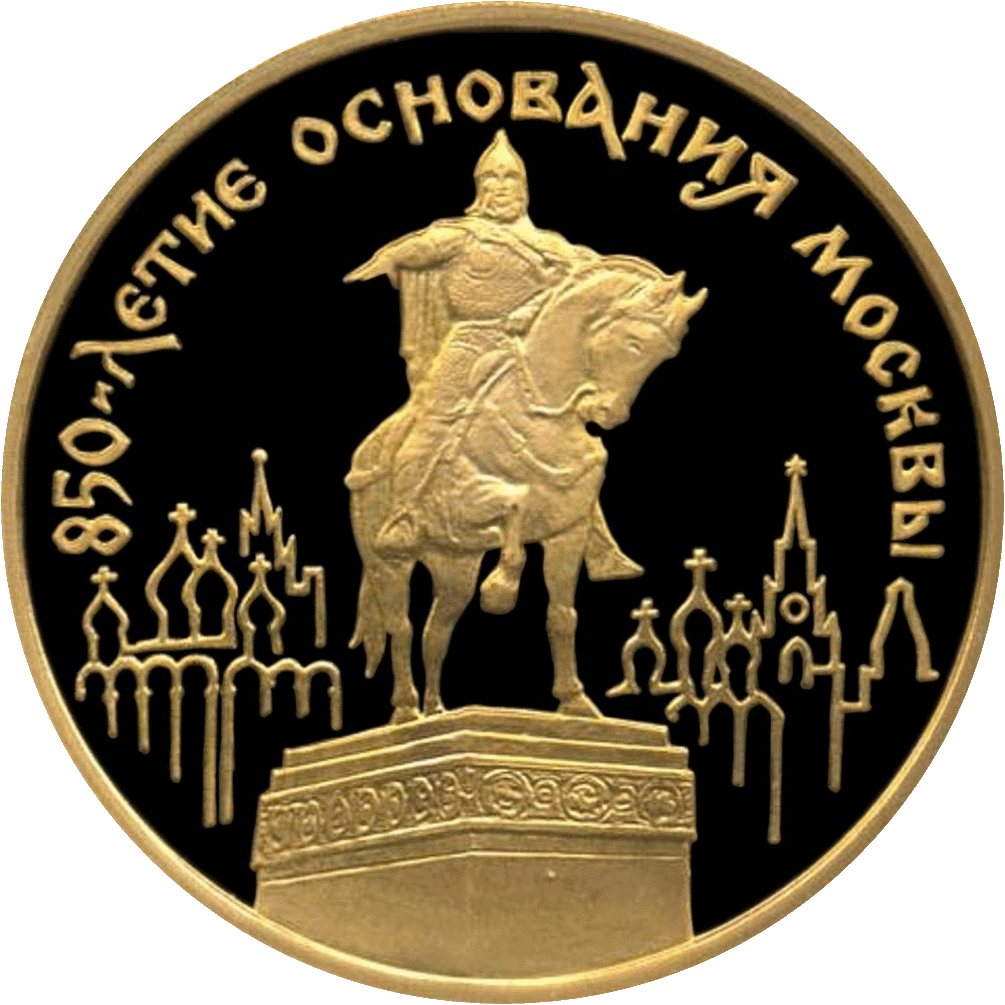
The Moscow monument of Yuri Dolgorukiy as shown on a 1997 Russian coin

Yuri's memory is cherished as the legendary founder of Moscow. His patron saint, Saint George appears on the coat of arms of Moscow slaying a dragon. In 1954, a monument to him designed by sculptor Sergei Orlov was erected on Moscow's Tverskaya Street, the city's principal avenue, in front of the Moscow municipality.

Dolgoruki's image was stamped on the Medal "In Commemoration of the 800th Anniversary of Moscow", introduced in 1947.

There are monuments of Yuri Dolgorukiy in Dmitrov and Kostroma.

The nuclear submarine RFS Yury Dolgoruky is named after him.

Yuri Dolgorukiy Yurievichi Born: 1099 Died: 15 May 1157
Regnal titles
Preceded by ?	Prince of Rostov and Suzdal; 1108–1157	Succeeded by Andrei Bogolyubsky
Preceded by Iziaslav II	Grand Prince of Kiev; 1149–1151	Succeeded by Iziaslav II; Viacheslav I
Preceded by Rostislav I	Grand Prince of Kiev; 1155–1157	Succeeded by Iziaslav III

== Bibliography ==
- Martin, Janet (2007). Medieval Russia: 980–1584. Second Edition. E-book. Cambridge: Cambridge University Press. ISBN 978-0-511-36800-4.
