= Of Chernigov =

Toponymic epithet

Of Chernigov is a toponymic epithet associated with the Principality of Chernigov or the city Chernigov. Notable people with this epithet include:

- Catherine of Chernigov
- Isaac of Chernigov, Jewish scholar in the Kievan Rus' of the twelfth century
- Kunigunda of Chernigov
- Maria of Chernigov
- Michael of Chernigov
- Mstislav of Chernigov
- Oleg I of Chernigov (died 1115), prince of Chernigov
- Oleg III Svyatoslavich (died 1204), prince of Chernigov
- Svyatoslav of Chernigov
- Svyatoslav Olgovich of Chernigov
- Yaroslav Svyatoslavich of Chernigov

== See also ==
- Prince of Chernigov
