= Mstislav II Svyatoslavich =

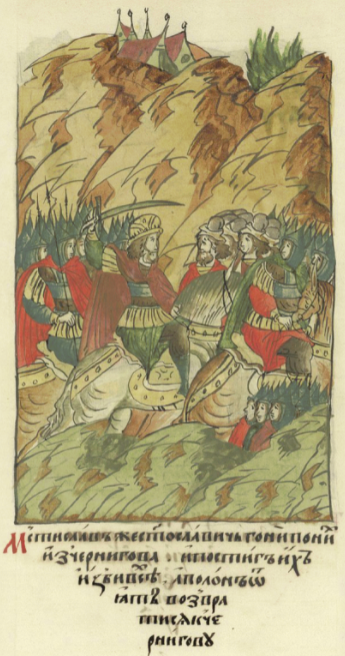
- Mstislav in battle, miniature from the Illustrated Chronicle of Ivan the Terrible (16th century)]]

Prince of Chernigov
- Reign: 1215/20–1223
- Predecessor: Gleb Svyatoslavich of Chernigov
- Successor: Michael of Chernigov
- Born: c. 1168
- Died: 31 May 1223 (aged 55-54)
- House: Olgovichi
- Father: Sviatoslav III of Kiev
- Mother: Maria Vasilkovna of Polotsk

Mstislav II Svyatoslavich (c. 1168 – 31 May 1223) was a Kievan Rus' prince. His baptismal name was Panteleymon. He was probably prince of Kozelsk (1194–1223), of Novgorod-Seversk (1206–1219), and of Chernigov (1215/1220–1223). He was killed in the Battle of the Kalka River.

== Biography ==
He was the youngest son of Grand Prince Svyatoslav Vsevolodovich of Kiev and Maria Vasilkovna of Polotsk.

At the beginning of 1182, when his father and Prince Vsevolod Yuryevich of Suzdalia concluded peace, the latter promised to give his wife’s sister as wife to Mstislav. Mstislav married Yasynya (whose Christian name was Marfa) at the beginning of 1183.

In the summer of 1184, his father launched a major campaign against the Cumans and summoned him. In 1189, after the Hungarians had occupied the principality of Halych, his father agreed to attack them with Prince Rurik Rostislavich, and Mstislav rode with his father. However, his father and Rurik Rostislavich failed to reach an agreement on the partition of the lands to be occupied, and thus they returned home. In 1192, his father sent him and his elder brothers (Vladimir and Vsevolod Svyatoslavich) to take part in the campaign of Igor Svyatoslavich, Prince of Novgorod-Seversk against the Cumans, but on seeing that they were outnumbered Igor Svyatoslavich resolutely ordered his troops to steal away under the cover of darkness.

His father died in the last week of July 1194 and his only brother, Yaroslav II Vsevolodovich of Chernigov, became the senior prince of his dynasty; thus the genealogical reshuffle made Svyatoslav Vsevolodovich's sons (among them Mstislav) answerable to their uncle. Mstislav probably inherited Kozelsk from his father who divided up the Vyatichi lands among his several sons.

In the spring of 1223, the Tatars (the Mongols) arrived on the frontiers of Rus’ and attacked the Cumans; the latter, unable to withstand the onslaught, fled to Rus’ warning the princes. Under the influence of Mstislav Mstislavich the Bold several of the Russian princes (among them Mstislav, and Grand Prince Mstislav Romanovich of Kiev) agreed to cooperate with the Cumans against the Mongols. The first skirmish took place on the banks of the Dnieper River, and in this vanguard battle Mstislav Mstislavich succeeded in defeating a detachment of Mongol troops. After their victory, the Russian armies crossed the river and marched through the steppes for 8 days before they met the main Mongol force at the banks of the Kalka River. There, without consultation with the princes of Kiev and Chernihiv, Mstislav Mstislavich the Bold and the Cumans attacked the Mongols. The results were disastrous: their forces were disorganized, and a number of princes, including Mstislav and his son, perished during the flight. Their bodies were left to the mercy of prairie scavengers.

== Marriage and children ==
#1183: Yasynya (Marfa), the sister of Maria, the wife of Prince Vsevolod Yuryevich of Suzdalia

- Dmitry Mstislavich (c. 1185 – May 31, 1223)
- Andrey Mstislavich
- Ioann Mstislavich
- Gavriil Mstislavich

== Ancestors ==
Ancestors of Mstislav II Svyatoslavich

16. Sviatoslav II Yaroslavich, grand prince of Kiev
8. Oleg Svyatoslavich, prince of Chernigov
4. Vsevolod II Olgovich, grand prince of Kiev
9. Theophano Musalonissa
2. Sviatoslav III Vsevolodovich, grand prince of Kiev
20. Vladimir II Vsevolodovich, grand prince of Kiev
10. Mstislav Vladimirovich, grand prince of Kiev
21. Gytha of England
5. Maria Mstislavna of Kiev
22. Inge Stenkilsson, king of Sweden
11. Christine of Sweden
23. Helena
1. Mstislav II Svyatoslavich
24. Vseslav Bryacheslavich, prince of Polotsk
12. Sviatoslav Vseslavich, prince of Polotsk
6. Vasilko Svyatoslavich of Polotsk
3. Maria Vasilkovna of Polotsk

== Sources ==
- Dimnik, Martin: The Dynasty of Chernigov - 1146-1246; Cambridge University Press, 2003, Cambridge; ISBN 978-0-521-03981-9.
- Vernadsky, George: Kievan Russia; Yale University Press, 1948, New Haven and London; ISBN 0-300-01647-6.

Preceded by (Part of the Principality of Chernigov)	Prince of Kozelsk; 1194–1223	Succeeded by Unknown
Preceded by Vladimir Igorevich	Prince of Novgorod-Seversk; 1206–1219	Succeeded by Michael of Chernigov
Preceded by Gleb Svyatoslavich	Prince of Chernigov; 1215/1220–1223	Succeeded by Michael of Chernigov
