= Catherine of Chernigov =

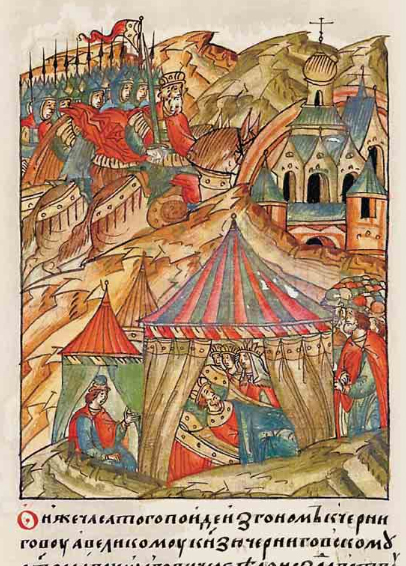
Catherine and her sons sitting at the deathbed of Sviatoslav Olgovich, while Oleg and Sviatoslav Vsevolodich march on Chernigov. Miniature from the Tsar Book (16th century)

Catherine, Kateryna or Ekaterina of Chernigov (Note: Ukrainian: Катерина Чернігівська, romanized: Kateryna Chernihivs'ka; Russian: Екатерина Черниговская, romanized: Ekaterina Chernigovskaya.) (died 12 April 1166) was princess consort of Chernigov (modern Chernihiv) as the wife of Sviatoslav Olgovich (r. 1154–1164), and princess regnant of Chernigov for a few days after his death (r. 1164–1164).

== Biography ==
In early chronicles, she is not named. Not until in later sources, she is named Ekaterina or Catherine, and identified as the daughter of Petryl or Petrilo, the posadnik of Novgorod. In 1136, she married Svyatoslav Olgovich (who had previously been married to an unnamed Cuman princess, daughter of Aepa, son of Girgen, who may have died giving birth to Oleg II Svyatoslavich around the same time). Their son Igor Sviatoslavich would later gain fame as the main character of The Tale of Igor's Campaign.

The Kievan Chronicle mentions sub anno 6667 (1159) that there was a "princess' city for Sviatoslav's defence" (Old East Slavic: городъ кнѧгининъ на щитъ Ст҃ославлеѣ) named "Oblov" (Ѡбловь) on the boundary between the lands of Smolensk and Chernigov, that was captured or razed by Iziaslav Davidovich. According to Dimnik (2003), this meant that Sviatoslav's princess consort Catherine of Chernigov owned this town, which she probably received as a wedding gift.

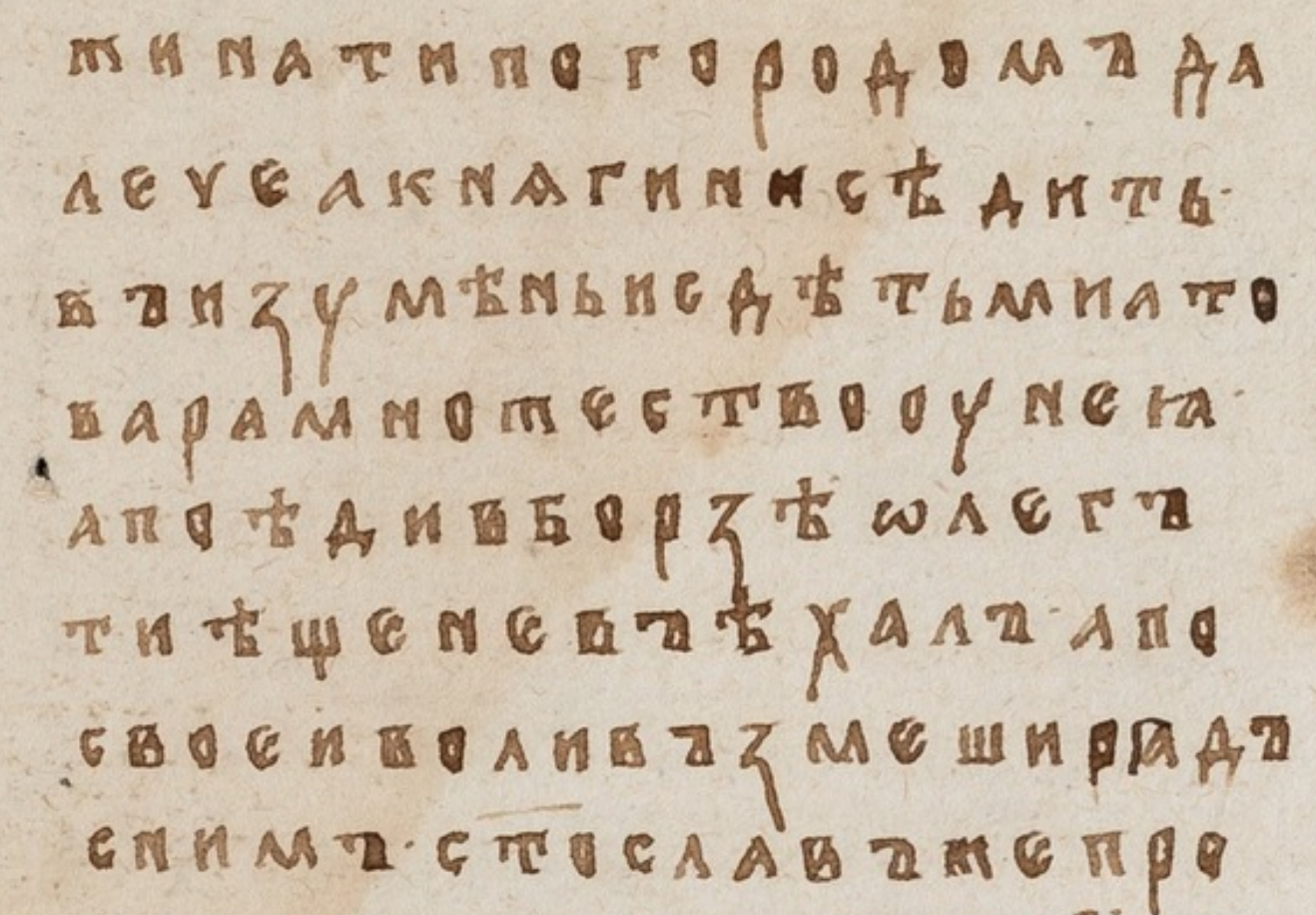
The bishop's letter to Vsevolodich: "...the princess [kniaginia] rules [sedit'] in cahoots with the children, and she has many goods. So come quickly, Oleg has not yet come, and you can come to an agreement with him."

Upon Sviatoslav's death in 1164, the widowed Catherine briefly ruled as princess regnant of Chernigov. Her reign lasted for a few days, during which she kept her husband's death a secret while she summoned her (step-?)son Oleg to come to Chernigov quickly, and told the city's leading men not inform her brother-in-law Sviatoslav Vsevolodich, who was the rightful heir to the Chernigovian throne. Nevertheless, the bishop of Chernigov betrayed the trust of princess (kniaginia) Catherine immediately, and sent Sviatoslav Vsevolodich a letter, writing that "the kniaginia rules [sedit'] in cahoots with the children and she has many goods." Sviatoslav Vsevolodich soon arrived and made a deal with Oleg, by which the former became prince of Chernigov and the latter prince of Novgorod-Seversk. Princess Catherine is not heard of again until two years later, when she reportedly died on 12 April 1166.

== Bibliography ==
=== Primary sources ===
- Kievan Chronicle (c. 1200)
  - (Church Slavonic critical edition) Shakhmatov, Aleksey Aleksandrovich, ed. (1908). Ipat'evskaya letopis' Ипатьевская лѣтопись [The Hypatian Codex]. Complete Collection of Russian Chronicles (PSRL) (in Church Slavic). Vol. 2 (3rd ed.). Saint Petersburg: Typography of M. A. Aleksandrov / Izbornyk. pp. 285–301.
  - (modern English translation) Heinrich, Lisa Lynn (1977). The Kievan Chronicle: A Translation and Commentary (PhD diss.). Nashville, Tennessee: Vanderbilt University. p. 616. ProQuest 7812419

=== Literature ===
- Dimnik, Martin. The Dynasty of Chernigov, 1146-1246, 2000
- Dimnik, Martin (2003). "The Princesses of Chernigov (1054–1246)". Mediaeval Studies. 65: 163–212. doi:10.1484/J.MS.2.306502. ISSN 0076-5872.
- Raffensperger, Christian; Birnbaum, David J. (2021). "N. N. Iaropolkovna. b. 1074 – d. 1158". Rusian genealogy at genealogy.obdurodon.org.
- Raffensperger, Christian (2024). Name Unknown: The Life of a Rusian Queen. Routledge. p. 232. doi:10.4324/9781003325185. ISBN 978-1-04-003014-1.
