= Svyatoslavich =

East Slavic feminine patronymic

Svyatoslavich or Svyatoslavych (Russian and Ukrainian: Святославич) is either an archaic or colloquial contracted masculine East Slavic patronymic derived from the given name Svyatoslav. The modern, non-contracted patronymic is Svyatoslavovich. The corresponding feminine patronymic is Svyatoslavna. Notable people with the patronymic include:

- Gleb Svyatoslavich (c. 1052–1078), Prince of Tmutarakan and Novgorod of Kievan Rus'
- Gleb Svyatoslavich (Prince of Chernigov) (c. 1168–1215/1220), Kievan Rus' prince
- Igor Svyatoslavich (1151–c. 1201), Prince of Novgorod-Seversk and later Prince of Chernigov
- Mstislav II Svyatoslavich (c. 1168–1223), Kievan Rus' prince
- Oleg Svyatoslavich, multiple people
- Roman Svyatoslavich (c. 1052–1079), prince of Tmutarakan in Kievan Rus'
- Vladimir III Svyatoslavich (after 1143–1200), prince from the Olgovichi family
- Volga Svyatoslavich, Russian epic hero
- Vsevolod I Svyatoslavich (died 1196), Prince of Kursk and Prince of Trubchevsk
- Vsevolod IV Svyatoslavich (died 1212), known by the epiphet the Red, Grand Prince of Kiev
- Yaropolk I Svyatoslavich (958–978), Prince of Kiev
- Yury Svyatoslavich (died 1407), prince of Smolensk and Bryansk
