= Rostislav Yaroslavich =

Rus' prince (born 1171)

Rostislav Yaroslavich (24 June 1171 – after 1212/before 1223) was a Rus' prince (a member of the Rurik Dynasty). His baptismal name was Ivan. He was prince of Snovsk.

== His life ==
Rostislav was the elder son of Yaroslav Vsevolodovich (who was the prince of Starodub when Rostislav was born), by his wife Irene. In 1192, his father sent him when the Olgovichi (the members of the dynasty of Chernigov) commanded by Igor Svyatoslavich launched an expedition against the Cumans. The purpose of the campaign was to plunder Cumanian camps. The Olgovichi ventured deep into the steppe, but the nomads assembled in great numbers and awaited the princes. Upon seeing he was outnumbered, Igor Svyatoslavich resolutely ordered his troops to steal away under the cover of the darkness.

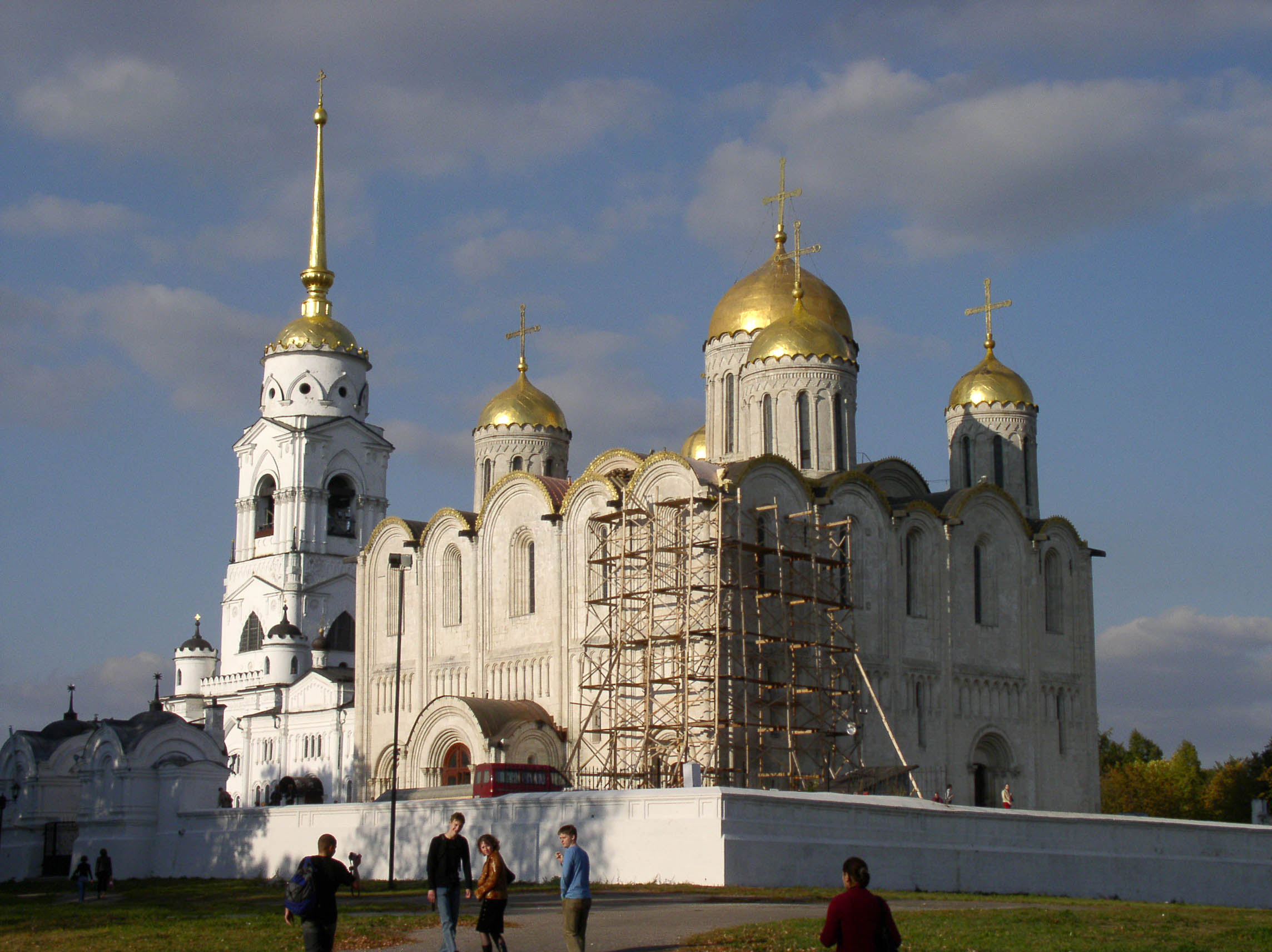
The Assumption Cathedral in Vladimir

On 11 July 1186, Rostislav married Vseslava Vsevolodovna, a daughter of prince Vsevolod Yurevich of Suzdalia. Rostislav was present when Bishop Luka consecrated the Cathedral of the Assumption in Vladimir for his father-in-law. Rostislav took part in the siege of Kiev on 2 January 1203, when Rurik Rostislavich (who had been expelled from the town) and the Olgovichi captured Kiev. During the siege Rostislav captured prince Mstislav Vladimirovich of Dorogobuzh.

Rostislav's cousin, Vsevolod IV Svyatoslavich of Kiev, waged war against the Rostislavichi at the beginning of 1212. Vsevolod Svyatoslavich kicked the Rostislavichi out of Rus', and probably gave Vyshgorod to Rostislav. In June 1212, the Rostislavichi (Mstislav Romanovich and prince Mstislav Mstislavich of Novgorod) launched a major offensive against Vsevolod Svyatoslavich to reclaim their lands. Vsevolod Svyatoslavich and his brothers confronted the attackers at Vyshgorod, but the Rostislavichi occupied the town and captured Rostislav and his brother, Yaropolk. When all the princes assembled in Kiev in 1223, Mikhail Vsevolodovich was the second in seniority among the Olgovichi which suggests that both Rostislav and Yaropolk had died by that time.

== Marriage ==
#July 11, 1186: Vseslava Vsevolodovna, a daughter of prince Vsevolod Yurevich of Suzdalia by his first wife Maria Shvarnovna

== Ancestors ==
Ancestors of Rostislav Yaroslavich

16. Sviatoslav II Yaroslavich, grand prince of Kiev
8. Oleg Svyatoslavich, prince of Chernigov
17. Kilikia von Ditmarschen
4. Vsevolod II Olgovich, grand prince of Kiev
9. Theophano Musalonissa
2. Yaroslav II Vsevolodovich, prince of Chernigov
20. Vladimir II Vsevolodovich, grand prince of Kiev
10. Mstislav Vladimirovich, grand prince of Kiev
21. Gytha of England
5. Maria Mstislavna of Kiev
22. Inge Stenkilsson, king of Sweden
11. Christine of Sweden
23. Helena
1. Rostislav Yaroslavich
3. Irene

== Sources ==
- Dimnik, Martin: The Dynasty of Chernigov - 1146-1246; Cambridge University Press, 2003, Cambridge; ISBN 978-0-521-03981-9.
