= Yaropolk III Yaroslavich =

- Prince of Novgorod
- Born: c. 1174
- Died: c. 1223

Yaropolk III Yaroslavich (after 1174 – after 1212 / before 1223) was a Kievan Rus' prince. He was prince of Novgorod (1197).

== His life ==
Yaropolk was the younger son of Yaroslav Vsevolodovich (who was the prince of Starodub or Chernigov when Yaropolk was born), by his wife Irene.

Vsevolod Svyatoslavich probably gave Vyshgorod to Yaropolk’s brother, Rostislav Yaroslavich, and Yaropolk joined his brother. When the royalty went to in Kiev in the spring of 1223, it's uncertain that Yaropolk and Rostislav had died by that time.

== Sources ==
- Dimnik, Martin: The Dynasty of Chernigov - 1146-1246; Cambridge University Press, 2003, Cambridge; ISBN 978-0-521-03981-9.

| Preceded by Yaroslav Vladimirovich | Prince of Novgorod; 1197 | Succeeded by Yaroslav Vladimirovich |
