= Oleg III Svyatoslavich =

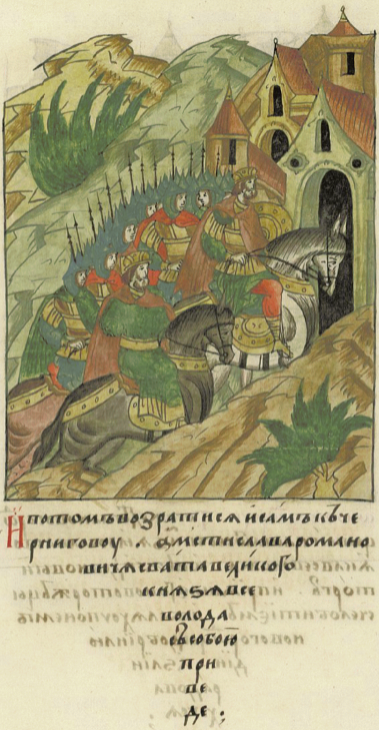
- Oleg Svyatoslavich with the captive Mstislav III of Kiev, miniature from the Illustrated Chronicle of Ivan the Terrible (16th century)

Prince of Chernigov
- Reign: 1201/2–1204
- Predecessor: Igor Svyatoslavich
- Successor: Vsevolod IV of Kiev
- Born: c. 1147
- Died: 1204 (aged 57-56)
- House: Olgovichi
- Father: Sviatoslav III of Kiev
- Mother: Maria Vasilkovna of Polotsk

Oleg III Svyatoslavich (c. 1147–1204) was a Kievan Rus' prince. His baptismal name was Feodosy. He was prince of Vshchizh (1166–before 1175), of Novgorod-Seversk (1200–1201), and of Chernigov (1201/1202–1204).

== Marriages and children ==
Oleg III married his first wife before 1166. She was a daughter of Prince Andrey Yuryevich of Suzdalia and his Cuman wife and may have been named Euphrosyne.

Oleg's second wife was a daughter of Prince Yuriy Rostislavich of Ryazan and may have been named Euphrosyne.

Oleg had three children: one whose name is unknown (died in 1204), a son named David (died in 1196), and a son named Ingor (died between 1211 and 1223).

== Sources ==
- Dimnik, Martin: The Dynasty of Chernigov - 1146-1246; Cambridge University Press, 2003, Cambridge; ISBN 978-0-521-03981-9.

Preceded by Svyatoslav Vladimirovich	Prince of Vshchizh (1166–before 1175)	Succeeded by
Preceded by Igor Svyatoslavich	Prince of Novgorod-Seversk; 1200–1201	Succeeded by
Preceded by Igor Svyatoslavich	Prince of Chernigov; 1201/1202–1204	Succeeded by Vsevolod III Svyatoslavich
