= Gleb Svyatoslavich (Prince of Chernigov) =

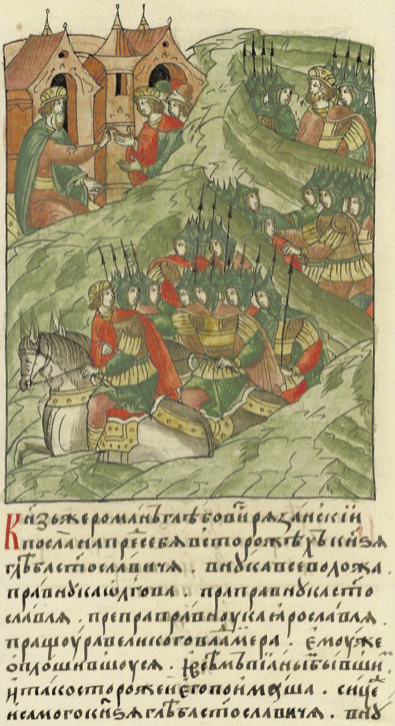
- Gleb's capture, miniature from the Illustrated Chronicle of Ivan the Terrible (16th century)]]

Prince of Chernigov
- Reign: 1206/8 – 1215/20
- Predecessor: Vsevolod IV of Kiev
- Successor: Mstislav II Svyatoslavich
- Born: c. 1168
- Died: 1215/1220
- House: Olgovichi
- Father: Sviatoslav III of Kiev
- Mother: Maria Vasilkovna of Polotsk

Gleb Svyatoslavich (c. 1168–1215/1220) was a Kievan Rus' prince. His baptismal name was Pakhomy. He was prince of Kaniv (before 1192–1194), of Belgorod (1205–1206), and of Chernigov (1206/1208–1215/1220). He helped to pay for the Church of St. Paraskeva Pyatnitsa in Chernigov.

== Sources ==
- Dimnik, Martin: The Dynasty of Chernigov - 1146-1246; Cambridge University Press, 2003, Cambridge; ISBN 978-0-521-03981-9.

Preceded by	Prince of Kaniv before 1192–1194	Succeeded by Roman Mstislavich
Preceded by Vsevolod Svyatoslavich	Prince of Belgorod; 1205–1206	Succeeded by Mstislav Romanovich
Preceded by Vsevolod III Svyatoslavich	Prince of Chernigov; 1206/1208–1215/1220	Succeeded by Mstislav II Svyatoslavich
