= Sviatoslav of Kiev =

Sviatoslav of Kiev may refer to:

- Sviatoslav I (c. 942–972)
- Sviatoslav II of Kiev (1027–1076)
- Sviatoslav III of Kiev (died 1194)
