= Yaroslav II =

Yaroslav II is the name of:

- Yaroslav II of Kiev (died 1180), Grand Prince of Kiev (1174–1175, 1180)
- Yaroslav II of Vladimir (1191–1246), Grand Prince of Vladimir (1238–1246)
- Yaroslav II Vsevolodovich (1139–1198), Prince of Ropesk, Starodub and Chernigov
