= Yaroslav Vsevolodovich =

Yaroslav Vsevolodovich may refer to the following Kievan Rus' princes:

- Yaroslav II of Vladimir, Grand Prince of Vladimir (1238–1246)
- Yaroslav II Vsevolodovich (1139–1198), prince of Chernigov (1176–1198)
