= Oleg II Svyatoslavich =

Prince of Novgorod-Seversk

Oleg II Svyatoslavich was prince of Novgorod-Seversk from 1164 until the year 1180. He was Prince of Putivl (r. 1157–1159, Kursk (r. 1159–1164), and upon his father's death, Novgorod-Seversk (r. 1164–1178).

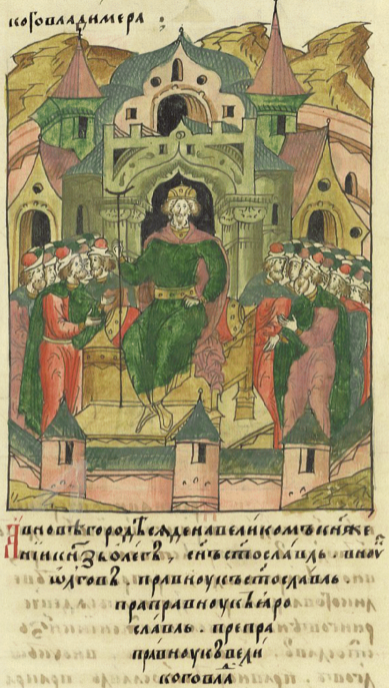
Oleg Svyatoslavich on the throne, miniature from the Illustrated Chronicle of Ivan the Terrible (16th century)

Oleg was born around 1136 as a son of Sviatoslav Olgovich, Prince of Chernigov (r. 1154–1164), and an unnamed Cuman princess, daughter of Aepa, son of Girgen. Dimnik (2003) posited that his mother died while giving birth to him, as his father remarried in 1136 to Catherine of Chernigov. Oleg himself married Maria Yurievna (died 1166), daughter of Yuri Dolgorukiy and his first wife, the daughter of Aepa, son of Osen.

== Bibliography ==
=== Primary sources ===
- Kievan Chronicle (c. 1200)
  - (modern English translation) Heinrich, Lisa Lynn (1977). The Kievan Chronicle: A Translation and Commentary (PhD diss.). Nashville, Tennessee: Vanderbilt University. p. 616. ProQuest 7812419

=== Literature ===
- Dimnik, Martin (2003). "The Princesses of Chernigov (1054–1246)". Mediaeval Studies. 65: 163–212. doi:10.1484/J.MS.2.306502. ISSN 0076-5872.
- Dimnik, Martin (2015). "Prince Svyatoslav Vsevolodovich of Chernigov, Kingmaker in Suzdalia (1174–1179)" (PDF). Сіверщина в історії України [Siveria in Ukrainian History]. Національний заповідник «Глухів»: 95–96.
