= Oleg of Chernigov =

Oleg of Chernigov may refer to:

- Oleg I of Chernigov (died 1115), prince of Chernigov
- Oleg III Svyatoslavich (died 1204), prince of Chernigov
