= Oleg II =

Oleg II may refer to:

- Oleg II Svyatoslavich, Prince of Novgorod-Seversk until 1180
- Oleg II, Grand Prince of Riazan (r. 1389–1402), the Great
