= Ingvar of Kiev =

Ingvar Yaroslavich (Note: Russian: Ингварь Ярославич; Ukrainian: Інгвар Ярославич.) (died 1220) was Prince of Dorogobuzh, Prince of Lutsk (1180–1220), Grand Prince of Kiev (1202; 1212), and Prince of Vladimir-Volynsk (1207). He was son of Yaroslav Izyaslavich, great-grandson of Vladimir II Monomakh.

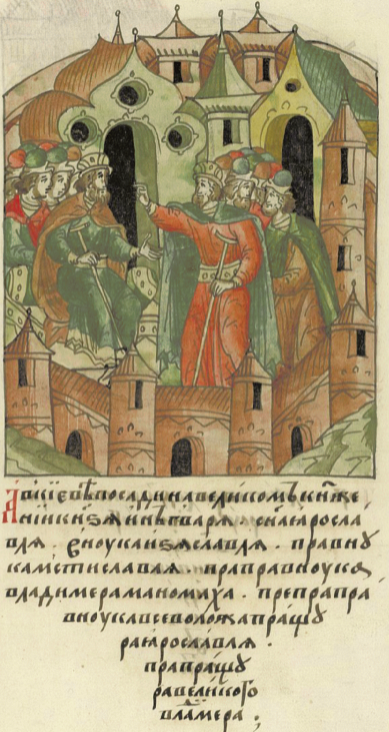
Enthronement of Ingvar, miniature from the Illustrated Chronicle of Ivan the Terrible (16th century)

== Reign ==
In 1180, Ingvar Yaroslavich joined Ryurik Rostislavich in his struggle against Sviatoslav Vsevolodovich of Chernigov. According to the Tale of Igor's Campaign, Ingvar was "six-winged" and is noted for not acquiring his lands by war. In 1183, for instance, Ingvar refused to accommodate Vladimir II Yaroslavich in Dorogobuzh, who had been banished from Galicia. It appears that Ingvar was wary of Yaroslav Osmomysl, Vladimir Yaroslavich's father. Soon after this, Ingvar took the place of his older brother Vsevolod Yaroslavich as the ruler of Lutsk. In 1202, Ingvar was appointed ruler of Kiev instead of the ousted Ryurik Rostislavich in accordance with a deal between Roman Mstislavich of Galicia and Vsevolod the Big Nest, the grand prince of Vladimir. Ryurik, however, would regain Kiev that same year with the help of the Olgovichs and polovtsy. In 1204, Ingvar took part in capturing the city of Vladimir-Volynsk together with Alexander of Belz. He was appointed ruler of the city on the spot, but was soon replaced by Alexander due to boyars' discontent. In 1208–1211, Ingvar sent his son to assist Daniil Romanovich in his struggle against the sons of Igor Sviatoslavich of Novgorod-Seversk. In 1212, Ingvar and Mstislav Romanovich attacked Vsevolod Sviatoslavich and captured Kiev. After a battle near Belgorod, Ingvar voluntarily ceded Kiev to Mstislav Romanovich and left for Lutsk. He died in 1220.

== Family ==
- Izyaslav, prince of Dorogobuzh
- Svyatoslav, prince of Shumsk
- Yaroslav, prince of Peremyshl, Shumsk, Lutsk
  - Borys
- Grzymisława, wife of Leszek the White

== Notes ==
Preceded by Sviatoslav III	Grand Prince of Kiev; 1202 and 1212	Succeeded by Mstislav III
