= Izjaslav Ingvarevych =

Prince of Dorogobuzh from 1220 to 1223

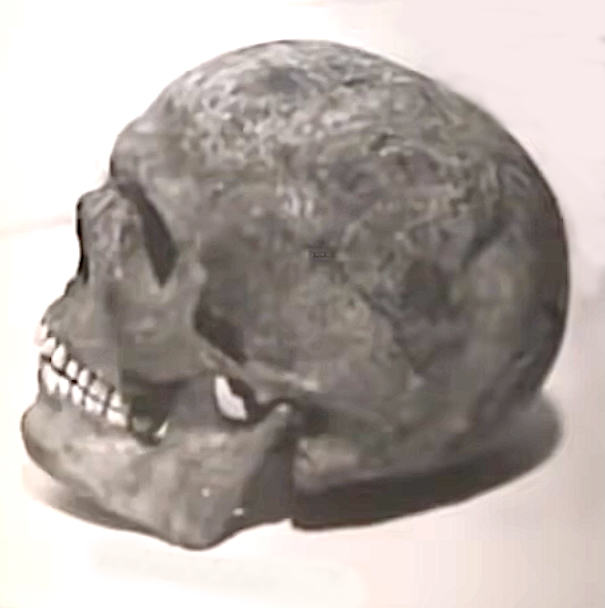
- Izjaslav's skull, discovered in a tomb at Lutsk castle in Ukraine in 1989.

Prince of Dorogobuzh
- Reign: 1220–1223
- Predecessor: Ingvar Yaroslavich
- Born: c. 1180
- Died: 31 May 1223 (aged approximately 43); Battle of the Kalka River
- Burial: Lutsk Castle
- Issue: none
- Dynasty: Rurik
- Father: Ingvar Yaroslavich

Izjaslav Ingvarevych also known as Izjaslav Ingvarevich (born around 1180 and died 1223) was the son of Ingvar of Kiev and was a 13th-century CE Prince of Dorogobuzh in the Principality of Galicia-Volhynia, a historical region that largely corresponds to present-day Ukraine and its surrounding areas. He is a descendant of the Iziaslavichi branch of Rurikid dynasty, a prominent ruling family in Eastern Europe. His great, great-grandfather was Mstislav the Great, a significant figure in the Kievan Rus Rurik dynasty.

== Family History ==
Although details of Prince Izjaslav's life remain scarce, it is generally believed that he was born around 1180 CE and died on May 31, 1223, during the Battle of the Kalka River against the Mongols. He was the son of Ingvar Yaroslavich, a member of the Iziaslavichi branch of the Rurikid dynasty, who held various titles throughout his life, including Prince of Dorogobuzh, Prince of Lutsk, Grand Prince of Kiev and Prince of Vladimir-Volynsk. Izjaslav had three brothers: Svyatoslav Ingvarevich, Yaroslav Ingvarevich, and Vladimir Ingvarevich. His sister, Grzymisława of Luck, was married to Leszek I the White, King of Poland. It is unknown whether Prince Izjaslav was married or had any descendants.

Likely following the death of his father in 1220 Izjaslav was appointed Prince of Dorogobuzh. During this period, the Kievan Rus was fragmented into several semi-independent principalities, which were loosely united under the broader framework of the Rurikid dynasty.

Prince Izjaslav was a direct descendant of Rurik, the legendary founder of the Rurikid dynasty, which began in 862. His paternal lineage can be traced as follows: • Rurik • Igor of Kiev (son of Rurik) • Svyatoslav I (son of Igor of Kiev) • Vladimir the Great (son of Svyatoslav I) • Yaroslav the Wise (son of Vladimir the Great) • Vsevolod I of Kiev (son of Yaroslav the Wise) • Vladimir II Monomakh (son of Vsevolod I) • Mstislav I of Kiev (son of Vladimir II Monomakh) • Iziaslav II of Kiev (son of Mstislav I) • Yaroslav II of Kiev (son of Iziaslav II) • Ingvar Yaroslavich (son of Yaroslav II) • Izjaslav Ingvarevych (son of Ingvar of Kiev)

== Mongol Invasion ==
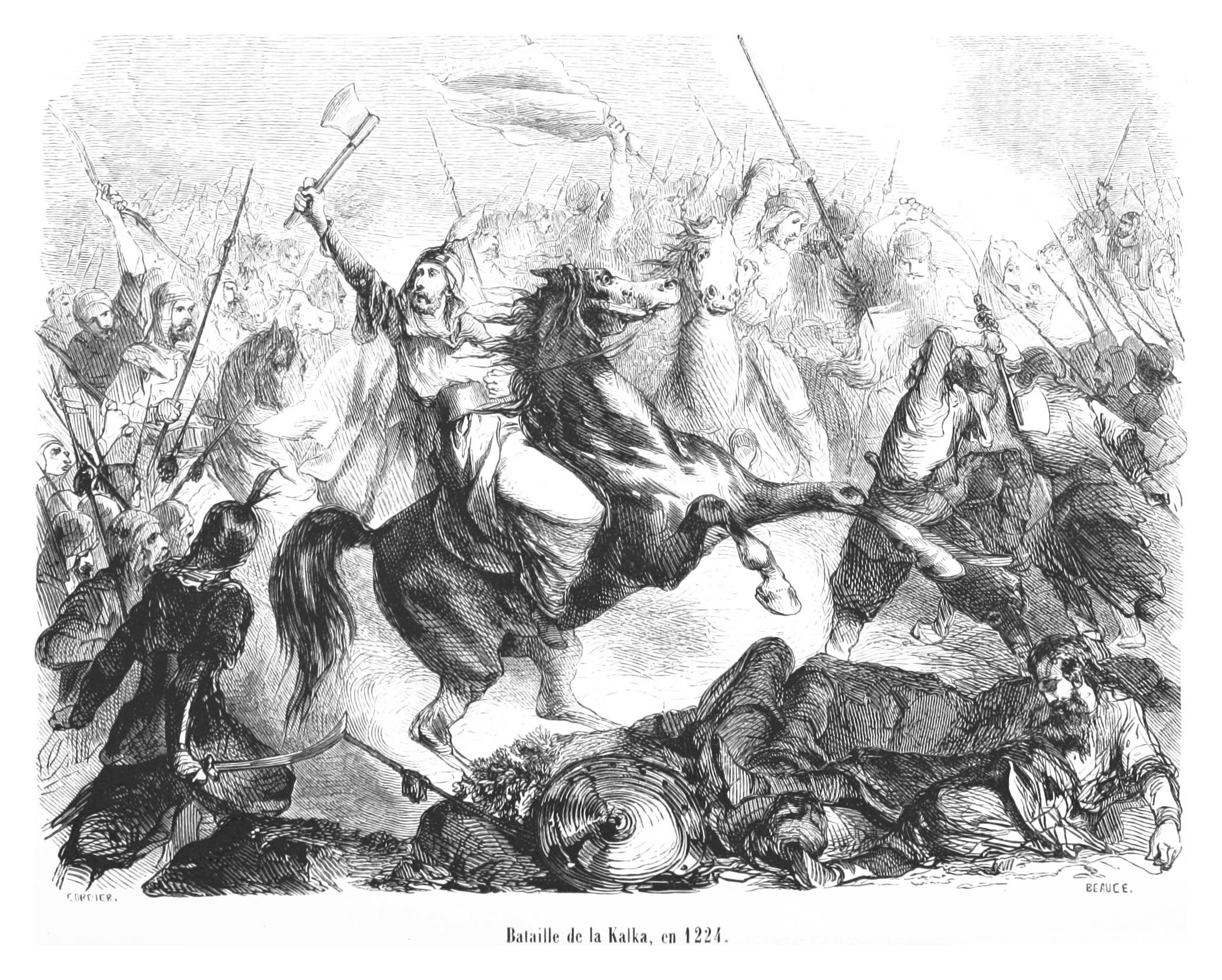
First Mongol invasion of Russia, Battle of the Kalka River

In the spring of 1223, the Mongols began advancing into the frontiers of Kievan Rus and launched an attack on the Cumans. Unable to withstand the Mongol onslaught, the Cumans fled to Rus, warning the local princes of the impending threat. Under the leadership of Mstislav Mstislavich the Bold of Chernigov, and approximately 18 Rus princes—including Mstislav and Grand Prince Mstislav III of Kiev, including Izjaslav —agreed to form an alliance with the Cumans to resist the Mongols.

The first skirmish occurred on the banks of the Dnieper River, where Mstislav Mstislavich led a successful attack against a Mongol detachment. Following this victory, the Rus and Cuman forces crossed the river and marched through the steppes for eight days, eventually encountering the main Mongol army near the Kalka River. Without consulting the princes of Kiev and Chernihiv, Mstislav Mstislavich and the Cumans launched an attack on the Mongols. The battle ended in disaster for the Rus and their allies as their forces were nearly annihilated and thrown into disarray.

During the retreat, Prince Mstislav of Chernigov launched a counterattack with his cavalry, allowing his infantry time to regroup and momentarily halting the Mongol advance. However, the fighting grew increasingly fierce and brutal. During the battle, Mstislav's two nephews were slain, and the Mongols ultimately killed Prince Mstislav of Chernigov. His son, Vsevolod, briefly managed to maintain control, but when he too was killed, the forces of Chernigov continued to retreat across the river.

On the evening of May 31, the Mongols caught up with the remaining retreating Rus forces. In a final attempt to buy time for his infantry to reorganize, Mstislav of Galicia led a desperate cavalry counterattack. During this fierce struggle, Mstislav's two nephews, Izjaslav and Svyatoslav, were both killed in the fighting.

In 1989, a full skeleton with a complete skull was discovered in an umarked tomb within a church inside Lutsk Castle, located in present-day Lutsk, Ukraine. The remains indicated that he died between the ages of 30 and 40, with evidence of a violent death including stab wounds and an arrow wound behind his skull.

Based on the expert opinion of Tersky Sviatoslav, Ph.D., Professor of the Academic Department of History, Museology and Cultural Heritage, Lviv Polytechnic National University, the physical injuries including the tetrahedron armor piercing arrow wound, are consistent with historical accounts of Izjaslav's death during the retreat of the Battle of Kalka.

Prince Izjaslav's body was likely retrieved from the Battle of Kalka battlefield and laid to rest in the tomb within the church at Lutsk Castle.

== DNA Analysis and Controversy ==
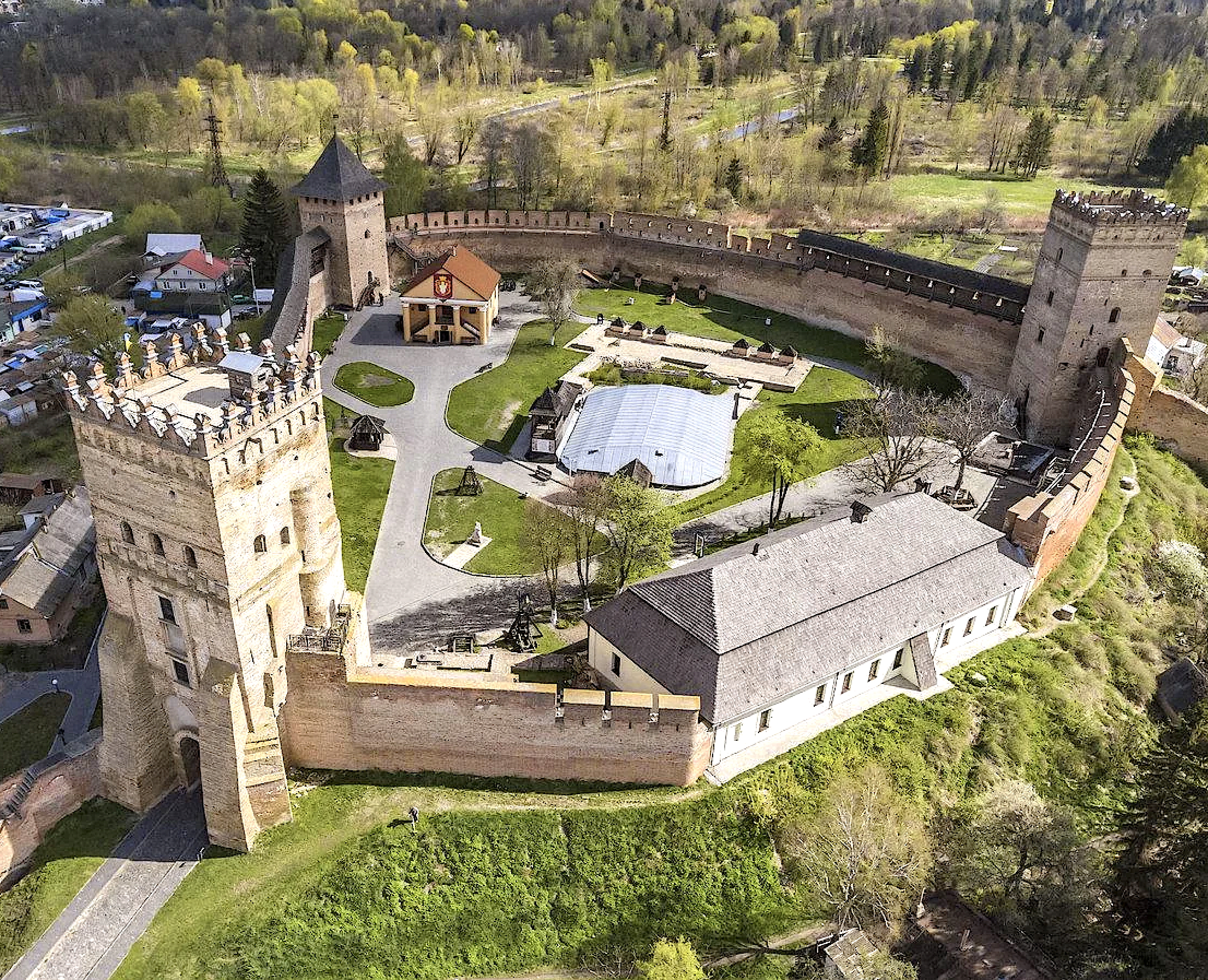
Lutsk Castle, with central church where the tomb of Izjaslav Ingvarevych was found

In 2020, researchers sequenced the genomes of individuals VK541 (Prince Izjaslav) and his contemporary, VK542 (Prince Gleb Svyatoslavich), as part of a study on the genetics of the Viking world. Although they were not Vikings, their genomes were of interest due to the Vikings' significant impact on the genetics and history of Europe, including regions like Kievan Rus'.

The study found that DNA from individual VK541 from Lutsk Castle (presumed to be Prince Izjaslav) Y-chromosome belonged to haplogroup R1a, a lineage commonly associated with Eastern European populations. This finding was significant because it contrasted with the Y-chromosome haplogroups of other members of the Rurikid dynasty, who were predominantly associated with haplogroups N1a and I2a. For instance, genome-wide data of the medieval and modern Rurikids, including Prince Dmitry Alexandrovich , indicate that they belong to the N1a haplogroup of the Y chromosome, starting at least from the 11th century.

The controversy arises from the fact that the Rurikid dynasty has traditionally been associated with specific Y-chromosome haplogroups, particularly N1a and I2a. The identification of an R1a haplogroup in VK541 (Prince Izjaslav) introduces a fresh variable into the genetic history of the dynasty, prompting discussions about the accuracy of previous genetic analyses.

The discovery of Viking burials and the analysis of their DNA in the Lake Ladoga region of Russia, particularly in the area near the town of Staraya Ladoga, has provided fascinating insights into the early Viking presence in Eastern Europe. These burials are significant because they shed light on the early connections between the Scandinavian Vikings and the Slavic populations of what is now Russia.

The most notable archaeological findings are the Viking graves discovered in the 8th to 10th centuries, which contain the remains of individuals thought to be of Scandinavian origin, including some high-status burials. These graves typically include rich burial goods such as weapons, jewelry, and other artifacts common in Viking burials, indicating the importance of the individuals buried there. They also revealed skeletal remains that were often linked to Norse or Viking-style funeral practices, suggesting these individuals had traveled from Scandinavia.

One key aspect of these discoveries has been the analysis of the DNA from these Viking-era burials. The genetic data, particularly the Y-chromosome haplotypes, has revealed intriguing connections. Two Y-chromosome haplogroups, I and R, were found to be predominant in the DNA of individuals buried in the region. These haplogroups are particularly significant because they are commonly associated with populations in Northern Europe, especially those of Scandinavian and Eastern European descent. No N haplotpyes were found in DNA any of these individuals.

• Haplogroup I is typically found in high frequencies in Scandinavia and parts of the Balkans. It is thought to be one of the oldest haplogroups in Europe, associated with early human populations that spread out of the continent during the last Ice Age.

• Haplogroup R especially R1a, is very common in both Eastern Europe and Scandinavia. It is particularly prevalent in Slavic populations and in the Vikings, which adds to the theory of migration and mixing between Viking and Slavic populations in this region.

The presence of these haplogroups in Viking burials in Ladoga suggests that the Vikings did not just pass through or raid these areas; they likely established settlements, integrated with local populations, and even married into them, leaving behind a genetic legacy.

A particularly fascinating aspect of this discovery is the potential connection to the Rurik dynasty—the legendary ruling family of the Kievan Rus. According to historical accounts, including the Primary Chronicle, the Rurik dynasty was founded by a Norse chieftain named Rurik, who is said to have come from Scandinavia and established himself as the ruler of the early East Slavic tribes around the 9th century. The genetic evidence, particularly the presence of haplogroup R1a, suggests that the Rurik dynasty could very well have Scandinavian origins, consistent with the historical narrative of Viking leaders establishing rule in Eastern Europe.

The Viking era burials discovered near Lake Ladoga , combined with the DNA analysis showing primarily I and R Y-chromosome haplogroups, reinforce the idea that Vikings not only raided Eastern Europe but also settled there, intermarrying with the local Slavic populations. The genetic data suggests a direct connection to the early rulers of the Kievan Rus, supporting the historical accounts of the Viking roots of the Rurik dynasty.

Ancient remains sampled for DNA
Burial Individual	Location	Paternal Haplotype	Est. Date
VK14	Lagoda	I-BY3428	900
VK16	Lagoda	I-M253	900
VK17	Lagoda	T-Y138678	900
VK18	Lagoda	R-YP1370 (R1a)	900
VK20	Lagoda	I-Y22478	900
VK22	Lagoda	I-A8462	900
VK23	Lagoda	I-M253	900
VK218	Lagoda	R-BY2848	900
VK219	Lagoda	I-Y22024	950
VK220	Lagoda	I-FT253975	900
VK221	Lagoda	I-Y5473	900
VK408	Lagoda	R-CTS11962 (R1a)	900
VK409	Lagoda	I-DF29	900
VK410	Lagoda	I-M253	900
VK541 Izjaslav	Lutsk	R-YP593 (R1a)	1223
VK542 Gleb	Chernigov	I2a1a2b1a1a2	1078

At least 14 male individuals were found in the Lagoda burials and included in the DNA analysis, dating primarily during the 10th century. Individual VK18 was found to have paternal haplotype R1a, the same y-chromosome genetic Haplotype as VK541 Prince Izjaslav Ingvarevych.

== Historical Matches ==
In March 2024, 23andMe introduced a new feature called Historical Matches exclusively for 23andMe+ Premium subscribers. This product allows users to compare their autosomal DNA test results with the whole genome profiles of individuals who lived long ago, sometimes hundreds or even thousands of years in the past. By analyzing DNA extracted from ancient human remains, users can explore potential genetic connections to ancestral populations and individuals from distant historical periods, offering a deeper understanding of their genetic heritage and ancestral roots. Based on aggregate data, it is reported that 4.1% of 23andMe customers share identical DNA with Izjaslav Ingvarevych VK541. With an estimate of 15 million 23andMe customers, that would approximate 615,000 individuals who are genetically related to the skeleton found in Lutsk Castle, Ukraine. Other commercial DNA services that have matched their clientele to Prince Izjaslav include My True Ancestry.

== Gallery ==
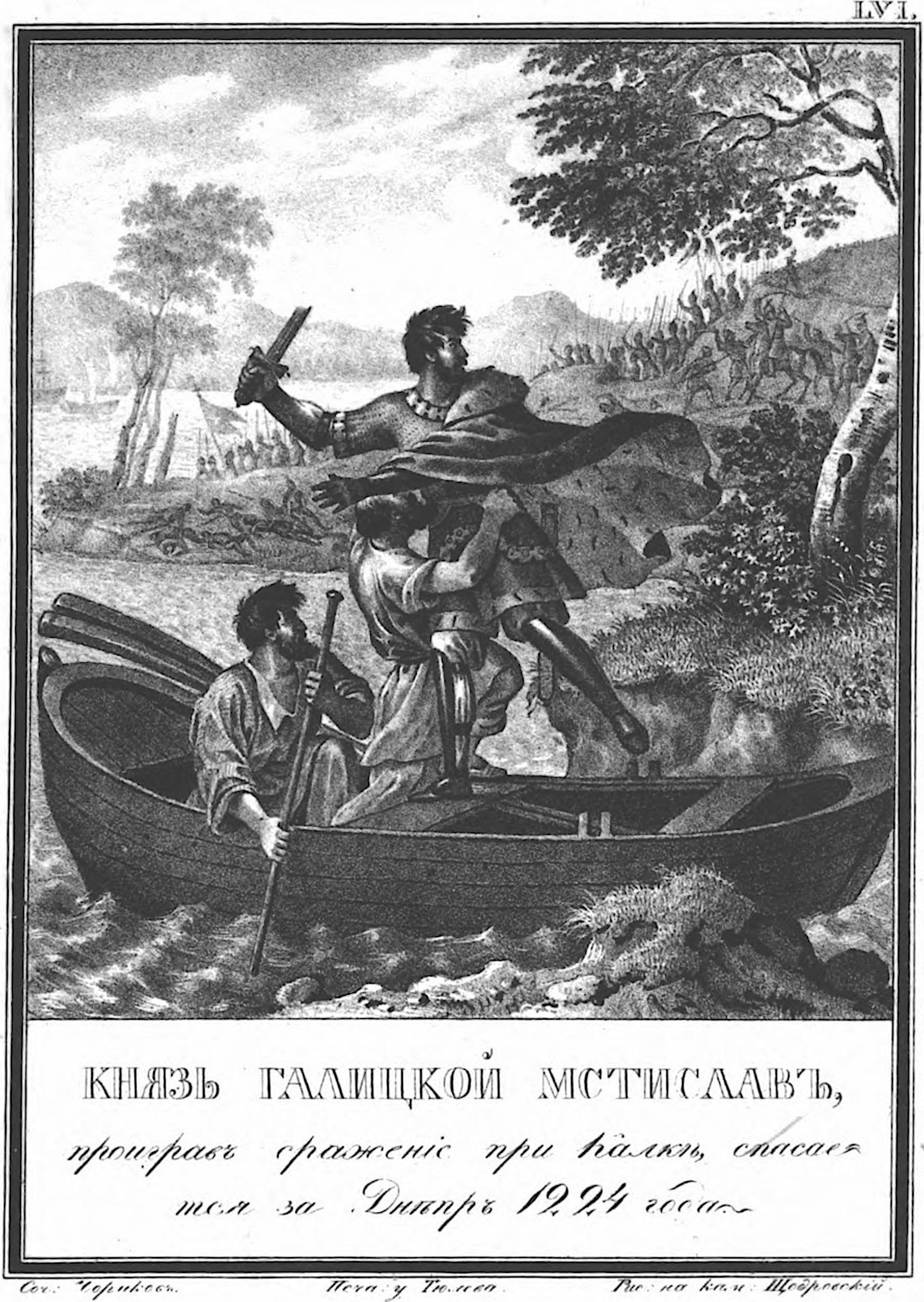
The Flight of Mstislav Mstislavich after the Battle of the Kalka by Boris Chorikov from the Illustrated Karamzin, 1836
