= Svyatoslavna =

East Slavic feminine patronymic

Svyatoslavna or Sviatoslavna (Russian: Святославна) is either an archaic or a colloquial contracted feminine East Slavic patronymic derived from the given name Svyatoslav. The modern non-contracted patronymic is Svyatoslavovna. The corresponding masculine patronymic is Svyatoslavich. Notable persons with this patronymic include:

- Vysheslava Svyatoslavna of Kiev, daughter of Sviatoslav II of Kiev, spouse of Bolesław II the Bold
- Agafia Svyatoslavna, or Agafia of Rus, daughter of Svyatoslav III Igorevich, spouse of Duke Konrad I of Masovia
- Euphrosyne of Polotsk (fl. 12th century), daughter of Prince Svyatoslav Vseslavich of Vitebsk
- Gordislava Svyatoslavna (fl. 12th century), medieval nun and enlighthetner, sister of Euphrosyne
