= Vsevolod IV of Kiev =

Vsevolod IV Svyatoslavich the Red
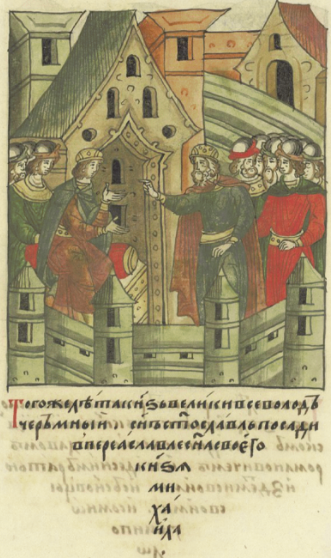
- Vsevolod IV imprisons his son Mikhail in Pereyaslavl

Prince of Chernigov
- Reign: 1204–1206/8
- Predecessor: Oleg III Svyatoslavich
- Successor: Gleb Svyatoslavich of Chernigov
- Died: 1212 or September 1215; Chernigov
- Spouse: Maria Piast of Poland, daughter of Kazimierz II the Just
- Issue: Michael of Chernigov
- House: Rurik
- Father: Sviatoslav III of Kiev
- Mother: Princess Maria Vasilkovna of Polotsk
- Religion: Eastern Orthodox Christianity

Vsevolod IV Svyatoslavich the Red or Vsevolod Chermnyi (Note: Ukrainian: Всеволод Святославич Чермний, romanized: Vsevolod Svyatoslavych Chermnyi. Russian: Вcеволод Святославич Чермный, romanized: Vsevolod Sviatoslavich Chermnyi. His baptismal name was Daniel; Ukrainian: Дани́ло, romanized: Danylo; Russian: Даниил, romanized: Daniil.) (died August 1212) was Grand Prince of Kiev (1203; 1206; 1207; 1208–1212). He was also Prince of Chernigov (1204–1206/1208) and Belgorod (1205).

== Reign ==
In 1183 and 1191 Vsevolod took part in campaigns against Cumans. Around 1204, likely after the death of his brother Oleg Sviatoslavich, he became the ruler of Chernigov. In 1206 Vsevolod usuccessfully fought against Rurik Rostislavich and Mstislav Romanovich for the Kievan throne.

== Family ==
Married: 14 October/24 December 1178/14 November 1179: Maria (renamed Anastasia after her marriage), a daughter of Duke Casimir II of Poland by his wife Helen of Znojmo, a Přemyslid princess.

=== Children ===
- Grand prince Mikhail Vsevolodovich of Kiev (c. 1185 – 20 September 1246);
- Agafia Vsevolodovna (Note: The chronicles do not give her name, but historians generally agree that she was called Agafia. It has also been suggested that Agafia was her monastic name, but this is unlikely as she died with members of her family in the Cathedral of the Assumption to which the Tatars set fire while storming Vladimir (Dimnik, Martin op. cit. 268.).) (died 7 February 1238), wife of Prince Yuri Vsevolodovich of Vladimir;
- Vera Vsevolodovna. On the other hand, Martin Dimnik does not refer to Aleksandr Glebovich as Vsevolod Svyatoslavich's son-in-law and he states that Vsevolod Svyatoslavich had two daughters; wife of prince Mikhail Vsevolodovich of Pronsk.

== Bibliography ==
- Dimnik, Martin: The Dynasty of Chernigov - 1146-1246; Cambridge University Press, 2003, Cambridge; ISBN 978-0-521-03981-9.
- Martin, Janet (2007). Medieval Russia: 980–1584. Second Edition. E-book. Cambridge: Cambridge University Press. ISBN 978-0-511-36800-4.

Vsevolod IV of Kiev Olgovichi Died: August 1212
Preceded by Ingvar Yaroslavich	Grand Prince of Kiev; 1203	Succeeded by Rurik Rostislavich
Preceded by Oleg III Svyatoslavich	Prince of Chernigov; 1204–1206/1208	Succeeded by Gleb Svyatoslavich
Preceded by Rurik Rostislavich	Grand Prince of Kiev; 1206	Succeeded by Rurik Rostislavich
New title	Prince of Belgorod; 1206	Succeeded by Gleb Svyatoslavich
Preceded by Rurik Rostislavich	Grand Prince of Kiev; 1207	Succeeded by Rurik Rostislavich
Preceded by Rurik Rostislavich	Grand Prince of Kiev; 1208–1212	Succeeded by Ingvar Yaroslavich
