= Yaroslav II Vsevolodovich =

Yaroslav II Vseolodovich
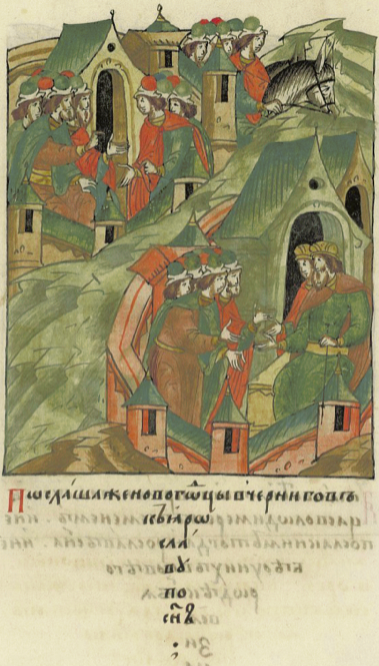
- Novgorod delegation to Yaroslav, miniature from the Illustrated Chronicle of Ivan the Terrible

Prince of Ropesk
- Reign: 1146-1166
- Predecessor: Principality of Chernigov
- Successor: Unknown

Prince of Starodub
- Reign: 1166–1176
- Predecessor: Svyatoslav Vladimirovich
- Successor: Unknown

Prince of Chernigov
- Reign: 1176–1198
- Predecessor: Sviatoslav III of Kiev
- Successor: Igor Svyatoslavich
- Born: 1139
- Died: 1198 (aged 59-58)
- Spouse: Irene
- Issue: Rostislav Yaroslavich; Yaropolk III Yaroslavich; Unknown Daughter
- House: Olgovichi
- Father: Vsevolod II Olgovich
- Mother: Maria Mstislavna of Kiev

Yaroslav II Vsevolodovich (Kiev, 1139–1198) was an Olgovichi prince. He was prince of Ropesk (c. 1146–1166), of Starodub (1166–1176), and of Chernigov (1176–1198).

== Early life ==
He was the second son of prince Vsevolod II Olgovich of Chernigov (who later became Grand Prince of Kiev) and Maria Mstislavna of Kiev (a daughter of grand prince Mstislav I Vladimirovich of Kiev). His father died on August 1, 1146. He began his political career as the prince of Ropesk (a town, located southwest of Starodub).

In 1162, the younger brother of grand prince Rostislav I Mstislavich of Kiev, Vladimir Mstislavich seized Sluchesk, which had belonged to the Olgovichi. On February 15, 1164, Svyatoslav II Olgovich died.

In the spring in 1166, prince Svyatislav Vladimirovich of Vshchizh died, and he evidently had no sons. Svyatoslav III Vsevolodovich as the senior prince of the Olgovichi held the authority to allocate the dead prince's domains, and he gave Starodub to Yaroslav. However, their cousin, prince Oleg Svyatoslavich of Novgorod-Seversk challenged the senior prince's preferential treatment of his own family.

At the beginning of 1168, grand prince Mstislav II Izyaslavich of Kiev asked the princes of Rus' to help attack the Cumans; the Olgovichi sent Yaroslav, his brother Svyatoslav Vsevolodovich, as well as their cousins Oleg and Vsevolod Svyatoslavich.

On March 8, 1169, the strong army of Andrey Yurevich took Kiev, but did not sack it. Mstislav Andreyevich appointed his uncle Gleb Yurevich to Kiev. Nevertheless, when the dethroned grand prince attacked Kiev in February 1170, Yaroslav and his brother sent troops to him.

Oleg Svyatoslavich and his brothers attacked Starodub (Yaroslav's town), while prince Yaroslav Izyaslavich of Lutsk and the Rostislavichi sacked the towns of Yaroslav's brother. However, Oleg Svyatoslavich and his brothers did not manage to capture Starodub, and they accepted peace terms.

== Prince of Chernigov ==
On July 22, 1176, Yaroslav's brother Svyatoslav Vsevolodovich occupied Kiev and promoted Yaroslav to Chernigov.

At the beginning of 1181, Yaroslav's brother, who had been expelled from Kiev, launched a campaign against prince Vsevolod III Yurevich of Suzdalia.

Svyatoslav Vsevolodovich (who had regained Kiev) and prince Rurik Rostislavich of Belgorod countered Cumans who were raiding the Pereyaslavl lands. That summer Svyatoslav Vsevolodovich launched a major campaign against the Cumans, but Yaroslav absented himself from the campaign.

In April 1185, Igor Svyatoslavich invited Yaroslav to a campaign against the Cumans, but Yaroslav did not go and his sons were still too young to fight. Instead, he sent Olstin Oleksich along with the Kovui (the pagan auxiliaries fighting in the service of the Olgovichi) from the Chernigov area. After learning of his cousin's defeat at the Kayala River, Svyatoslav Vsevolodovich requested levies from Yaroslav. After Igor Svyatoslavich had escaped from captivity, he visited Yaroslav and Chernigov to request military assistance.

In the winter of 1187, Svyatoslav Vsevolodovich himself traveled to Chernigov to assemble the dynasty's troops in order to lead a campaign against the Cumans who had pillaged the district of Tatinets, a ford on the Dnieper River. Although Yaroslav joined the expedition and he went as far as the river Samara, he refused to continue and returned home.

His brother died at the end of July 1194 (after 25 July). Shortly before his death, Svyatoslav Vsevolodovich summoned Rurik Rostislavich, indicating that Rurik would be his successor.

In 1195, prince Roman Mstislavich of Volodymyr-Volynskyi commenced to conspire against his father-in-law, grand prince Rurik Rostislavich. When Roman appealed for help, Yaroslav agreed.

The two sides clashed on March 12, and Mstislav Romanovich defeated Oleg Svyatoslavich's troops; however, the princes of Polotsk who had come to Oleg Svyatoslavich's assistance defeated Mstislav Romanovich's men and took him captive.

Yaroslav proposed peace with Vsevolod Yurevich via envoys, and the latter also sent envoys to negotiate with Yaroslav. Vsevolod Yurevich altered the terms of the Rostislavichi to further his own interest: he demanded the release of Mstislav Romanovich by Yaroslav and that Yaroslav break his alliance with Roman.

The Lyubetkiy sinodik states that Yaroslav entered holy orders and took the name Vasily. He was buried in the Cathedral of St. Saviour next to his grandfather Oleg.

== Marriage and children ==
#before 1171: Irene

- Prince Rostislav Yaroslavich of Snovsk (June 24, 1171 – after 1212 / before 1223);
- Prince Yaropolk III Yaroslavich of Novgorod (? – after 1214 / before 1223);
- Unnamed Yaroslavna, wife of prince Vladimir Glebovich of Pereyaslavl.

== Ancestors ==
Ancestors of Yaroslav II Vsevolodovich

16. Yaroslav I Vladimirovich, grand prince of Kiev
8. Sviatoslav II Yaroslavich, grand prince of Kiev
17. Ingegerd of Sweden
4. Oleg Svyatoslavich, prince of Chernigov
18. Etheler of Ditmarschen
9. Kilikia von Ditmarschen
19. Ida of Elsdorf
2. Vsevolod II Olgovich, grand prince of Kiev
5. Theophano Mousalonissa
1. Yaroslav II Vsevolodovich
24. Vsevolod II Yaroslavich, grand prince of Kiev
12. Vladimir II Vsevolodovich, grand prince of Kiev
25. Maria (Irine)
6. Mstislav Vladimirovich, grand prince of Kiev
26. Harold II of England
13. Gytha of England
27. Edith Swanneck
3. Maria Mstislavna of Kiev
28. Stenkil Ragnvaldson, king of Sweden
14. Inge Stenkilsson, king of Sweden
Ingamoder
7. Christine of Sweden
15. Helena (wife of Inge the Elder)

== Sources ==
- Dimnik, Martin (2003). The Dynasty of Chernigov - 1146-1246. Cambridge: Cambridge University Press. ISBN 978-0-521-03981-9.
- Vernadsky, George (1948). Kievan Russia. New Haven and London: Yale University Press. ISBN 0-300-01647-6.

Preceded by (Part of the Principality of Chernigov)	Prince of Ropesk c. 1146–1166	Succeeded by Unknown
Preceded by Svyatoslav Vladimirovich	Prince of Starodub; 1166–1176	Succeeded by
Preceded by Svyatoslav III Vsevolodovich	Prince of Chernigov; 1176–1198	Succeeded by Igor Svyatoslavich
