= Principality of Novgorod-Seversk =

Slavic state in present-day northern Ukraine (1185–1240)

- 1097–1503
- Coat of arms

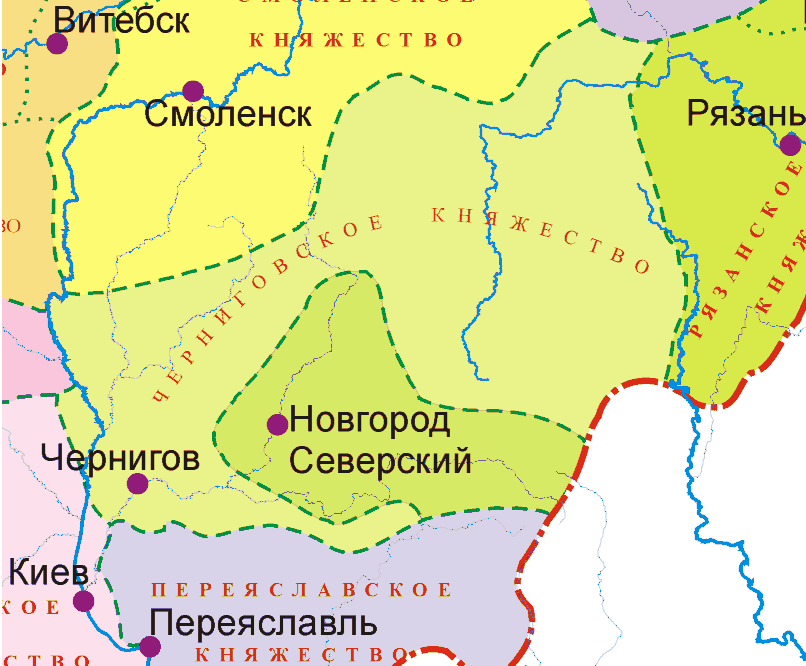
Novgorod-Seversk and Chernigov within Kievan Rus' in the 12th century.
Principality of Novgorod-Seversk
Principality of Chernigov
Principality of Pereyaslavl
Principality of Kiev
Principality of Smolensk
Principality of Ryazan
- Status: Personal union with the Principality of Chernigov
- Capital: Novgorod-Seversk (present day Novhorod-Siverskyi); 52°00′N 33°16′E
- Common languages: Old East Slavic
- Religion: Orthodox
- Government: monarchy
- Prince
- Legislature: Prince
- History
  - Established: 1097
  - Disestablished: 1503
- Currency: Grivna
- Today part of: Countries today: Russia; Ukraine

The Principality of Novgorod-Seversk or Novhorod-Siversk was a medieval Rus' principality centered on the town now called Novhorod-Siverskyi. The principality emerged after the central power of Kievan Rus' declined in the late 11th century, and Sviatoslav Olgovich managed to establish a local dynasty, the Olgovichi, as a branch of the Rurikid house. Novgorod-Seversk was originally a subdivision of the Principality of Chernigov, and would go on to include territories that were earlier part of Chernigov and the Principality of Pereyaslavl.

In 1185, a large Rus' campaign against the Cumans (Polovtsy) ended in defeat for Prince Igor of Novgorod-Seversk, famously recorded in The Tale of Igor's Campaign. After the 1205 death of Roman the Great, the first prince of Galicia–Volhynia, the three sons of Igor seized power in Halych and reigned between 1206 and 1212. The principality was taken by the principality of Briansk after the Mongol invasions, and then by the Lithuanians when the power of the Golden Horde began to decline.

In the fifteenth century the principality was given to Prince Ivan of Mozhaisk when he fled from Grand Prince Vasily II of Moscow.

== See also ==
- Prince of Novgorod-Seversk
- Severia
- Bibliography of Russian history

== Bibliography ==
- Katchanovski, Ivan; Kohut, Zenon E.; Nesebio, Bohdan Y.; Yurkevich, Myroslav (2013). Historical Dictionary of Ukraine. Lanham, Maryland; Toronto; Plymouth: Scarecrow Press. p. 992. ISBN 9780810878471.
- Martin, Janet (2007). Medieval Russia: 980–1584. Second Edition. E-book. Cambridge: Cambridge University Press. ISBN 978-0-511-36800-4.
