= Vshchizh =

Coordinates: 53.420991°N 33.826904°E

Vshchizh burial mound 2006.

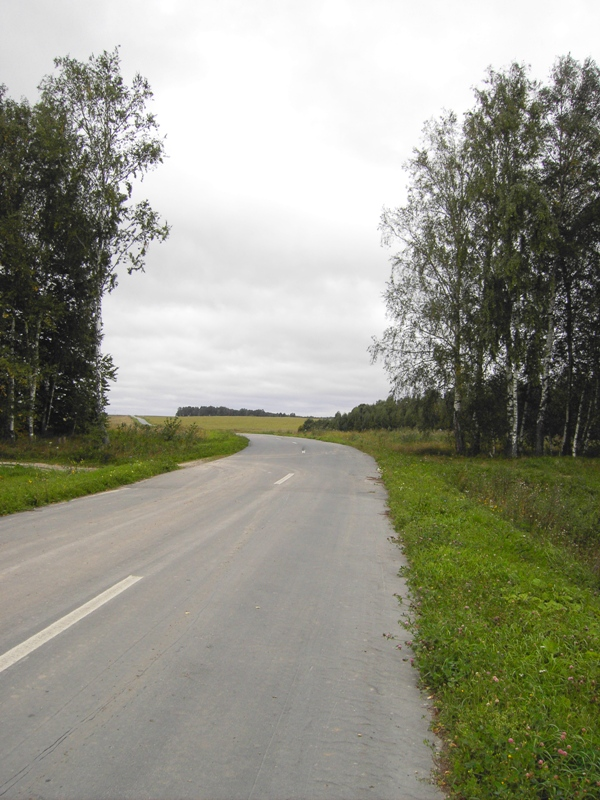
Road from Ovstug to Vshchizh 2006.

Vshchizh (Russian: Вщиж) is a village in the Zhukovka rayon of the Bryansk Oblast of Russia. Now it is a part of the Shamordino rural settlement.

Vshchizh was an old Russian town on the Desna River between the 11th and 13th centuries. It was first mentioned in a chronicle of 1142. In the mid-12th century, it was an appanage town of Prince Svyatoslav Vladimirovich. In 1238, Vshchizh was destroyed by the Mongols. Later, Vshchizh was reborn as a village that exists to this day.

As a result of the excavations in the 1840s and then in 1940 and 1948–1949 (by a Soviet archaeologist Boris Rybakov), the remnants of different buildings and fortifications and a number of artifacts were found. This quiet spot has been Fyodor Tyutchev's inspiration for many of his poems.

== See also ==
- Bibliography of Russian history
