= Rurik Rostislavich =

Kievan ruler (died 1215)

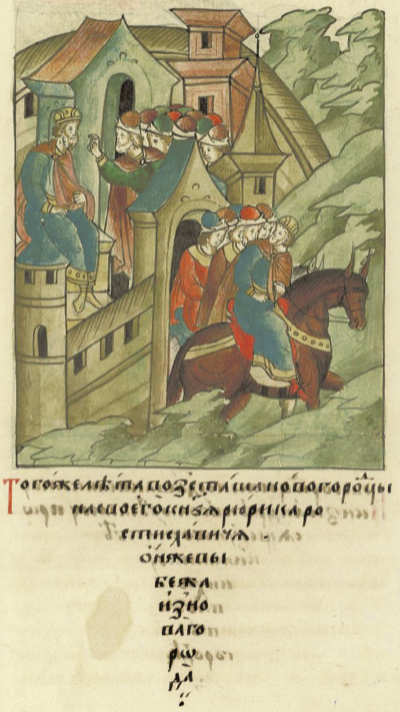
Rurik Rostislavich is expelled from Novgorod Republic.

Rurik Rostislavich (also spelled Riurik; (Note: Old East Slavic: Рюрикъ Ростиславичь; Russian and Ukrainian: Рюрик Ростиславич.) c. 1140 – 19 April 1212) (Note: Other sources state the date of Rurik's death as 1211,1214 or 1215) was Prince of Novgorod (1170–1171), Belgorod (1173–1194), Grand Prince of Kiev (1173; 1180–1181; 1194–1201; 1203–1204; 1205-1206; 1207–1210), and Prince of Chernigov (1210–1212).

== Life ==
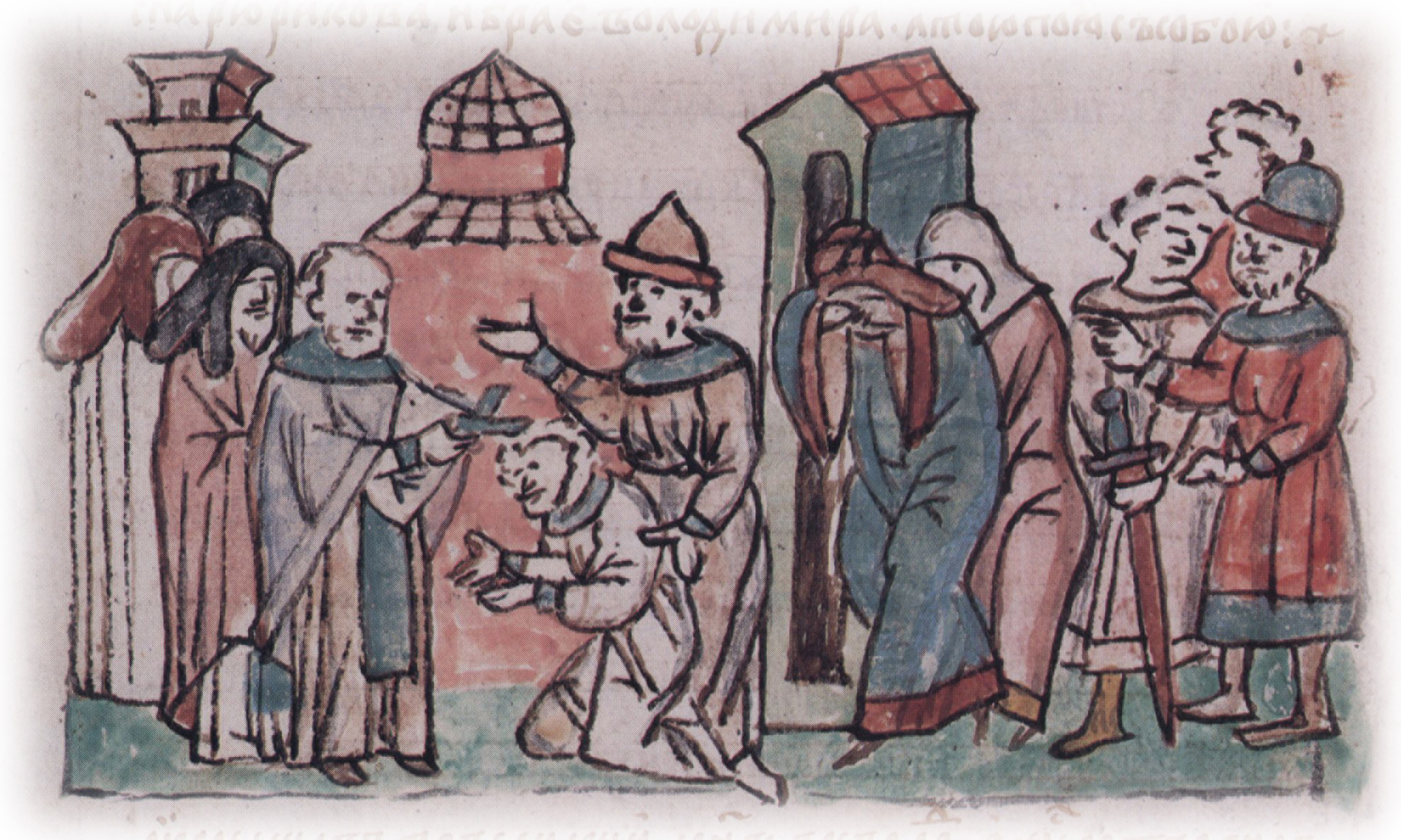
Imprisonment of Rurik in a monastery by Roman the Great

Rurik, also known under his baptismal name Basil, was the son of Rostislav I of Kiev. In the 1160s, he ruled the province of Drevlians before becoming the prince of Ovruch (1168). Succession conflicts intermittently placed Rurik on the throne of the Kievan Rus' no fewer than six times between 1173 and 1210. Between 1173 and 1181 Rurik spent brief periods as a ruler of Novgorod the Great and Kiev.

According to the account in the Kievan Chronicle, Rurik became co-ruler with Sviatoslav Vsevolodovich of Kiev (who had become prince of Kiev in 1177), a "duumvirate" arrangement that lasted until Sviatoslav's death in 1194. According to the Novgorod Fourth Chronicle and Sofia First Chronicle tradition sub anno 6688 (1180) and 6693 (1185), Sviatoslav reigned alone, and there is no mention of Rurik as co-prince. After the death of Sviatoslav in 1194, he became Prince of Kiev in his own right. A conflict with the Olgovichi house, as well as with Galician prince Roman Mstislavich led to his deposition.

The loss of power over Kiev led Rurik to seek alliance with Cumans. After a brief stint in Chernigov, where he built the Church of St. Paraskebas, Rurik, along with his kinsmen and a Cuman army, attacked and sacked Kiev in 1203, but was repelled until Roman's death in 1205. Rurik had been confined to a monastery in 1204, but he abandoned his holy vows and returned to the throne.

His cousin, Vsevolod Chermny, felt that Rurik's previous monastic vows rendered his authority invalid, and so attacked and briefly seized Kiev in 1206, 1207, and 1211. In 1210, Rurik was forced to abdicate the Kievan throne to Vsevolod. For the remainder of his life he governed in Chernigov.

Rurik was married to Anna II of Kiev; among their children was Rostislav II of Kiev.

== Sources ==
- Lenhoff, Gail (2015). "Rus'-Tatar Princely Marriages in the Horde: The Literary Sources". Russian History. 42 (1, Festschrift for Janet Martin). Brill. doi:10.1163/18763316-04201004. S2CID 211599594.
- Martin, Janet (2006). "Calculating Seniority and the Contests for Succession in Kievan Rus'". Russian History. 33 (2/4). Brill: 267–281. ISSN 1876-3316. JSTOR 24664444.
- Martin, Janet (2007). Medieval Russia: 980–1584. Second Edition. E-book. Cambridge: Cambridge University Press. ISBN 978-0-511-36800-4.
- Magocsi, Paul Robert (2010). A History of Ukraine: The Land and Its Peoples. Toronto: University of Toronto Press. p. 894. ISBN 9781442610217.
- Ostrowski, Donald (2018). "Was There a Riurikid Dynasty in Early Rus'?". Canadian-American Slavic Studies. 52 (1): 30–49. doi:10.1163/22102396-05201009.

Preceded by Vsevolod III the Big Nest	Grand Prince of Kiev; 1173	Succeeded by Sviatoslav III
Preceded by Yaroslav II	Grand Prince of Kiev; 1180–1182	Succeeded by Sviatoslav III
Preceded by Sviatoslav III	Grand Prince of Kiev; 1194–1202	Succeeded by Igor III
Preceded by Igor III	Grand Prince of Kiev; 1203–1205	Succeeded by Rostislav II
Preceded by Rostislav II	Grand Prince of Kiev; 1206	Succeeded by Vsevolod IV the Red
Preceded by Vsevolod IV the Red	Grand Prince of Kiev; 1207-1210	Succeeded by Vsevolod IV the Red
