= Maria Vasilkovna of Polotsk =

- Died: 1194
- Spouse: Sviatoslav III of Kiev
- Issue: Mstislav II Svyatoslavich
- Father: Vasylko Svyatoslavych

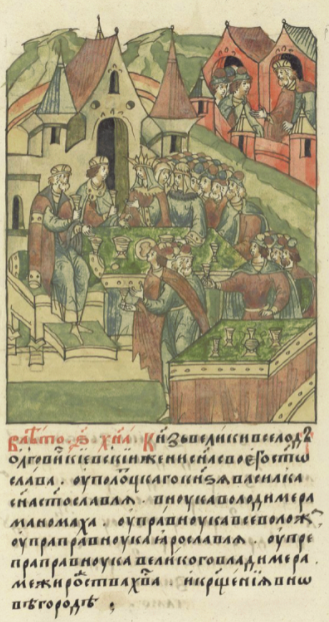
Depiction of her wedding

Maria Vasilkovna of Polotsk (Ukrainian: Марія Васильківна) (?-1194), was a Grand Princess of the Kiev by marriage to Sviatoslav III of Kiev, Grand Prince of Kiev (r. 1174, 1177–1180, 1182–1194).

She had great influence and participated in politics as advisor to her spouse. In 1180, she advised her spouse to form an alliance with the Olgovichi, and participated in the meeting where Davyd Rostislavich was excluded. On her advice, her spouse also forged an alliance with Rostislavichi of Smolensk, which secured stability in the territory during the reign of her spouse.
