= Sviatoslav Olgovich =

- Prince of Chernigov
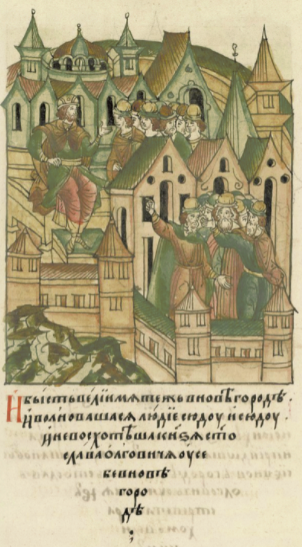
- Svyatoslav on the throne, miniature from the Illustrated Chronicle of Ivan the Terrible (16th century)
- Reign: 1154–1164
- Predecessor: Iziaslav Davydovich
- Successor: Sviatoslav III of Kiev
- Born: Unknown
- Died: 14 February 1164; Chernigov
- Spouse: Cuman princess Aepovna (m. 1108) Catherine of Chernigov (m. 1136)
- Issue: 2, including Oleg II Svyatoslavich
- House: Olgovichi
- Father: Oleg I of Chernigov

Sviatoslav Olgovich (Note: Russian and Ukrainian: Святослав Ольгович.) (died February 14, 1164) was Prince of Novgorod (1136–1138); Novgorod-Seversk (1139); Belgorod (1141–1154); and Chernigov (1154–1164).

== Biography ==
=== Early life ===
Sviatoslav was the son of Oleg Sviatoslavich, the prince of Chernigov, and an unnamed daughter of Aepa, a Cuman prince. In 1108, Sviatoslav married a Cuman princess, daughter of Aepa son of Girgen, with whom he had a daughter and a son, Oleg II Svyatoslavich. In 1136 Svyatoslav married a second time, to the daughter of the posadnik of Novgorod, probably named Ekaterina or Catherine, who bore their son Igor Sviatoslavich, famous from The Tale of Igor's Campaign.

=== War with the Davidovichi ===
After the death of their older brother Vsevolod II in 1146, Sviatoslav and his brother Igor were driven out of Kiev by Iziaslav Mstislavich. Sviatoslav escaped, but Igor was captured and eventually killed in 1147. Sviatoslav fled to Chernigov but was ordered to relinquish his city, Novgorod-Seversk, to his cousins, Iziaslav Davidovich and Vladimir Davidovich. With the assistance of his ally, Yuri Dolgoruki, and his father-in-law, Aepa Khan, Sviatoslav began a war against his cousins, but was forced to flee to Karachev. There on January 16, 1147, Sviatoslav defeated the Davidovichi brothers.

=== Death and succession ===
Upon his death in 1164, his widow Catherine briefly ruled as princess regnant of Chernigov. The reign of Ekaterina or Catherine of Chernigov lasted for a few days, during which she kept her husband's death a secret while she summoned her (step-?)son Oleg to come to Chernigov quickly, and told the city's leading men not inform her brother-in-law Sviatoslav Vsevolodich, who was the rightful heir to the Chernigovian throne. Nevertheless, the bishop of Chernigov betrayed the trust of princess (kniaginia) Catherine immediately, and sent Sviatoslav Vsevolodich a letter, writing that "the kniaginia rules [sedit'] in cahoots with the children and she has many goods." Sviatoslav Vsevolodich soon arrived and made a deal with Oleg, by which the former became prince of Chernigov and the latter prince of Novgorod-Seversk. Princess Catherine is not heard of again until two years later, when she reportedly died on 12 April 1166.

== Bibliography ==
=== Primary sources ===
- Kievan Chronicle (c. 1200)
  - (Church Slavonic critical edition) Shakhmatov, Aleksey Aleksandrovich, ed. (1908). Ipat'evskaya letopis' Ипатьевская лѣтопись [The Hypatian Codex]. Complete Collection of Russian Chronicles (PSRL) (in Church Slavic). Vol. 2 (3rd ed.). Saint Petersburg: Typography of M. A. Aleksandrov / Izbornyk. pp. 285–301.
  - (modern English translation) Heinrich, Lisa Lynn (1977). The Kievan Chronicle: A Translation and Commentary (PhD diss.). Nashville, Tennessee: Vanderbilt University. p. 616. ProQuest 7812419

=== Literature ===
- Dimnik, Martin. The Dynasty of Chernigov, 1146-1246, 2000
- Raffensperger, Christian; Birnbaum, David J. (2021). "N. N. Iaropolkovna. b. 1074 – d. 1158". Rusian genealogy at genealogy.obdurodon.org.
- Raffensperger, Christian (2024). Name Unknown: The Life of a Rusian Queen. Routledge. p. 232. doi:10.4324/9781003325185. ISBN 978-1-04-003014-1.
