= Prince of Chernigov =

Political position in Rus'

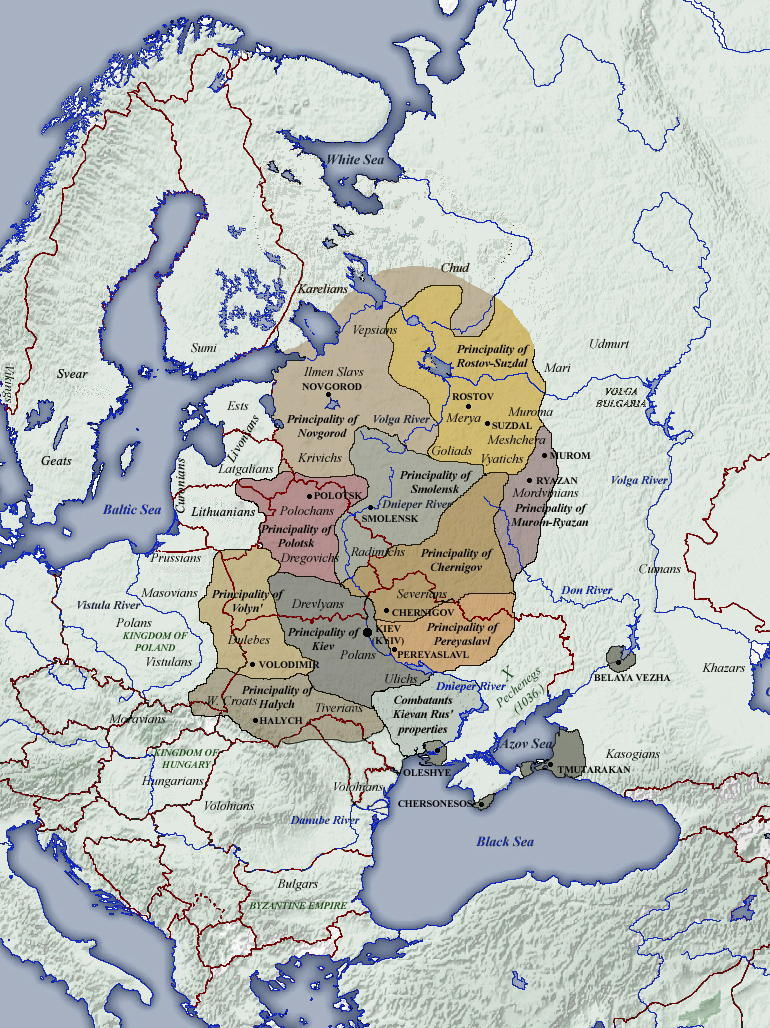
Location of Chernigov within Kievan Rus

The Prince of Chernigov (Ukrainian: Князь Чернігівський, romanized: Kniaz Chernihivskyi) was the kniaz, the ruler or sub-ruler, of the Rus' Principality of Chernigov, a lordship which lasted four centuries straddling what are now parts of Ukraine, Belarus and the Russian Federation.

== List of princes ==
- Mstislav of Chernigov, 1024–1036
- Sviatoslav I, 1054–1073
- Vsevolod I, 1073–1076
- Vladimir I Monomakh, 1076–1077
- Boris, 1077
- Vsevolod I (again), 1077–1078
- Oleg I, 1078
- Vladimir I Monomakh (again), 1078–1094
- Oleg I, 1094–1097
- Davyd Sviatoslavich, 1097–1123
- Yaroslav Sviatoslavich, 1123–1127; sometimes identified with Constantine of Murom (died c. 1129), but whether the two men are one and the same person is uncertain.
- Vsevolod II, 1127–1139
- Vladimir II Davydovich, 1139–1151
- Iziaslav I, 1151–1154
- Sviatoslav II Olgovich, 1157–1164
- Oleg II Svyatoslavich, 1164
- Sviatoslav III of Kiev, 1164–1177
- Yaroslav II Vsevolodovich, 1176–1198
- Igor Sviatoslavich the Brave, 1198–1201/1202
- Oleg III Sviatoslavich, 1201/1202–1204
- Vsevolod III Svyatoslavich, 1204–1206/1208
- Gleb I Sviatoslavich, 1206/1208–1215/1220
- Mstislav II Svyatoslavich, 1215/1220–1223
- Saint Mikhail I Vsevolodovich, 1223–1235 (for the first time)
- Mstislav III Glebovich, 1235–1239/1241
- Rostislav I Mikhailovich, 1241–1242
- Saint Mikhail I Vsevolodovich, 1242–1246 (for the second time)
- Roman I Mikhailovich the Old, 1246/1247 – after 1288
- Oleg IV Romanovich, 13th century
- Mikhail II, late 13th – early 14th century
- Mikhail III Aleksandrovich, 14th century
- Roman II Mikhailovich (the younger), died 1370
- "Dmitry" Kaributas Algirdaitis (Koribut or Korybut), c. 1372–1393
- Roman II Mikhailovich (the younger), restored, 1393–1401
- Absorbed by the Lithuanians, c. 1401

== See also ==
- Prince of Novgorod-Seversk

== Sources ==
- Dimnik, Martin (1994). The Dynasty of Chernigov, 1054–1146. Pontifical Institute of Mediaeval Studies. ISBN 0-88844-116-9.
- Franklin, Simon; Shepard, Jonathan (1996). The Emergence of Rus 750–1200. Longman. ISBN 0-582-49091X.
- Martin, Janet (1993). Medieval Russia, 980–1584. Cambridge University Press. ISBN 978-0-521-67636-6.
- Vernadsky, George (1948). A History of Russia, Volume II: Kievan Russia. Yale University Press. ISBN 0-300-01647-6.
