= Sviatoslav III of Kiev =

Sviatoslav III
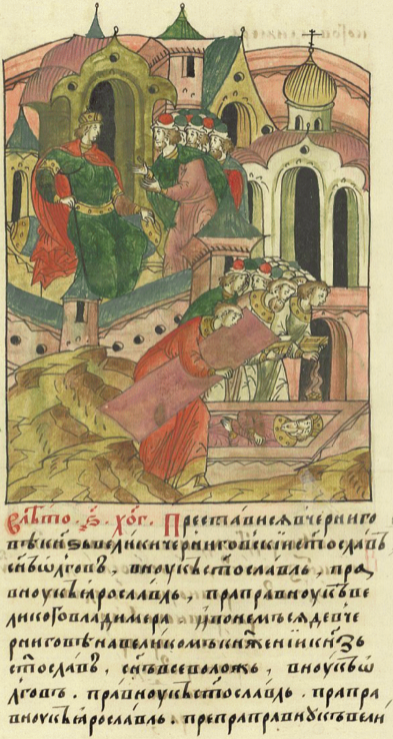
- Svyatoslav III on the throne in Kiev, miniature from the Illustrated Chronicle of Ivan the Terrible (16th century)

Prince of Chernigov
- Reign: 1164–1177
- Predecessor: Sviatoslav Olgovich
- Successor: Yaroslav II Vsevolodovich
- Born: 1126; Chernigov
- Died: 27 July 1194 (aged 67–68); Kiev
- Spouse: Maria Vasilkovna of Polotsk
- Issue: Vsevolod IV of Kiev; Oleg III Svyatoslavich; Gleb Svyatoslavich
- House: Rurik
- Father: Vsevolod II Olgovich
- Mother: Maria Mstislavna of Kiev
- Religion: Eastern Orthodox Christianity

Sviatoslav III Vsevolodovich (Note: Russian and Ukrainian: Святослав III Всеволодич) (died 1194) was Prince of Turov (1142 and 1154), Volhynia (1141–1146), Pinsk (1154), Novgorod-Seversk (1157–1164), Chernigov (1164–1177), Grand Prince of Kiev (1174; 1177–1180; 1182–1194). He was the son of Vsevolod II Olgovich.

He succeeded in taking the Kievan throne from Yaroslav II, and ruled Kiev alongside Rurik Rostislavich until his death. The co-princedom did not go smoothly and there were disagreements between Sviatoslav and Rurik, until Sviatoslav was taken ill and died on 27 July 1194.

== Notes ==
Sviatoslav III of Kiev Olgovichi Born: ???? Died: 1194
Preceded by Rurik Rostislavich	Grand Prince of Kiev; 1174	Succeeded by Yaroslav II
Preceded by Roman I	Grand Prince of Kiev; 1177-1180	Succeeded by Yaroslav II
Preceded by Rurik Rostislavich	Grand Prince of Kiev; 1182-1194	Succeeded by Rurik Rostislavich
