= Prince of Novgorod-Seversk =

Prince of Novgorod-Seversk was the kniaz (Note: Ukrainian: Князь Новгород-Сіверський, romanized: Kniaz Novhorod-Siverskyi), the ruler or sub-ruler, of the Principality of Novgorod-Seversk. It may have been created in 1139, the date of one modern authority, and is most famous for Igor Sviatoslavich, hero of the Old East Slavic Tale of Igor's Campaign.

== List of princes ==
- Oleg I of Chernigov (1097–1115), previously Prince of Chernigov (1094–1097), progenitor of the Olgovichi clan
- Sviatoslav Olgovich (d. 1164), Prince of Novgorod (1136–1138) and Novgorod-Seversky (1139)
- Oleg Sviatoslavich, d. 1180
- Igor Sviatoslavich, d. 1202
- Vladimir Igorevich, d. 1208
- Roman Igorevich, d. 1211
- Oleg Igoreivich

In the aftermath of the Mongol invasions, it fell under the control of Briansk. The principality was taken over by the Lithuanians in the fourteenth century when the power of the Golden Horde began to decline. In the fifteenth century the principality was given to Prince Ivan of Mozhaisk when he fled from Grand Prince Vasily II.

Under Lithuanian overlordship

- Ivan Dmitrievich of Mozhaisk, d. 1471 x 1485
- Semen Ivanovich, d. x 1500
- Vasily Ivanovich, d. 1519
