= Bilhorod Kyivskyi =

Ruined city-castle of Kievan Rus'

Coordinates: 50.383499°N 30.216672°E

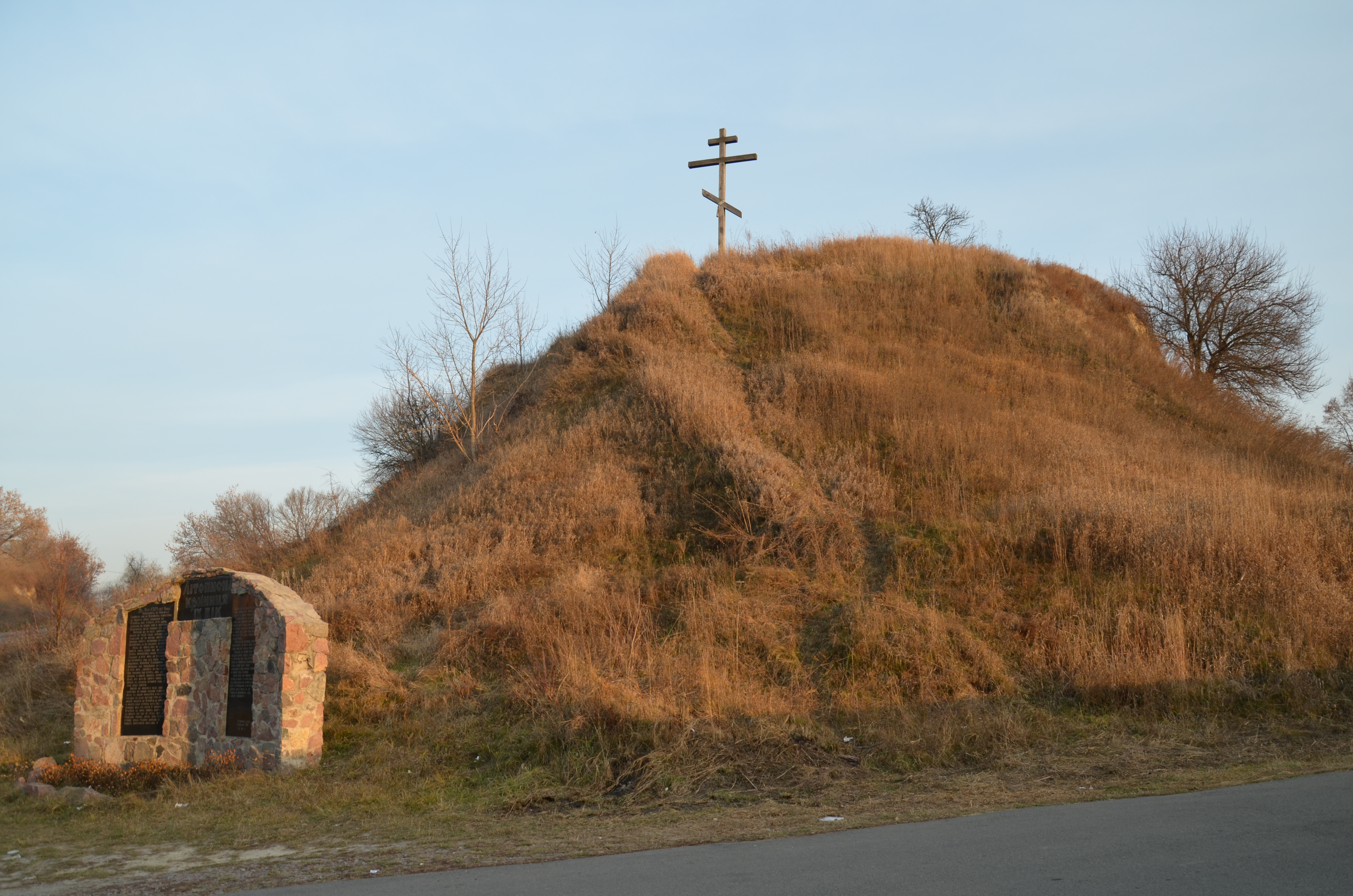
- Remains of Bilhorod Castle in the modern village of Bilohorodka
- Interactive map of Bilhorod Kyivskyi

History
- Abandoned: 13th century

Immovable Monument of National Significance of Ukraine
- Official name: Городище літописного міста Білгорода і могильник (Hillfort of the legendary city of Bilhorod and its grave field)
- Type: Archaeology
- Reference no.: 100011-Н

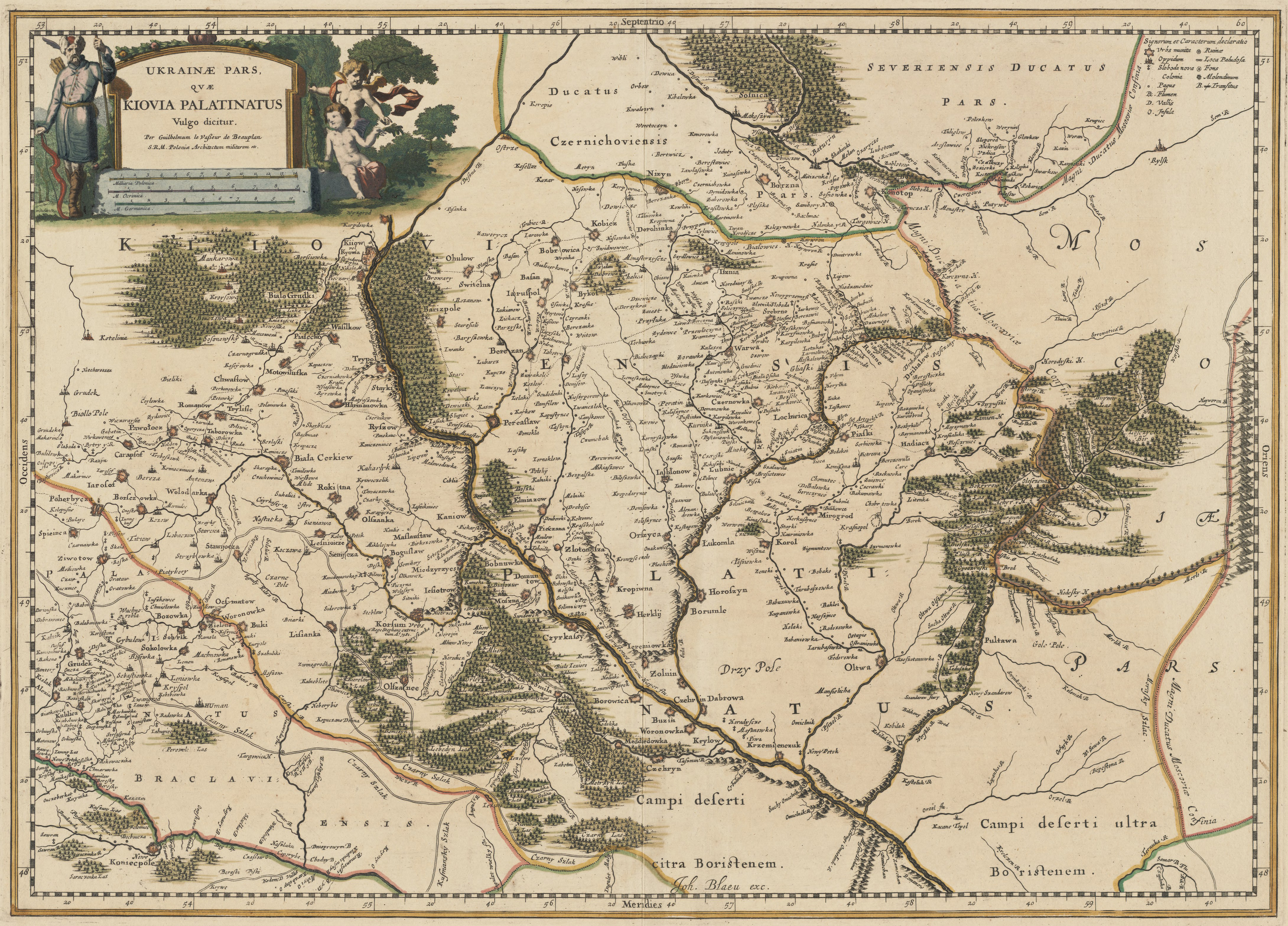
The 1660s map of Kiovia Palatinatus by Guillaume Le Vasseur de Beauplan with a big star fortress Bialo Grudki just west of Pieczary Monastery

Bilhorod Kyivskyi (Ukrainian: Білгород-Київський) or Belgorod (Russian: Белгород) was a city-castle in Kievan Rus', on the right bank of the Irpin River. Established in 991, it stood on the roadway connecting Kyiv with the cities of Zhytomyr and Halych, but was destroyed by the Tatars. The remains of the city are located near the present-day village of Bilohorodka in Kyiv Oblast, Ukraine.

== History ==
The city was prominent in the 10th to 12th centuries. It ceased to exist after the Mongol invasion of Kievan Rus' and the destruction of Kiev in 1240. Currently the large village of Bilohorodka is located near the defunct city.

=== Kievan Rus' ===
The city is first mentioned in chronicles in 980. In 991, Vladimir I of Kiev built his castle there. According to the chronicle, Belgorod was the favourite residence of Vladimir I, who moved a lot of his people there, including his three hundred concubines. The right bank of the Irpin River was the land of Drevlians who resisted the Kievan princes, thus, establishment of the castle might have been intended to consolidate the power of Kiev over the Drevlians. The castle also protected Kiev from the nomads of the Great Steppe.

In 997, the new castle survived the long siege by the Pechenegs and protected Kiev from Pecheneg conquest. According to the Primary Chronicle, there was a famine in the city during the siege and the residents assembled a veche or assembly to decide whether they should surrender to the Pechenegs. The veche decided to continue the defence of the city that eventually led to the victory. It was the first mention of veche in Kievan chronicles. Later, the veche became the main form of government in the Novgorod Republic and other states in northern Rus'.

In the 11th century, the city became a bishop seat. The bishop of Belgorod was first mentioned in the Primary Chronicle in 1088. In the 12th century, the city played the same role as earlier Pereyaslavl and Novgorod; it became the seat of the heir of the grand prince of Kiev. Since Belgorod was very close to Kiev, the grand prince could control his heir and the heir could move to Kiev on a very short notice if required. The tradition started with Vladimir II Monomakh, who transferred his son Mstislav there in 1117. Mstislav became the grand prince in 1125. In 1140, the city was taken by Vsevolod II of Kiev, who gave it to his brother, Sviatoslav Olgovich. In 1146, Belgorod was taken by Iziaslav II of Kiev, who became the grand prince in 1151. In 1159, Belgorod became the seat of Mstislav II of Kiev, who became the grand prince in 1167.

The most prosperity the city achieved was under Rurik Rostislavich, the ruler of Kievan Rus', who made the city his capital. In the 13th century, after the Mongol invasion of Rus', Belgorod degraded, and after the destruction of Kiev in 1240, Belgorod ceased to exist.

=== Present ===
To this day, there is still the village of Bilohorodka near the ruins of the city, which keeps its name.

The ruins of the city (the Horodyshche) is a place of important archaeological excavation. Most of it is not excavated yet. The area of Horodyshche is 110 hectares. According to historian A. Chlenov, the place is particularly important as it is the only Drevlian fortress surviving almost intact, the only fortress of 10th century Rus' of such preservation, and the largest surviving fortress of that epoch.

== Gallery ==
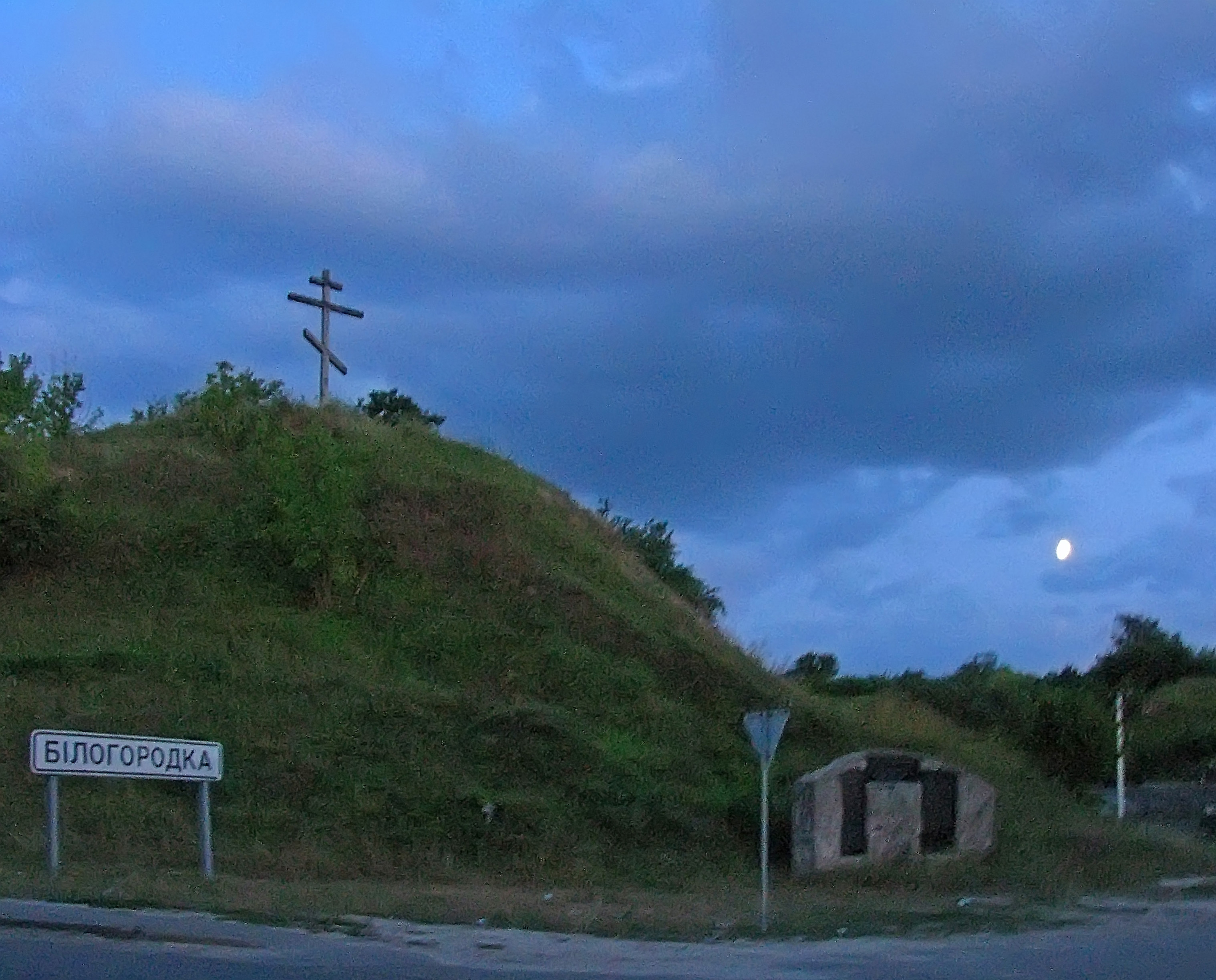
Fortress hill with the remains of a 1000-year-old rampart

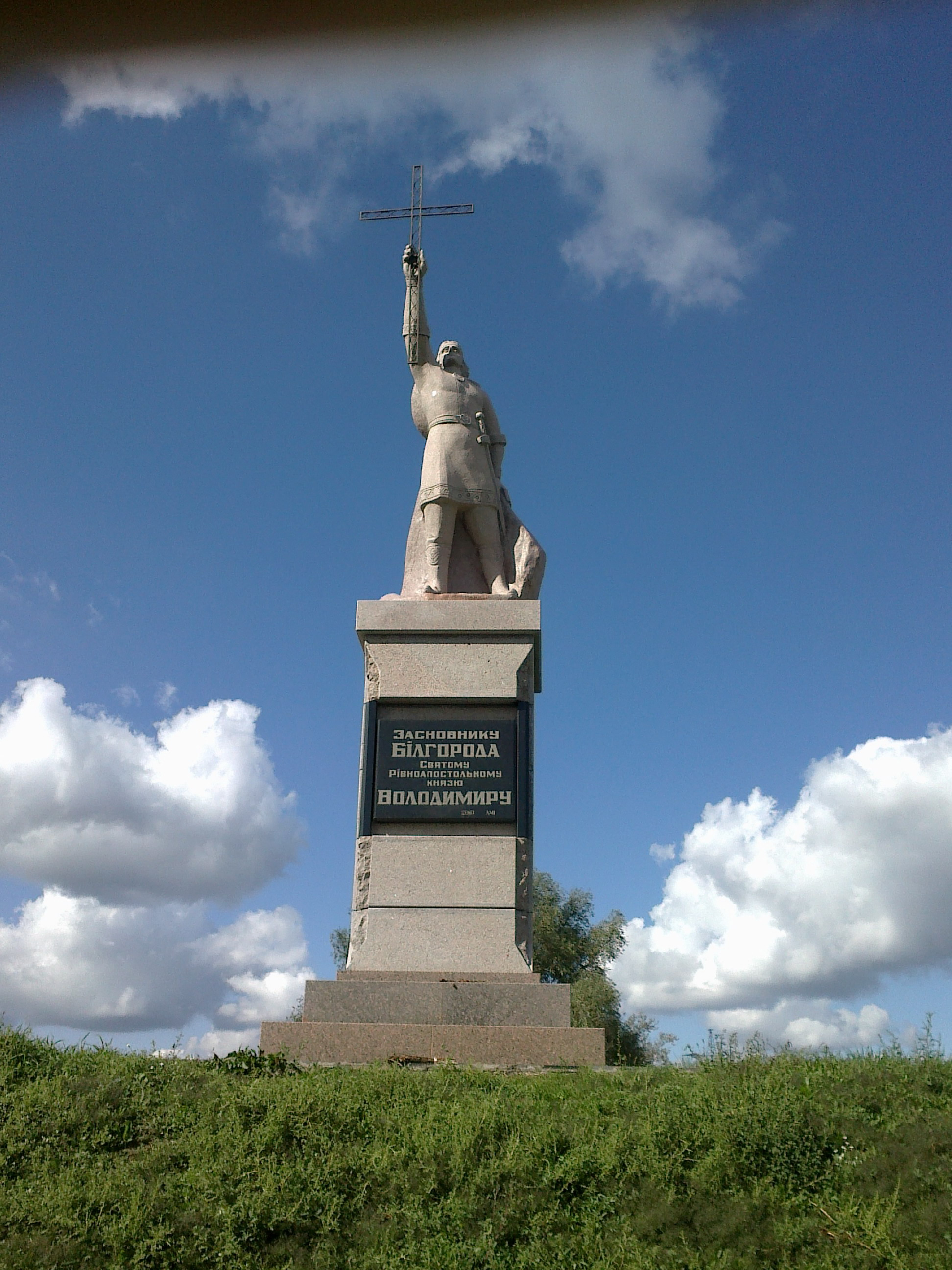
On the rampart. Monument to Prince Volodymyr – the founder of the city

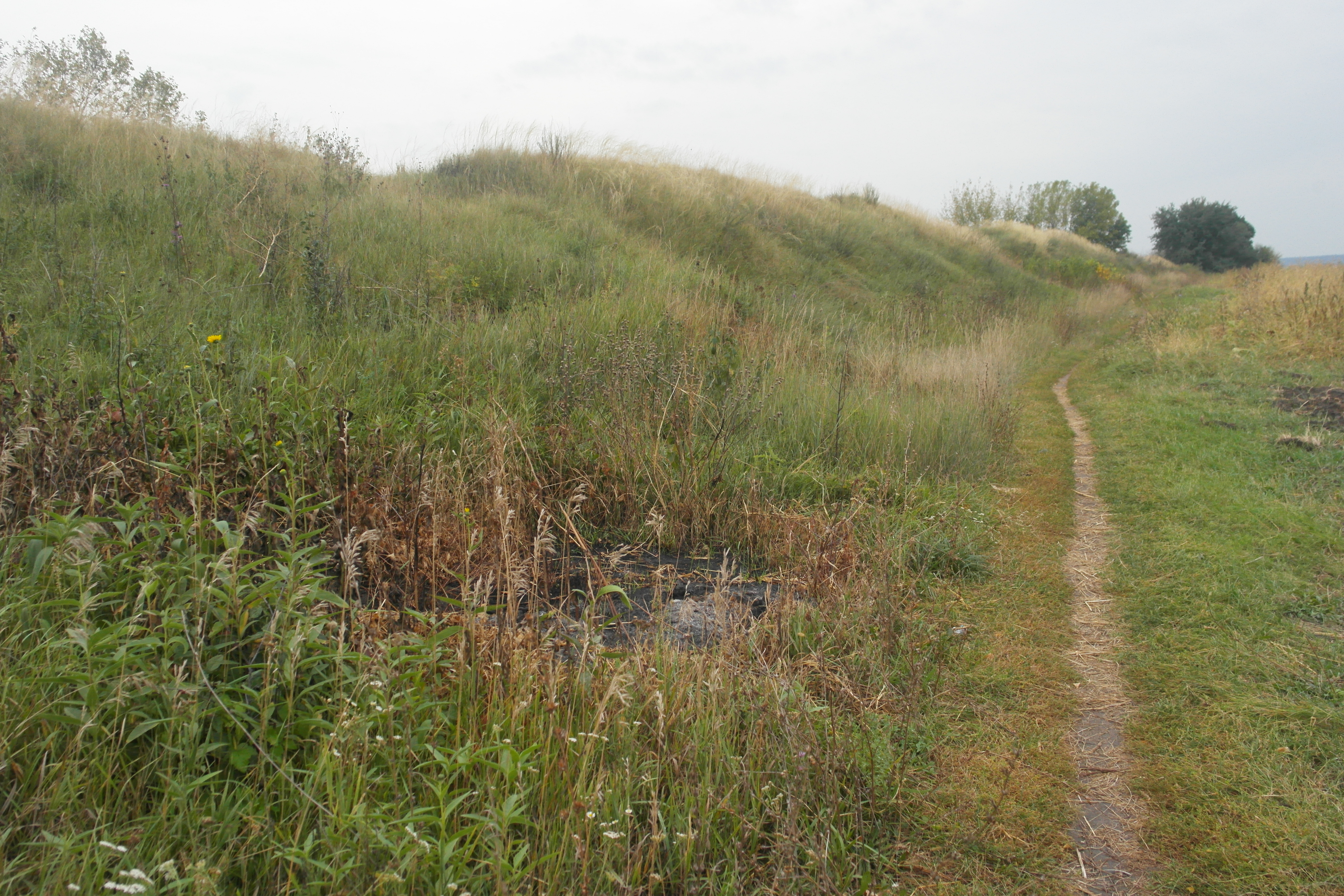
The rampart of the city

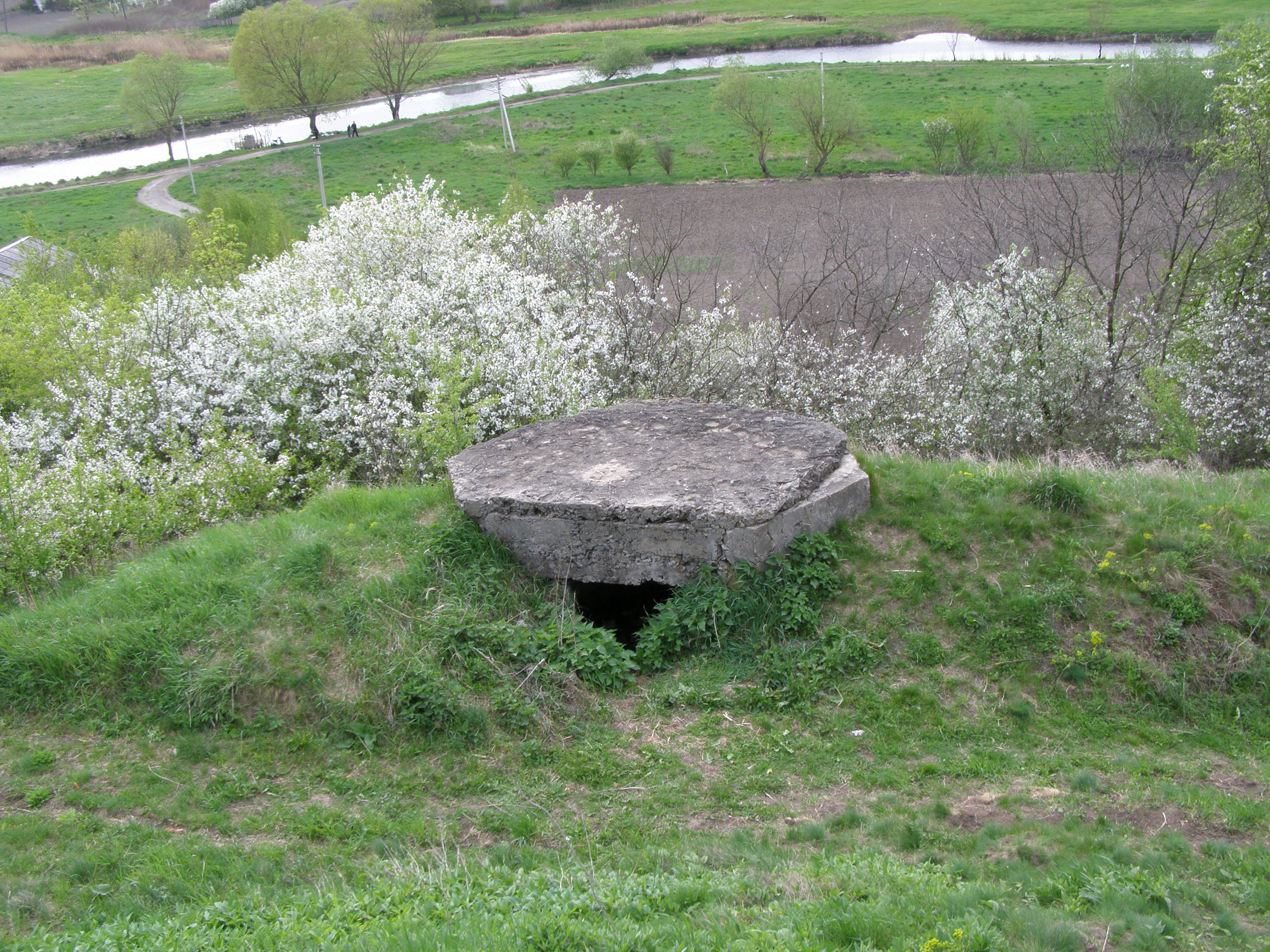
Machine gun nest type "Barbet" №380 in an old rampart. Monument of history and technology

== Sources ==
- Мезенцева Г.Г. Дослідження Київського університету в Білгородці. – Матеріали 13-ї конференції Ін-ту археології АН УРСР, К., 1972 р., с. 324 – 325.
- Мезенцева Г.Г. Дослідження древнього Білгорода. – 15-а наукова конференція Інституту археології АН УРСР, К., 1972 р., с. 334 – 336.
- Кучера М.П. Звіт про роботу розвідзагону по обстеженню городищ Київщини у 1973 р. // НА ІА НАН України. — 1973/18а.
- Ліньова Є.А. Давньоруське м. Білгород // Археологія. — № 48. — К., 1984.
- Ліньова Є.А. Гончарне виробництво на посаді Білгорода-Київського // Вісник КДУ: Історичні науки. — вип.22. — Київ. — 1980. — с.80-91;
- Непомящих В.Ю. Білгород-Київський: питання історіографії // Проблеми археології Середнього Подніпров'я. — Фастів, 2005. — С. 314—319.
- Непомящих В.Ю. Житлобудування Білгорода-Київського за результатами археологічних досліджень. // Стародавній Іскоростень і слов'янські гради. — Т. 2. — Коростень, 2008.
- Непомящих В.Ю. Палеоботанічні знахідки з Білгорода-Київського (за результатами археологічних досліджень 1972 та 1976 рр.) // Середньовічні міста Полісся. Археологія і давня історія України. Вип. 11. Київ. 2013. – С. 127–133.
- Непомящих В.Ю. Вивчення та датування культурних нашарувань Білгорода-Київського // Південноруське місто у системі міжцивілізаційних контактів. Археологія і давня історія України № 4 (21). – Київ, 2016. – С. 93–103.
- Непомящих В.Ю. Білгород-Київський: питання виникнення // Емінак: науковий щоквартальник. – 2017. – № 1 (17). – Т. 1. – С. 5–11.
- Непомящих В.Ю. Білгород Київський (Х — перша половина ХІІІ ст.). – Кваліфікаційна наукова праця на правах рукопису – Інститут археології НАН України, — Київ, — 2017.
- Асєєв Ю. Собор Апостолів у Білгороді // Образотворче мистецтво. — № 1. — Київ, 1970. — С. 32—33.
