= Principality of Chernigov =

Medieval East European state

Coordinates: 51°30′N 32°0′E

- 1024–1402
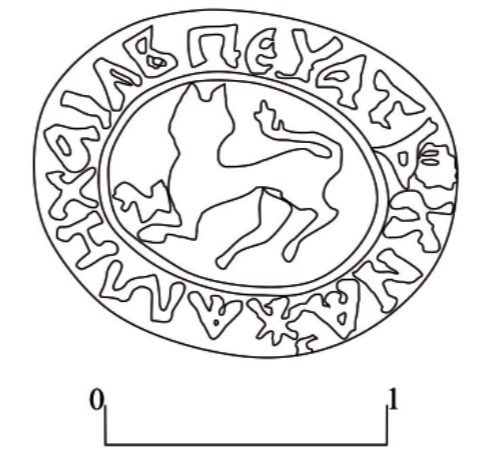
- Signature of Michael of Chernigov

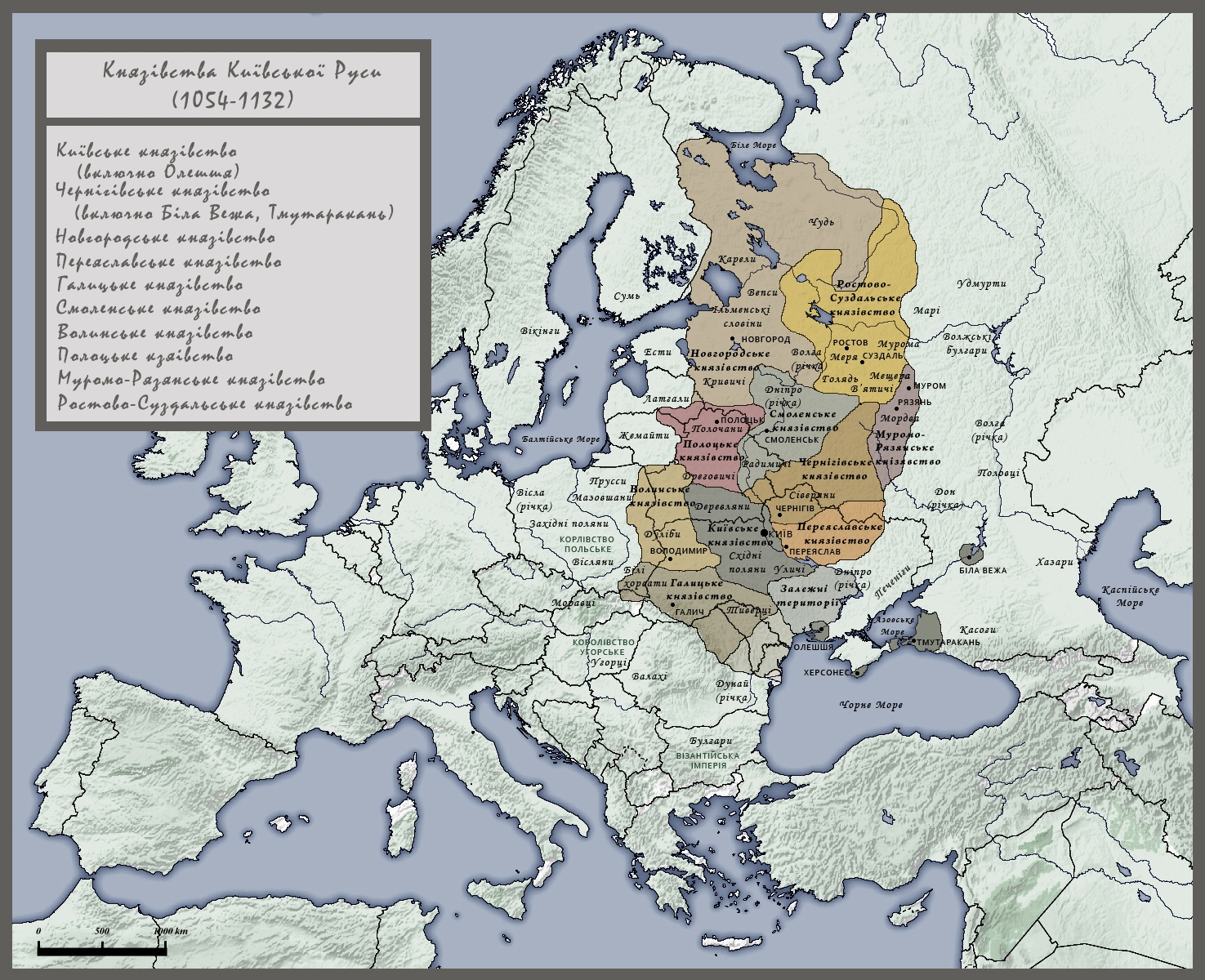
- Principality of Chernigov in 1054–1132

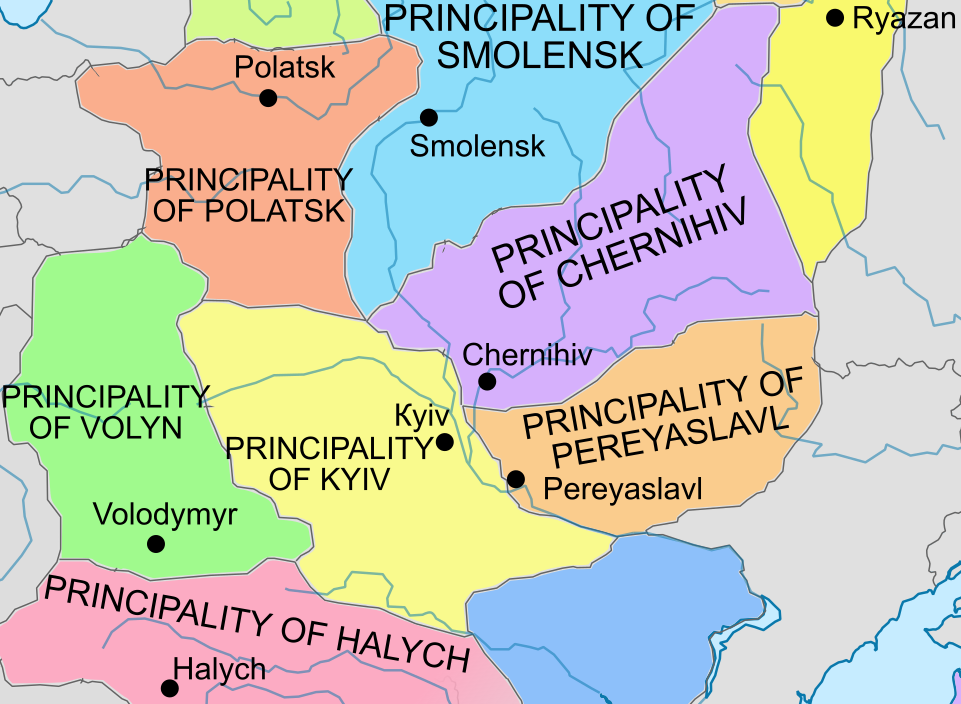
- Principality of Chernigov (1132)
- Status: Principality within Kievan Rus' (1024–1240); Vassal of the Golden Horde (1245–1362); Principality within the Grand Duchy of Lithuania (1362–1402)
- Capital: Chernigov
- Common languages: Old East Slavic (official)
- Religion: Eastern Orthodoxy (official)
- Government: Monarchy; Olgovichi dynasty
- Prince
  - 1024–1036: Mstislav (first)
- History
  - Established: 1024
  - Disestablished: 1402
- Currency: Grivna
Preceded by	Succeeded by
Kievan Rus'	Grand Duchy of Lithuania
- Today part of: Russia; Ukraine; Belarus

The Principality of Chernigov or Chernihiv (Note: Russian: Черниговское княжество; Ukrainian: Чернігівське князівство) was one of the largest and most powerful states within Kievan Rus'. For a time the principality was the second most powerful after the Principality of Kiev. The principality was formed in the 10th century and maintained some of its distinctiveness until the 16th century. The Principality of Chernigov consisted of regions of modern-day Ukraine, Belarus, and Russia.

== Location ==
Most of the Principality of Chernigov was located on the left bank of the river Dnieper, within the basins of the Desna and Seim rivers. The principality was supposedly populated by mostly Slavic tribes of Siverians and partially by the Dnieper Polans. Later the territory of the principality extended to the lands of the Radimichs and partially the Vyatichs and Drehovichs. The capital of the principality was the city of Chernigov. Other main important cities included Novgorod-Seversky, Starodub-Seversky, Trubchevsk and Kozelsk. The areas owned and influenced by the Chernigov Principality bordered the Murom-Ryazan Land to the north and the Tmutorokan Principality to the southeast.

== History ==
Seal of Oleg, Prince of Chernihiv. (1094)

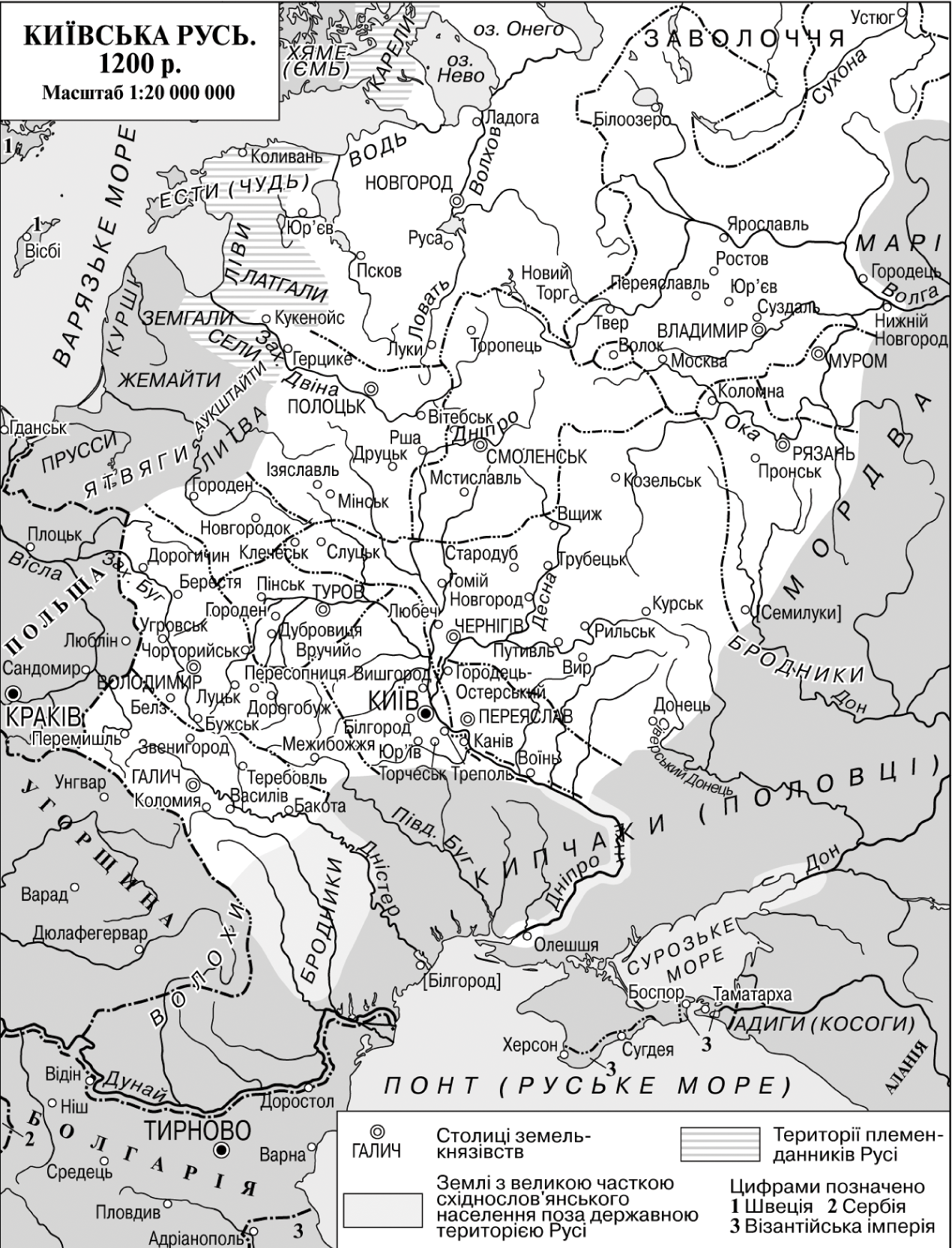
Kievan Rus' (1200)

According to the Primary Chronicle, before the 11th century the principality was ruled by local tribal elders and voivodes from Kiev who were appointed by the Grand Prince to collect tribute from the local population, manage judicial trials, and defend the land from external enemies.

In 1024, Mstislav of Chernigov, son of Vladimir the Great arrived from Tmutarakan and established rule over the principality of Chernigov. Mstislav set the Dnieper river as the boundary between his sphere of influence and that of his brother, Yaroslav the Wise. This would be the first recorded attempt to settle areas of authority by agreement rather than by violence in the lands of the Rus'. The division of land between the brothers progressed in a stable position, this was easily facilitated by the vast distances of the region, where Mstislav expanded south while Yaroslav ventured north.

He began establishing Chernigov as one of the most important administrative centres in the region, whereupon he constructed defensive barriers and expanded the citadel. Fortified ramparts were built with a circumference of 2.5 km with an average height of 4 meters, vast even by the standards of the Rus. Upon the death of Mstislav after a hunting trip in 1036, Chernigov was incorporated into the realm of Kiev.

With the death of his brother, Yaroslav the Wise attained sole authority of the dynasty and claimed the principality of Chernigov, he would rule until 1054. Subsequently, his son who would eventually be titled Grand Prince Sviatoslav initiated the Chernigov branch of the Rurikids. During the civil war of the Yaroslavichi, Chernigov was contested between the sons of Sviatoslav and Vsevolod. After the death of Sviatoslav in 1076, it was decided at the Council of Liubech that the sons of Sviatoslav, Oleg and Davyd, and their descendants would secure the principality. The principality subsequently obtained a certain degree of autonomy and was primarily secured thereafter.

The principality was later split into three main apanage principalities: Chernigov proper, Novgorod-Seversk, and Murom-Ryazan. Tmutarakan, due to its remoteness, often became contested and eventually was overtaken. Murom and later the Ryazan principality drifted away from the influence of Chernigov and after some time was contested by the Principality of Vladimir. Nonetheless, the influence of the Chernigov princes remained large and they retained the title of Grand Prince of Kiev for some time. Chernigov was one of the largest economic and cultural centres of Kievan Rus'.

== List of counties and cities ==
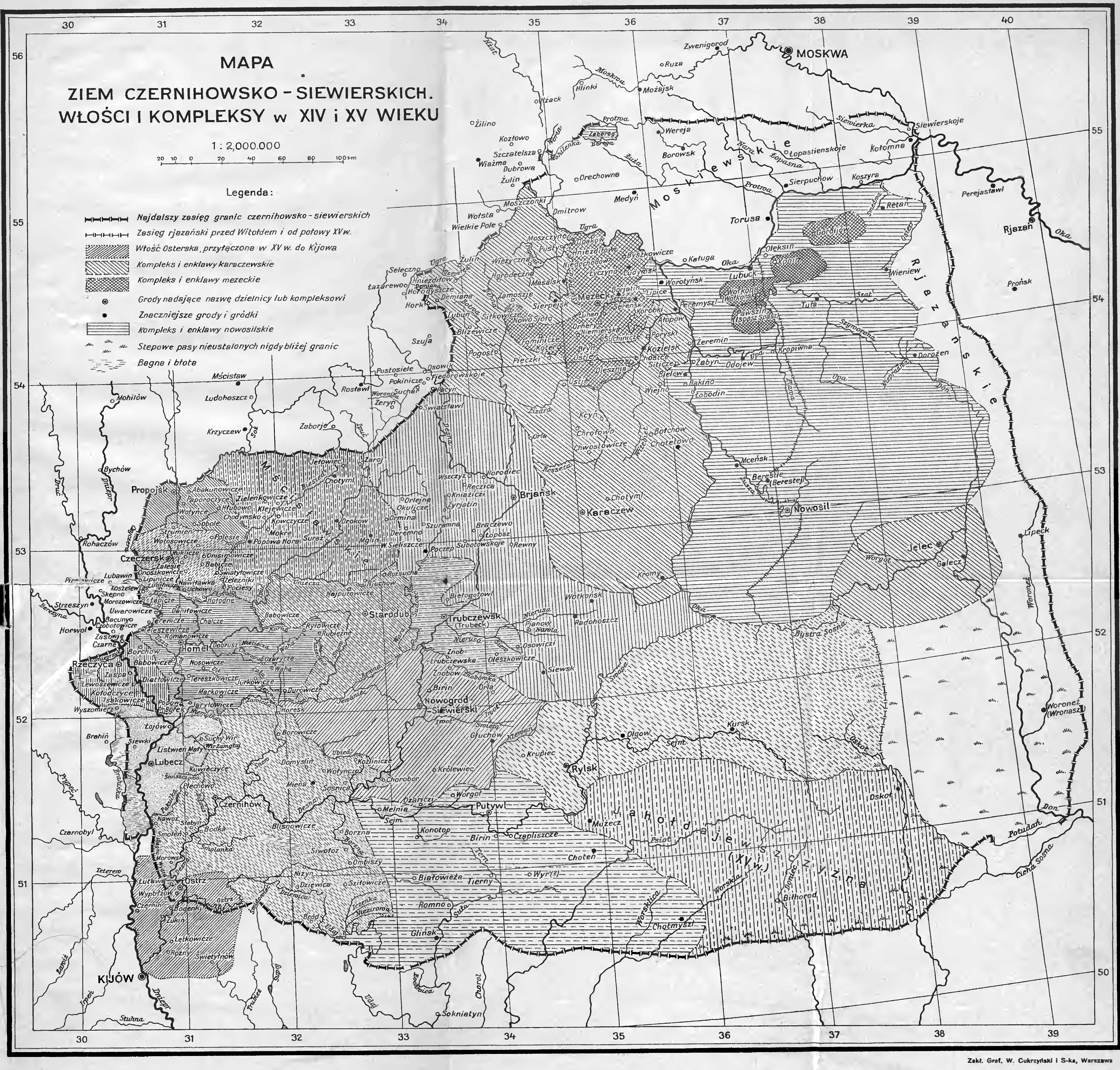
Territories of Chernigov in the 15th century

Below is a list of former counties and cities of the Principality of Chernigov:

- Bilhorod Kyivskyi
- Briansk
- Chachersk
- Chernihiv
- Hlukhiv
- Homel
- Karachev
- Kozelsk
- Kursk
- Liubech
- Mezetsk
- Mglin
- Novhorod-Siversky
- Novosil
- Oryol
- Oster
- Ryazan
- Propoisk
- Putyvl
- Rechytsia
- Rylsk
- Starodub
- Trubetsk
- Vyr
- Yelets

== See also ==
- Upper Oka Principalities, counties along the Oka River
- Severia, historical region

== Bibliography ==
- Ohloblyn, Oleksander (1984). "Chernihiv principality". Encyclopedia of Ukraine. Volume 1. Canadian Institute of Ukrainian Studies.
- Dimnik, Martin (1994). The Dynasty of Chernigov, 1054–1146. Pontifical Institute of Mediaeval Studies. p. 509. ISBN 978-0-88844-116-4.
- Martin, Janet (2007). Medieval Russia: 980–1584. Second Edition. E-book. Cambridge: Cambridge University Press. ISBN 978-0-511-36800-4.
