= Monomakhovichi =

Eastern European family

House of Monomakh
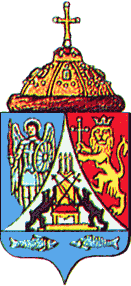
- 19th century coat of arms
- Parent house: Rurikids
- Country: Rus'
- Founded: 1113
- Founder: Vladimir II Monomakh
- Current head: Prince Dmitry Mikhailovich Shakhovskoy (born 1934)
- Titles: King of Rus'; Grand Prince of Kiev; Grand Prince of Lithuania; Tsar of Russia
- Deposition: Russia: 1598 (no heir to the throne)

The House of Monomakh or Monomakhovichi were a major princely branch of the Rurikid dynasty and a cadet branch of Yaroslavichi. Descendants of the branch managed to inherit many princely titles which originated in Kievan Rus'.

== History ==
The progenitor of the house is Vladimir II Monomakh (son of Vsevolod). The name is derived from the grandfather of Vladimir, Byzantine emperor Constantine IX Monomachos of the Monomachos family.

Due to its dominance and conflicts within itself, the branch was subdivided into three major factions: the sons of Mstislav I of Kiev, Izyaslavichi and Rostislavichi; and the sons of Yuri Dolgorukiy, Yurievichi. The split occurred in the 12th century. By that time, Kievan Rus' has already lost its control over the Principality of Polotsk (Iziaslavichi, later Vseslavichi) and the Principality of Halych (Rostislavichi), which were self-governed by other branches of the Rurikid dynasty. The Monomakhovichi were in conflict with these branches.

== Main branches ==
=== Senior branch ===
- Mstislavichi – Mstislav I of Kiev
  - Iziaslavichi of Volhynia – Iziaslav II of Kiev
    - Romanovichi of Volhynia – Roman the Great
  - Rostislavichi of Smolensk – Rostislav I of Kiev
    - Shakhovskoy – Konstantin Glebovich Shah

=== Junior branches ===
- Yurievichi of Vladimir-Suzdal – Yuri Dolgorukiy
  - Yaroslavichi of Tver – Yaroslav of Tver
  - Daniilovichi of Moscow – Daniil of Moscow
  - Konstantinovichi of Nizhny Novgorod-Suzdal – Konstantin of Suzdal
- Lobanov-Rostovsky (Nikita Lobanov-Rostovsky)
- Gagarin of Starodub (Andrey Gagarin)

=== Yurievichi branch ===
The Yurievichi branch (named after Yuri Dolgorukiy) would reign in Muscovy and the Tsardom of Russia until the 1598 death of Feodor I caused the Time of Troubles. The lineage from Yuri Dolgorukiy onwards is given in the table below:

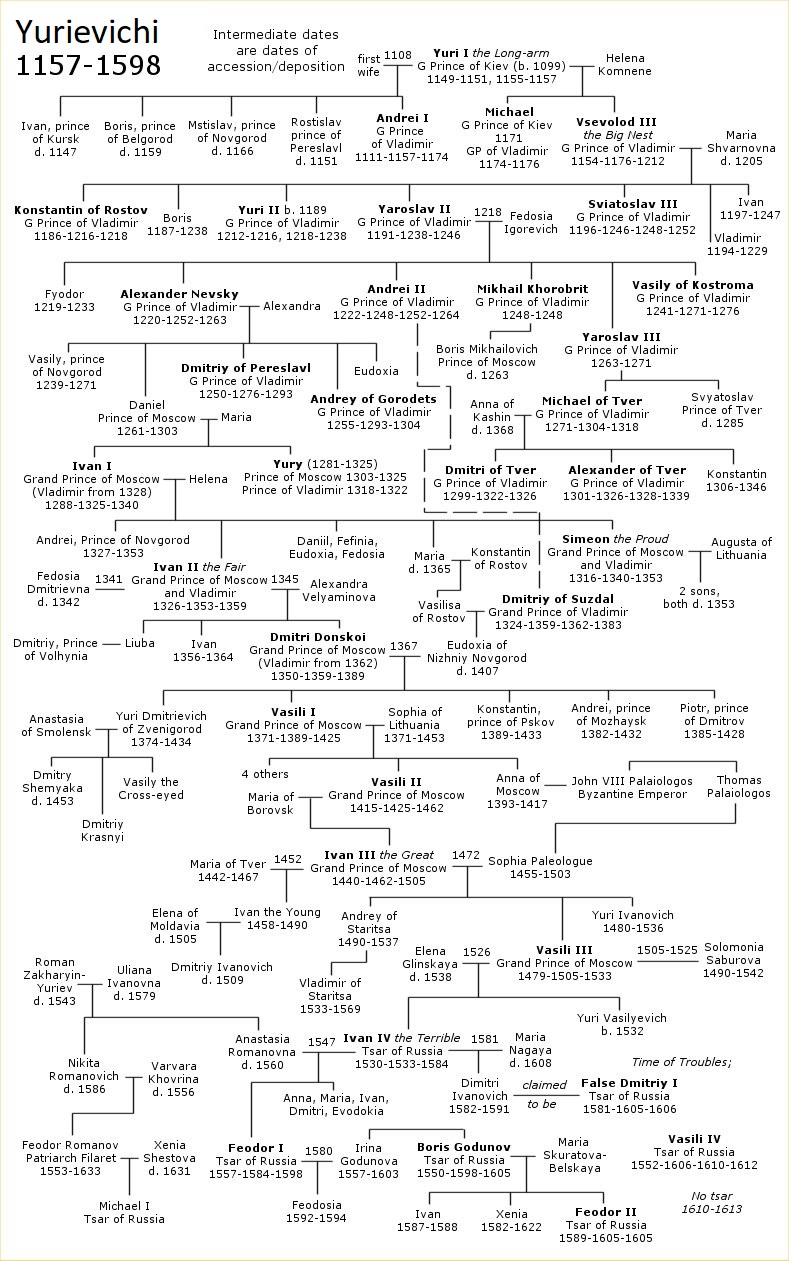

== Bibliography ==
- Halperin, Charles J. (1987). Russia and the Golden Horde: The Mongol Impact on Medieval Russian History. p. 222. ISBN 9781850430575. (e-book).
- Martin, Janet (2007). Medieval Russia: 980–1584. Second Edition. E-book. Cambridge: Cambridge University Press. ISBN 978-0-511-36800-4.
