= Derugin family =

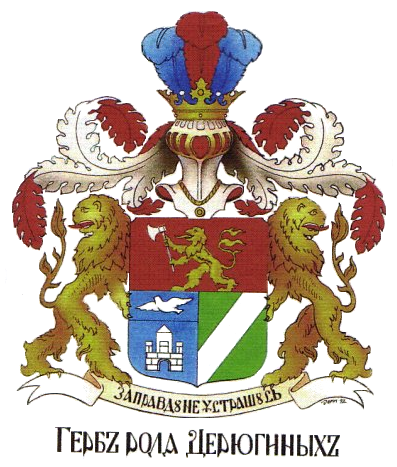
Arms of the Derugin family

The Derugin family (Russian: Дерюгины, German: von Derjugin, Deryugin) is a Russian noble family descended from boyar scions.

One branch of the family also holds matrilineal descent from the Rurik dynasty through Irina Borisovna née princess Shakhovskaya, wife of George Georgievich von Derjugin (1915–1987).

In the 19th century, and especially after the abolition of serfdom, the "Derugin" surname began to appear among peasants who adopted their employers' name but were not themselves descendants of the noble family.

== Family history ==
One of the earliest mentions of the Derugin family is found in the Historical Chronicles of Kursk Nobility, which refers to members of the family as nobles (dvoriane) and boyar scions (deti boyarskie) residing and performing military service in the Rylsk region in the 16th century. The manuscripts indicate that members of the Derugin family fought in the Smolensk War of 1632.

In the 19th century, the Derugin family invested in industry and founded numerous businesses, including a textile factory, sawmill, and a massive steam-powered mill that continues to operate to this day in Rylsk.

Meanwhile, a branch of the family relocated to the Pskov region, where the Derugins became known for their social and political leadership. Members of the family served in local government, as well as the Senate and the State Duma of the Russian Empire. Among the family's extensive land holdings, the most famous was the family estate Kolosovka, which, according to descendants of the family, was visited by notable persons such as Russian poet Alexander Pushkin, who was acquainted with Dmitri Andreevich Derugin and spent time in the Pskov region.

During the Russian Revolution in 1917, Georgy Mikhailovich Derugin was involved in an underground organization that attempted to save the family of Tsar Nicholas II and smuggle them out of the country. After the failure, he proceeded to take on leadership roles in various anti-bolshevik initiatives of the White movement. His brother Anatoly Mikhailovich Derugin served as an officer in the White Army. Eventually the family was forced to flee the country. Most members of the Derugin family settled in Europe and the United States. Of those who remained in Russia, most were stripped of their property and exiled from their homes, and forced to hide their ancestry among peasants of the same surname.

== Notable family members ==
- Dmitri Andreevich Derugin (1797–1866), founded the Pskov branch of the Derugin family, served as chairman of the Civil Court in Pskov, acquired numerous estates in the Pskov region.
- Michail Dmitrievich Derugin (1839–1912), served as the warden of the Pskov city school, member of the Pskov City Duma, and District Commander of the 4th district of the Pskov region.
- Georgy Mikhailovich Derugin (1871–1933), member of the State Duma of the Russian Empire, leader and activist in the White Movement.
- Konstantin Mikhailovich Derjugin (1878–1938), prominent Russian zoologist, marine biologist, and oceanologist.
- Vladimir Michailovich Derugin (1875–1945), kammerjunker (lord of the chamber) in the Imperial Court of Nicholas II, collegiate councillor, senior secretary of the 1st Department of the Governing Senate.
- George Georgievich von Derugin (1915–1987), professor of economics at the University of Berlin, University of Southern California, and University of California, San Francisco, specializing in internal trade and monetary policy of the USSR.
- Vladimir Georgievich von Derugin (1918–1945),
- Tatiana Georgievna Varshavskaya née von Derugin (1923–2019), personal translator to Russian writer and dissident Aleksandr Solzhenitsyn, worked at the United Nations, wife of known Russian publicist Vladimir Varshavsky.
- Vladimir Georgievich von Derugin (1949), participated in various projects and negotiations for the preservation of Fort Ross State Historic Park, priest of the Russian Orthodox Church and community leader in the Silicon Valley.
- Nikita Georgievich von Derugin (1953–2014), researcher at the University of California, San Francisco and at Stanford University, specializing in microvascular surgery and traumatic brain injury modeling, with over 100 medical publications.

== Estates and toponyms ==
List of former Derugin family holdings and current toponyms:

- Kolosovka – village and former family estate in Pechorsky District of Pskov Oblast
- Khryapyevo – village in Bezhanitsky District of Pskov Oblast
- Korushkino – village in Pskov Oblast
- Velye – village in Pechorsky District of Pskov Oblast
- Zekhnovo – village in Pechorsky District of Pskov Oblast
- Kosygino – village in Pechorsky District of Pskov Oblast
- Petrovskaya – village in Pskov Oblast
- Aksenovo – village in Ostrovsky District of Pskov Oblast
- Gurushka – village in Ostrovsky District of Pskov Oblast
- Zagorye – village in Ostrovsky District of Pskov Oblast
- Kostalenka – village in Ostrovsky District of Pskov Oblast
- Krasnovo – village in Ostrovsky District of Pskov Oblast
- Lavrovo – village in Ostrovsky District of Pskov Oblast
- Samsonovka – village in Ostrovsky District of Pskov Oblast
- Skuratovo – village in Ostrovsky District of Pskov Oblast
- Khoronevo – village in Ostrovsky District of Pskov Oblast
- Shevelevo – village in Ostrovsky District of Pskov Oblast
- Sterzhen (currently Mokrousovo) – village in Khomutovsky District of Kursk Oblast
- Derugino – village in Komarichsky District of Bryansk Oblast
- Derugino – railroad station in Dmitriyevsky District of Kursk Oblast
- Derugino – village in Dmitriyevsky District of Kursk Oblast
- Derugino – village in Korenevsky District of Kursk Oblast
- Derugino – village in Soskovsky District of Oryol Oblast
- Deryugina Basin (Kotlovina Deryugina) – an undersea feature of the Sea of Okhotsk, named after Konstantin Mikhailovich Derjugin
- Deryugina Bay (Bukhta Deryugina) – in Laptev Sea, named after Konstantin Mikhailovich Derjugin
- Deryugina Bay (Zaliv Deryugina) – in Zemlya Georga in Barents Sea, named after Konstantin Mikhailovich Derjugin
- Mount Deryugin (Gora Deryugina) – in Antarctica, named after Konstantin Mikhailovich Derjugin
- Deryugina Lake (Ozero Deryugina) – in Novaya Zemlya by Rusanov Bay, named after Konstantin Mikhailovich Derjugin

== Eponyms ==
Derjugin's lizard (Darevskia derjugini) – named in honor of Konstantin Mikhailovich Derjugin
