= Nikolai Gagarin =

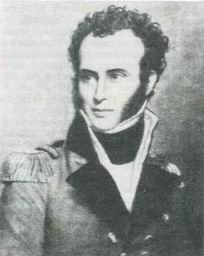
Prince Nikolai Sergeevich Gagarin (1784-1842).

Prince (Knyaz) Nikolai Sergeevich Gagarin (князь Николай Сергеевич Гагарин; 1784–1842) was a Russian military leader and government official.

== Life ==
Born in London to the Rurikid Gagarin family, Prince Gagarin was appointed to the Highest command of the 1st infantry during a drawing up of the Moscow military force (July 1812). He took part in the Battle of Borodino, the largest and bloodiest single-day battle of the Napoleonic Wars, involving more than a quarter of a million soldiers. Prince Gagarin also owned several businesses throughout Russia and Europe. In 1819, Prince Gagarin married Maria Alexeeva Bobrinsky (Bobrinkaya), granddaughter of Catherine II of Russia and Prince Gregory Orlov.

On October 16, 1833, Gagarin was appointed a post of vice-president of the His Majesty's Cabinet under Emperor Nicholas I and Chairman Viktor Kochubey; in December 1837, he was appointed member of the commission for the restoration of the Winter Palace after a fire. During service as vice-president, he was the recipient of several distinctions: the Order of Saint Stanislaus 1st class (1834), the Order of St. Anna 1st class (1835), the Order of St. Vladimir 2nd class (1839) and the Order of the White Eagle (1841).

Prince Gagarin died a violent death by the hand of one of his former subordinates, a forest warden of the Rejnmana estate. Prince Gagarin met the forest warden at Rejnmana, and, after a brief conversation, was fatally shot in the neck. Despite medical aid, the prince died in minutes. Rejnman explained that he killed Gagarin because he had been exposed to oppression and had lost his rank. However, according to his contemporaries' testimonies, Gagarin had been a humane employer.

Nikolai Sergeevich Gagarin's descendants were forced into exile during the Russian Revolution and lived in France until recently. Parts of the Gagarin family now live in the United States.
