= Rurikids =

Noble lineage and rulers of Kievan Rus'

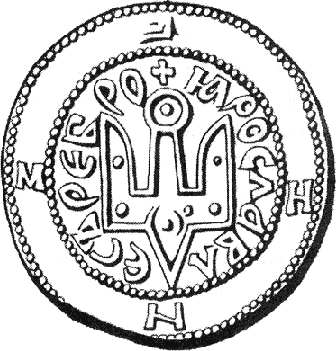
- Personal seal of Yaroslav the Wise
- Country: Kievan Rus'; Kingdom of Galicia–Volhynia; Principality of Kiev; Grand Duchy of Vladimir; Grand Duchy of Lithuania; Grand Duchy of Moscow; Tsardom of Russia
- Founded: 862 (in Novgorod)
- Founder: Rurik
- Final ruler: Feodor I of Russia; Vasili IV of Russia (junior branch)
- Titles: Tsar of all Russia; Sovereign of all Russia; King of Ruthenia; Grand Prince of Moscow; Grand Prince of Kiev; Grand Prince of Vladimir; Ban of Slavonia; Ban of Macsó; Princely titles: Prince of Tver; Prince of Chernigov and Ryazan; Prince of Smolensk; Prince of Turov; Prince of Pereyaslavl; Prince of Polotsk; Prince of Rostov
- Styles: "Highness"; "Majesty"; "Grace"
- Estates: Moscow Kremlin (1263–1564, 1581–1598); Alexandrov Kremlin (1564–1581)
- Deposition: 1610 (in Moscow, Tsardom of Russia)
- Cadet branches: Belosselsky-Belozersky of Beloozero; Dolgorukov of Obolensk; Drutskoy of Drutsk; Putyatin of Drutsk; Gagarin of Starodub; Gorchakov of Peremyshl; Kropotkin of Smolensk; Lobanov-Rostovsky of Rostov; Lvov of Yaroslavl; Massalski of Mosalsk and Karachev; Obolensky of Obolensk; Repnin of Obolensk; Shcherbatov of Obolensk; Odoyevsky of Odoyev and Novosil; Ostrogski of Ostroh; Prozorovsky of Mologa; Romodanovsky of Starodub; Rzhesvsky of Smolensk and Rzhev; Shakhovskoy of Yaroslavl; Shuysky of Shuya; Volkonsky of Tarusa; Vorotynsky of Vorotynsk; Vyazemsky of Vyazma; Yeletsky of Yelets

The Rurik dynasty, (Note: Belarusian: Рурыкавічы, romanized: Rurykavichy; Russian: Рюриковичи, romanized: Ryurikovichi, Ukrainian: Рюриковичі, romanized: Riurykovychi, lit. 'sons/scions of Rurik'.) also known as the Rurikids (or Riurikids), was the ruling dynasty of Kievan Rus' and its successor principalities. According to tradition, it was founded by the Varangian prince Rurik, who established himself at Novgorod in 862. Following the disintegration of Kievan Rus', the house split into independent principalities ruled by different branches of the dynasty.

The Romanovichi ruled the southwestern territories, which were unified by Roman the Great and his son Daniel, who was in 1253 crowned by Pope Innocent IV as the king of Ruthenia. Galicia–Volhynia was eventually annexed by Poland and Lithuania. The northern and northeastern territories were unified by the Daniilovichi of Moscow; by the 15th century, Ivan III threw off the control of the Golden Horde and assumed the title of sovereign of all Russia. Ivan IV was crowned as the tsar of all Russia, where the Rurik line ruled until 1598, following which they were eventually succeeded by the House of Romanov.

As a ruling house, the Rurikids held their own for a total of 21 generations in male-line succession, from Rurik (d. 879) to Feodor I of Russia (d. 1598), a period of more than 700 years. Numerous princely families have claimed to trace their lineage to Rurik. They are one of Europe's oldest royal houses, with numerous existing cadet branches.

== Origins ==
=== Genealogical issues ===
The origins of the Rurikids are unclear, as its namesake Rurik, a Varangian prince who allegedly founded the dynasty in 862 through the "Calling of the Varangians", is considered to be a legendary, mythical and perhaps even entirely fictional character by modern scholars. (Note: Christian Raffensperger (2012, 2017), Ostrowski (2018), Halperin (2022).) Nicholas V. Riasanovsky (1947) stated: '...no Kievan sources anterior to the Primary Chronicle (early twelfth century), knew of Riurik. In tracing the ancestry of Kievan princes they usually stopped with Igor.' As an example, Hilarion of Kiev's Sermon on Law and Grace (1050s), praising Volodimer I of Kiev, only goes back to his father Sviatoslav I and grandfather Igor of Kiev. Even if Rurik did exist, scholars have long doubted or rejected his paternity of Igor. (Note: Including Hrushevsky (1904), Vernadsky (1943), Riasanovsky (1947), Paszkiewicz (1954), Franklin and Shepard (1996).) The connections between Rurik, Oleg and Igor, as attested in the Primary Chronicle and Novgorod First Chronicle, are tenuous at best; in all other cases, these two chronicles base any particular ruler's legitimacy on the fact that their father or grandfather previously "sat on the throne in Kiev", and never refer back to Rurik. Legitimacy in the Kievan Chronicle is also heavily based on a ruler being descended from his father and grandfather, with the exception of two 5-generation lists. (Note: 'Of the eighteen cases of a new ruler ascending to the throne, the [Kievan Chronicle] describes their sitting on the throne of their "grandfather and father" 15 times, 18 of their "grandfathers and fathers" twice, and of his "father and grandfathers" once.' The two 5-generation lists in the Kievan Chronicle includes the 12th-century Rurik Rostislavich, but no mention of the supposed dynasty founder Rurik, which Ostrowski (2018) found remarkable: '[The Kievan Chronicle] makes no reference, allusion, or mention in any way to the Riurik who supposedly founded the dynasty, even more telling because of the ruler who he is extolling has the same name. When a connection with Riurik could be made with the addition of just one more generational antecedent, we find no attempt to do so before the mid fifteenth century.') Before the mid-15th century, no historical source claims that Rurik founded a dynasty; the Hypatian Codex of c. 1425 began its list of knyazi of Kiev with "Dir and Askold", then "Oleg", then "Igor", up to 1240, and does not mention Rurik anywhere. It was not until the 16th century that Rus' churchmen developed an explicit tradition, described in the 1560 Book of Royal Degrees by Macarius, Metropolitan of Moscow, according to which the reigning Danilovichi house of the Grand Duchy of Moscow (Muscovy) was part of a "Rurikid dynasty", which not only traced back all the way to the legendary Rurik, but was purportedly descended from a certain Prus, a supposed kinsman of Augustus Caesar. According Ostrowski (2018), the Rus' churchmen developed this concept of a R(i)urikid dynasty for the purpose of "bolstering the Muscovite dynastic state". Although many later historians would accept the 16th-century Rus' churchmen's dynastic claim that the Danilovichi were descended from Rurik, they did not accept Prus as the ancestor of the Muscovite princes. Because of these issues, various scholars have instead named the dynasty the Volodimerovichi, descendants of grand prince Volodimer I of Kiev.

=== Ethnographic issues ===
The scholarly consensus is that the Rus' people originated in coastal eastern Sweden around the eighth century and that their name is connected with Roslagen, or Roden, as it was known in earlier times. According to the prevalent theory, the name Rus', like the Proto-Finnic name for Sweden (*Ruotsi), is derived from an Old Norse term for "the men who row" (rods-) as rowing was the main method of navigating the rivers of Eastern Europe. The same root also underlies the Finnish and Estonian names for Sweden: Ruotsi and Rootsi.

The Primary Chronicle gives the following account the "Calling of the Varangians", dating it to the Byzantine years of the world 6368–6370 (AD 860–862):

The tributaries of the Varangians drove them back beyond the sea and, refusing them further tribute, set out to govern themselves. There was no law among them, but tribe rose against tribe. Discord thus ensued among them, and they began to war one against another. They said to themselves, "Let us seek a prince who may rule over us and judge us according to the Law." They accordingly went overseas to the Varangian Russes: these particular Varangians were known as Russes, just as some are called Swedes, and others Normans, English, and Gotlanders, for they were thus named. The Chuds, the Slavs, the Krivichians, and the Ves' then said to the people of Rus', "Our land is great and rich, but there is no order in it. Come to rule and reign over us." They thus selected three brothers, with their kinsfolk, who took with them all the Russes and migrated. The oldest, Rurik, located himself in Novgorod; the second, Sineus, at Beloozero; and the third, Truvor, in Izborsk. On account of these Varangians, the district of Novgorod became known as the land of Rus'. The present inhabitants of Novgorod are descended from the Varangian race, but aforetime they were Slavs [преже бо бѣша Словѣни].

There is some ambiguity even in the Primary Chronicle about the specifics of the story, "hence their paradoxical statement 'the people of Novgorod are of Varangian stock, for formerly they were Slovenes.'" However, archaeological evidence such as "Frankish swords, a sword chape and a tortoiseshell brooch" in the area suggest that there was, in fact, a Scandinavian population during the tenth century at the latest.

=== Genetic studies ===
A genetic study on the origins of the Rurikids (Zhur et al. 2023) analysed "for the first time", remains belonging to Prince Dmitry Alexandrovich. The study found that Dmitry Alexandrovich and most of the "medieval and modern Rurikids", starting with Prince Yaroslav the Wise, belong to paternal haplogroup N-M231 (N1a). The genetic results suggest that the formation of the Rurikid lineage included a population from eastern Scandinavia (Öland), a population from Central Europe or the Iron Age Eurasian Steppe, and an East Asian component via Siberian geneflow to Northeastern Europe.

== History ==
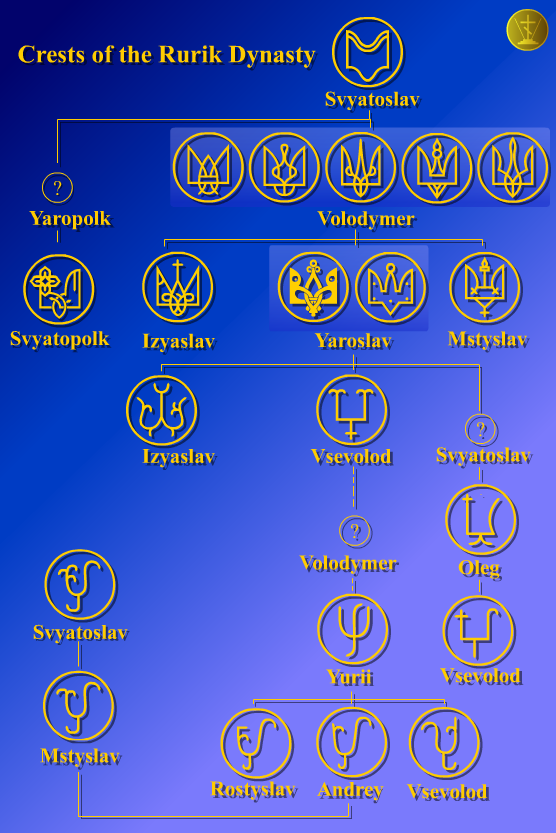
Personal seals of Rurikids. The trident (tryzub) is considered as symbol of Rus and was adopted by independent Ukraine in the 20th century as a Ukrainian coat of arms.

Rurik and his brothers founded a state that later historians called Kievan Rus′. By the middle of the twelfth century, Kievan Rus′ had dissolved into independent principalities, each ruled by a different branch of the Rurikid house. The dynasty followed agnatic seniority and the izgoi principle. The house underwent a major schism after the death of Yaroslav the Wise in 1054, dividing into three branches on the basis of descent from three successive ruling Grand Princes: Iziaslav (1024–1078), Sviatoslav (1027–1076), and Vsevolod (1030–1093). In addition, a line of Polotsk princes assimilated themselves with the princes of Lithuania. In the 10th century the Council of Liubech made some amendments to a succession rule and divided Ruthenia into several autonomous principalities that had equal rights to obtain the Kievan throne.

Vsevolod's line eventually became better known as the Monomakhovichi and was the predominant one. The line of Sviatoslav later became known as Olegovychi and often laid claim to the lands of Chernihiv and Severia. The Izyaslavychi who ruled Turov and Volhynia were eventually replaced by a Monomakhovychi branch.

According to Jaroslaw Pelenski,

The 'Riurikide' dynasty and the ruling elite ... attempted to impose on their highly diverse polity the integrative concept of russkaia zemlia ('the Rus' land') and the unifying notion of a 'Rus' people'. ... But 'Kievan Rus'' was never really a unified polity. It was a loosely bound, ill-defined, and heterogeneous conglomeration of lands and cities inhabited by tribes and population groups whose loyalties were primarily territorial.

This caused the Rurikid house to effectively dissolve into several sub-dynasties ruling smaller states in the 10th and 11th centuries. These were the Olgoviches of Severia who ruled in Chernigov, Yuryeviches who controlled Vladimir-Suzdal, and Romanoviches in Galicia-Volhynia.

=== Descendants of Sviatoslav II of Kiev ===
The Olgovichi descended from Oleg I of Chernigov, a son of Sviatoslav II of Kiev and grandson of Yaroslav the Wise. They continued to rule until the early 14th century when they were torn apart by the emerging Grand Duchy of Lithuania and Grand Duchy of Moscow. The line continued through Oleg's son Vsevolod II of Kiev, grandson Sviatoslav III of Kiev, great-grandson Vsevolod IV of Kiev and great-great-grandson Michael of Chernigov, from whose sons the extant lines of the Olegoviches are descended, including the Massalsky, Gorchakov, Skarzhinsky, Baryatinsky, Volkonsky and Obolensky, including Repnin.

=== Descendants of Vsevolod I of Kiev ===
Vsevolod I of Kiev was the father of Vladimir II Monomakh, giving rise to the name Monomakh for his progeny. Two of Vladimir II's sons were Mstislav I of Kiev and Yuri Dolgorukiy.

The Romanovichi (Izyaslavichi of Volhynia) were the line of Roman the Great, descended from Mstislav I of Kiev through his son Iziaslav II of Kiev and his grandson Mstislav II of Kiev, father of Roman the Great. The older Monomakhovychi line that ruled the Principality of Volhynia were eventually crowned kings of Galicia and Volhynia and ruled until 1323. The Romanovychi displaced the older line of Izyaslavychi from Turov and Volhynia as well as Rostyslavychi from Galicia. The last were two brothers of Romanovychi, Andrew and Lev II, who ruled jointly and were slain trying to repel Mongol incursions. The Polish king, Władysław I the Elbow-high, in his letter to the Pope wrote with regret: "The two last Ruthenian kings, that had been firm shields for Poland from the Tatars, left this world and after their death Poland is directly under Tatar threat." Losing their leadership role, the Rurikids, however, continued to play a vital role in the Grand Duchy of Lithuania and the later Polish–Lithuanian Commonwealth. Most notably, the Ostrogski family held the title of Grand Hetman of Lithuania and strove to preserve the Ruthenian language and Eastern Orthodoxy in this part of Europe. It is thought that the Drutsk and related princely families may also descend from Roman the Great.

The Rostislavichi were the line of Rostislav I of Kiev, another son of Mstislav I of Kiev, who was Prince of Smolensk and a progenitor of the lines descending from the princes of Smolensk and Yaroslavl.

The Shakhovskoys were founded by Konstantin "Shakh" Glebovich, Prince of Yaroslavl, and traces its lineage to Rostislav I of Kiev through his son Davyd Rostislavich. This branch also descends cognatically of Ivan I of Moscow, through the latter's daughter Evdokia Ivanovna Moskovskaya (1314–1342), who married Vasili Mikhailovich, Prince of Yaroslavl (died 1345). They were the great-grandparents of Andrey and Yuriy, the first Shakhovskoy princes. This is possibly the most senior extant branch of the Rurikids, with many Shakhovskoys living outside of Russia after having fled during the Russian Revolution.

The Yurievichi were founded by Yuriy Dolgorukiy, the founder of Moscow and spread vastly in the north-east. Yuri's son Vsevolod the Big Nest was Prince of Vladimir-Suzdal, a precursor state to the Grand Principality of Moscow and thus of the Russian Empire. Vsevolod's son Konstantin of Rostov was Prince of Rostov and the progenitor of various Rostov princely lines. Another son, Ivan Vsevolodich, was Prince of Starodub and progenitor of a number of extant lines, most notably the Gagarin line.

Vsevolod's son Yaroslav II of Vladimir was the father of Alexander Nevsky, whose son Daniel of Moscow sired the ruling house of Moscow until the end of the 16th century; the princes of Moscow are often referred to as the Daniilovichi.

Beginning with the reign of Ivan the Terrible, the Muscovite branch used the title "Tsar of All Russia" and ruled over the Tsardom of Russia. The death in 1598 of Tsar Feodor I ended the rule of the Rurik dynasty. The dynasty was briefly revived in the person of Vasili IV of Russia, a descendant of Shuyskiy line of the Rurik dynasty, but he died without issue. The unstable period known as the Time of Troubles followed Feodor's death and lasted until 1613.

In that year, Mikhail I ascended the throne, founding the Romanov dynasty that would rule until 1762 and as Holstein-Gottorp-Romanov until the revolutions of 1917. Tsar Mikhail's father Patriarch Filaret of Moscow was descended from the Rurik dynasty through the female line. His mother, Evdokiya Gorbataya-Shuyskaya, was a Rurikid princess from the Shuysky branch, daughter of Alexander Gorbatyi-Shuisky. Tsar Mikhail's first wife Maria Dolgorukova was of Rurikid stock but their marriage produced no children.

== Branches ==
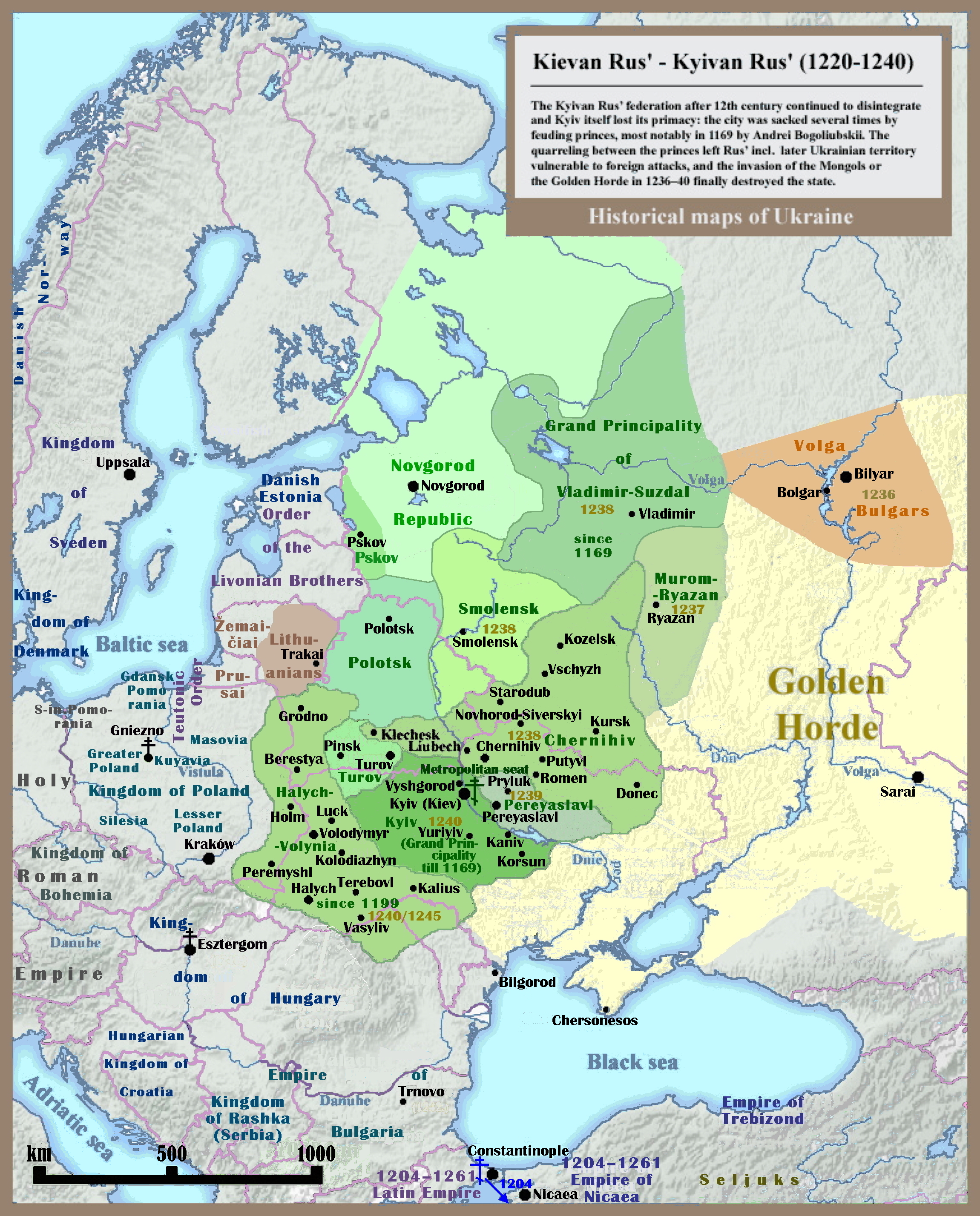
Principalities of Kievan Rus', ruled by Rurikid princes, 1220–1240

Volodimerovichi, grand princes of Kiev

- Izyaslavichi of Polotsk, princes of Polotsk
  - Putyatin, princes Putyatin (extant)
- Izyaslavichi of Turov, princes of Turov and Volhynia
- Monomakhovichi, princes of Pereyaslavl
  - Izyaslavichi of Volhynia, princes of Volhynia, kings of Rus (senior branch)
  - Rostislavichi of Smolensk, princes of Smolensk (middle branch)
    - Kropotkin, princes Kropotkin (extant)
    - Lvov princely family, emerged in the 17th century as descendants of the Rostislavichi princes of Yaroslavl (before 1260 Yaroslavl was in Yurievichi hands)
    - Rzhesvsky, non-titled (extant)
    - Prozorovsky (extinct since 1914)
  - Yurievichi, princes of Vladimir-Suzdal; until 1260 princes of Yaroslavl
    - Daniilovichi, princes of Moscow. This branch would reign in Muscovy and the Tsardom of Russia until it went extinct with the 1598 death of Feodor I, which caused the Time of Troubles.
    - Konstantinovichi, princes of Galich, Russia (1247–1362). Progenitor: Konstantin Yaroslavich, son of Yaroslav II of Vladimir
      - Lyapunov family, emerged in the 16th century as descendants from the Konstantinovichi princes of Galich, Russia
  - Shakhovskoy, princes of Yaroslavl (senior extant branch)
  - Lobanov-Rostovsky, princes of Rostov (middle extant branch)
  - Gagarin, princes of Starodub-on-the-Klyazma (junior extant branch)
- Sviatoslavichi, princes of Ryazan and Murom
  - Olgovichi, princes of Chernihiv
    - Skarzynski, Belarusian nobles
    - Gorchakov, princes Gorchakov (extant)
    - Massalski family, princes of Mosalsky (Massalsky)
    - Obolensky, princes Obolensky (extant)
      - Dolgorukov, princes Dolgorukov (extant; cadet branch of the Obolensky family)
- Rostislavichi of Halych, princes of Halych
- Vadbosky, a branch of the princes Belozersky (extant)
- Volkonsky, a branch of the princes of Tarusa (extant)

=== Disputed ===
- Possibly the Ogiński family; various "Rurikid" branches have been proposed, as well as Lithuanian ones.
- Possibly the Ostrogski family, a branch of the Romanovichi, but could also be descended from the Lithuanian Gediminids.
- Possibly the Wiśniowiecki family, a branch of the House of Zbaraski (extinct), but could also be descended from the Lithuanian Gediminids.

== Legacy ==
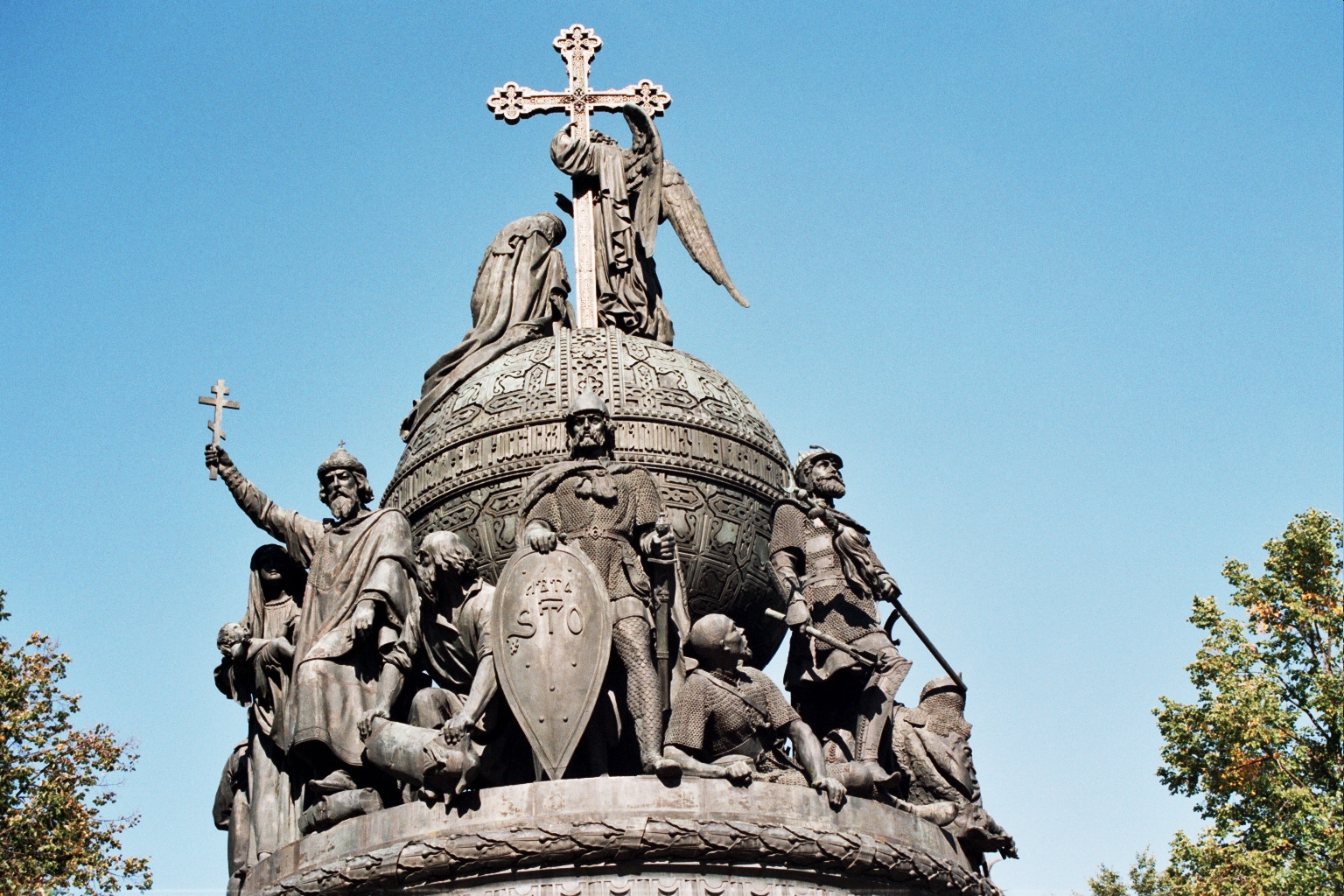
Millennium of Russia monument in Novgorod with Rurik (centre), Vladimir the Great (left), Dmitry Donskoy (right)

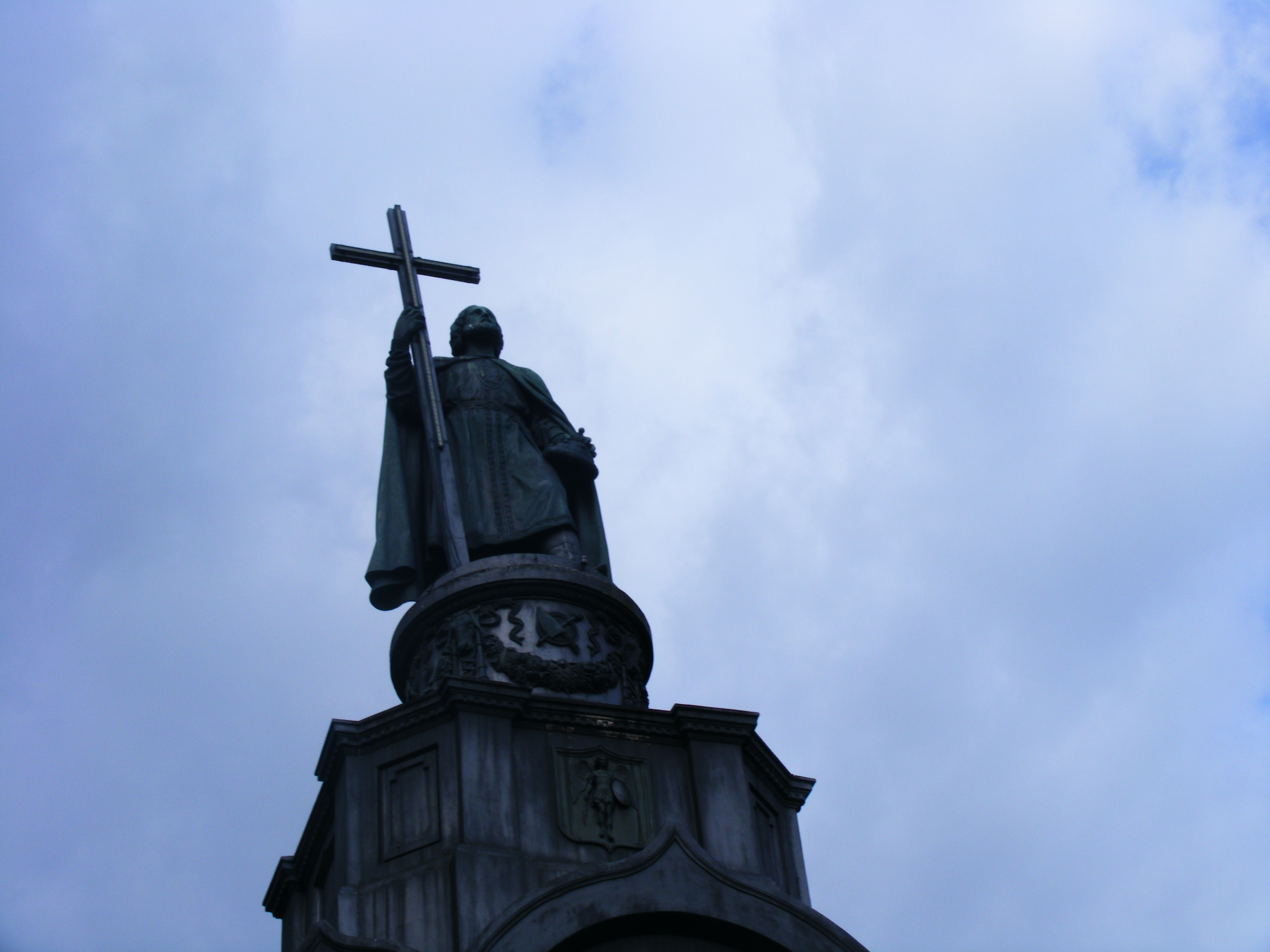
Monument to Prince Volodymyr on Volodymyrska Hill in Kyiv

Russian and Ukrainian historians have debated for many years about the legacy of the Rurikid dynasty. The Russian view sees the Principality of Moscow ruled by the Rurikid dynasty as the sole heir to the Kievan Rus' civilisation. This view is "resting largely on religious-ecclesiastical and historical claims" because the Eastern Russian lands managed to establish themselves as an independent state that was ruled by the Rurikid dynasty until the 16th century. This view started in Moscow as ruled by the original Rurikid dynasty between the 1330s and the late 1560s. At the same time the Ukrainian view of sole succession is based on continuity from the Kievan Rus and its subsequent Kingdom of Ruthenia, Lithuania-Ruthenia, and the Cossack Hetmanate. For that it had utilised mainly territorial, ethnodemographic, social, and institutional arguments.

The predominant Ukrainian view had gradually changed over time. After the decline of Kievan Rus, the rulers of Galicia-Volhynia claimed sole succession and the title of ruler of all former Rus lands as was noted in the Kievan and then Galician–Volhynian Chronicles. Following the downfall of Galicia-Volhynia, monarchs of the Grand Duchy of Lithuania and Ruthenia and then the Polish–Lithuanian Commonwealth claimed sole succession as well, which in turn was supported by the Ruthenian population and historians at the time. But that view had shifted by the mid 17th century, especially after Pereiaslav Agreement and publication of Kievan Synopsis in 1674 that viewed people of Great Russia, Little Russia and White Russia as a single All-Russian nation under the leadership of the Tsar. Though latter was challenged, but eventually became predominantly accepted until the History of Ruthenians was written at the break of the 18th and 19th centuries. This became the underlying foundation for a separate Ukrainian historiography with a later monolineal and exclusivist Ukrainian national theory being advanced by national historiography between the 1840s and the end of the 1930s. It was summarised most clearly by Mykhailo Hrushevsky in his History of Ukraine-Rusʹ, laying the foundation for the current sole succession view.

By the 1930s the prior All-Russian nation ideology was modified to "allot equal rights to the Kievan inheritance to the Three Slavic peoples, that is the Russians, the Ukrainians, and the Belorussians", but later elevated the Russian nation as the elder brother to give the others "needed guidance in revolutionary struggles and socialist construction."

There are currently various extant branches of the Rurikids, for instance: the Houses of Shakhovskoy, Gagarin, and Lobanov-Rostovsky. Their representatives include Prince Dmitriy Mikhailovich Shakhovskoy (born 1934); Prince Dmitri Andreevich Gagarin (born 1934); and Prince Nikita Lobanov-Rostovsky (born 1935), a descendant of Prince Konstantin Vasilyevich of Rostov. The three of them are of the Monomakhovichi branch. While the Shakhovskoys claim descent from Mstislav I of Kiev, the Gagarins and the Lobanov-Rostovskys are descendants of Vsevolod III of Vladimir, which makes the Shakhovskoys the most senior.

== Gallery ==
Arms of the House of Holstein-Gottorp-Romanov

Coat of arms of the Dolgoruky family

Coat of arms of the Belosselsky-Belozersky family

Coat of arms of the Kropotkin family

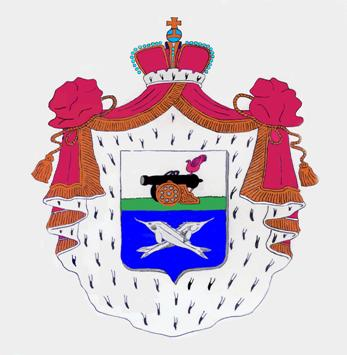
Coat of arms of the families of Monastyrev stock is composed of Smolensk and Belozersk emblems.

Gagarin family / Khilkoff Coat of arms

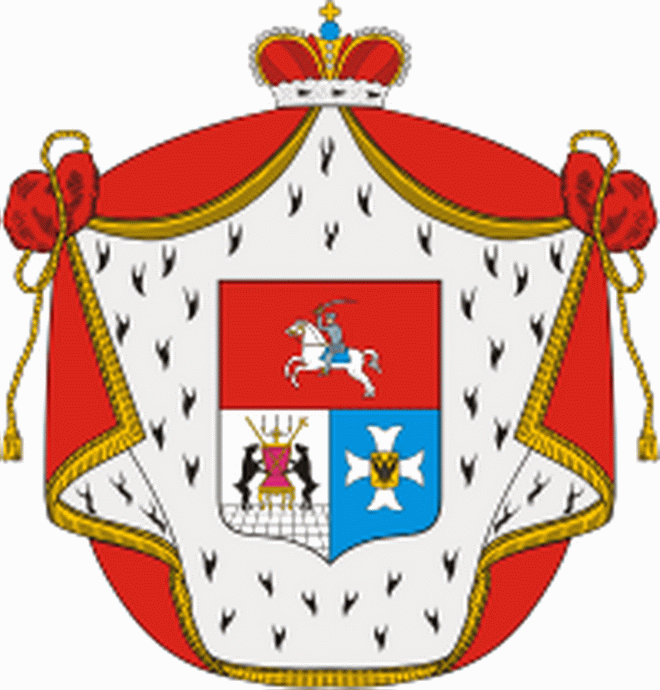
Coat of arms of the Golitsyn family

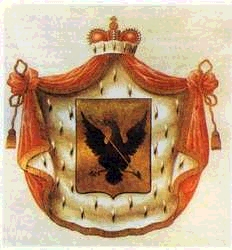
Coat of arms of the Gorchakov family

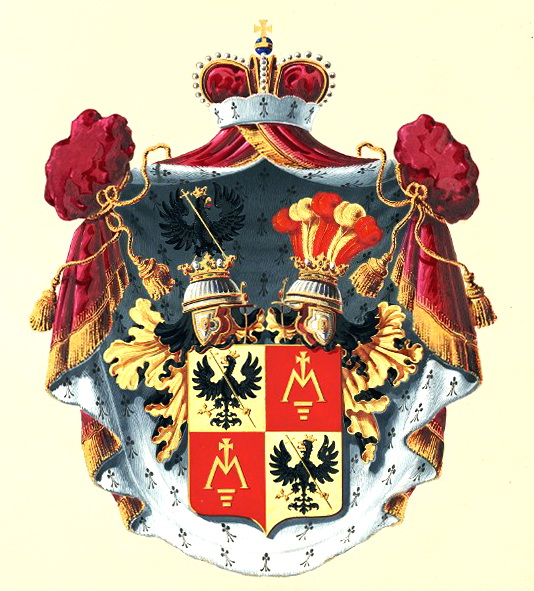
Coat of arms of the Mosalsky family

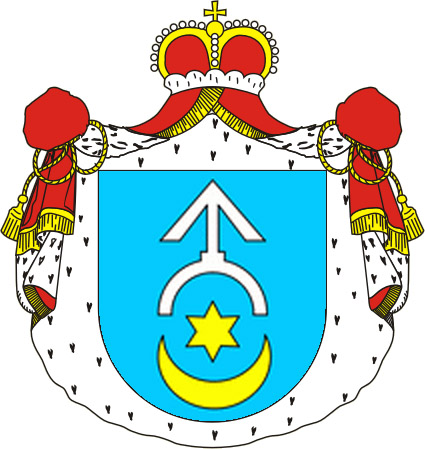
Coat of arms of the Ostrogski family

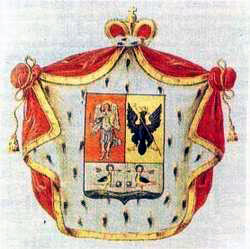
The Obolensky – Repnin coat of arms is composed of the emblems of Kyiv and Chernigov.

Coat of arms of the Romodanowski family

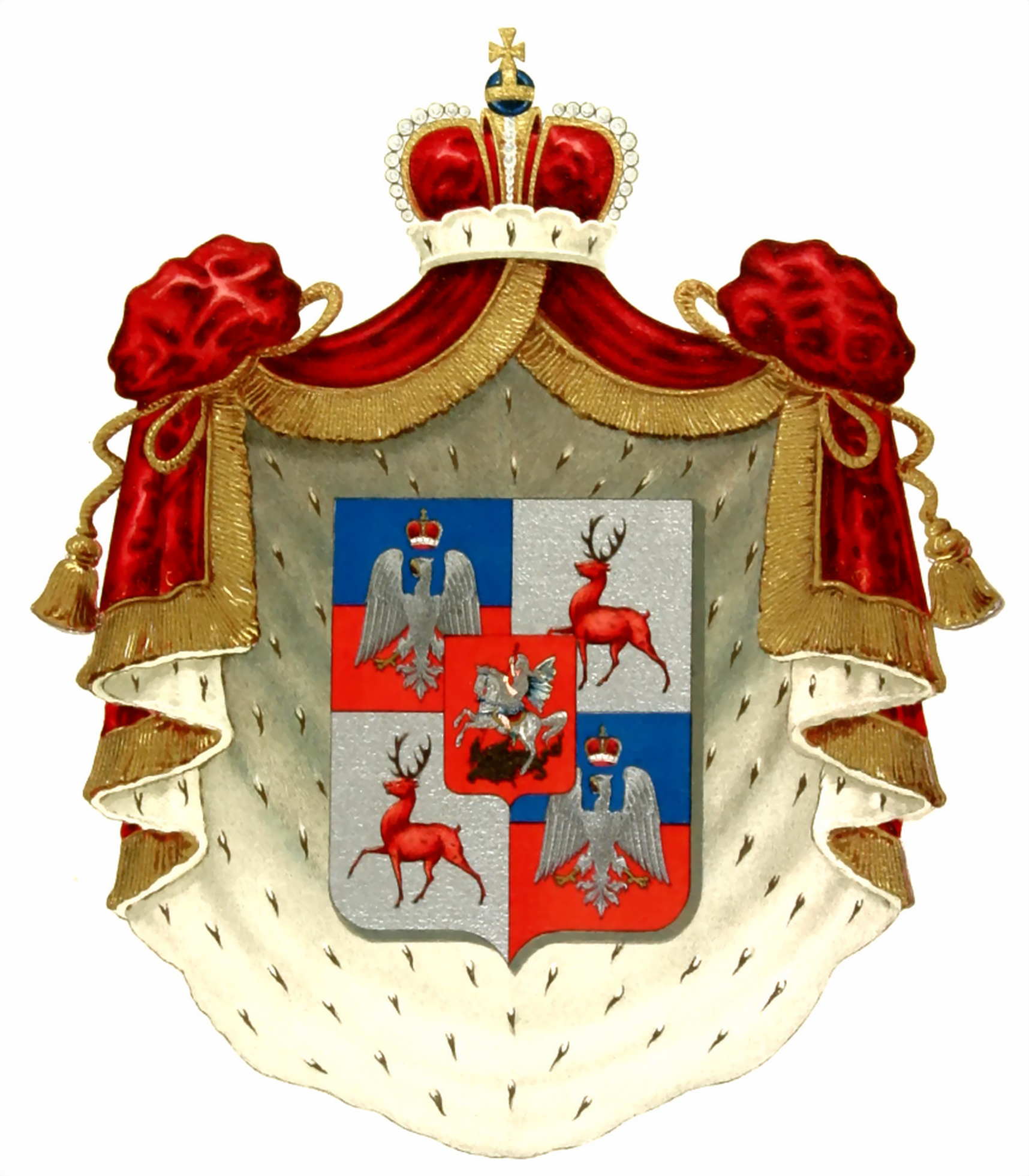
Coat of arms of the Shuyski family

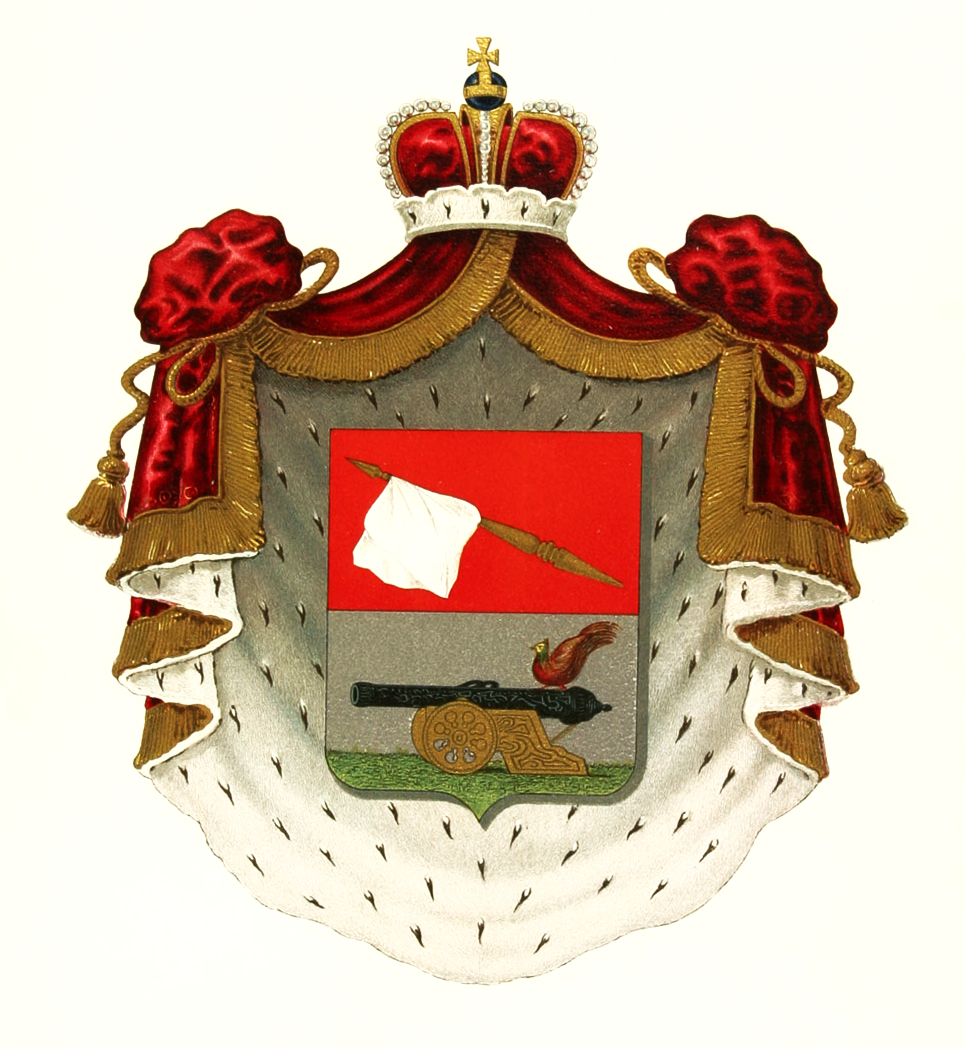
Coat of arms of the Tatischev family

Korybut coat of arms

== See also ==
- Grand Prince of Kiev
- Shum-gora
- Prince of Tver
- Knyaz
- Symbols of the Rurikids

== Bibliography ==
- Halperin, Charles J. (2022). The Rise and Demise of the Myth of the Rus' Land (PDF). Leeds: Arc Humanities Press. p. 107. ISBN 9781802700565.
- Martin, Janet (2004) [1995]. Medieval Russia: 980–1584. Cambridge: Cambridge University Press. ISBN 9780521368322.
- Ostrowski, Donald (2018). "Was There a Riurikid Dynasty in Early Rus'?". Canadian-American Slavic Studies. 52 (1): 30–49. doi:10.1163/22102396-05201009.
- Pelenski, Jaroslaw (1992). "The Contest for the "Kievan Inheritance" in Russian-Ukrainian Relations: The Origins and Early Ramifications" ( (PDF)). In Potichnyj, Peter J.; Pelenski, Jaroslaw; Raeff, Marc; Thekulin, Gleb (eds.). Ukraine and Russia in Their Historical Encounter. Proceedings of the First Conference on Russian-Ukrainian Relations, held in Hamilton, Canada, October 8–9, 1981) (PDF). Edmonton: CIUS Press, University of Alberta. pp. 3–19. ISBN 978-0-920862-84-1. Archived from the original on 27 February 2022.
- Raffensperger, Christian (2016). Ties of Kinship: Genealogy and Dynastic Marriage in Kyivan Rus'. Cambridge, Massachusetts: Harvard Ukrainian Research Institute. p. 418. ISBN 9781932650136.
