= Șeptilici family =

- Noble and princely family
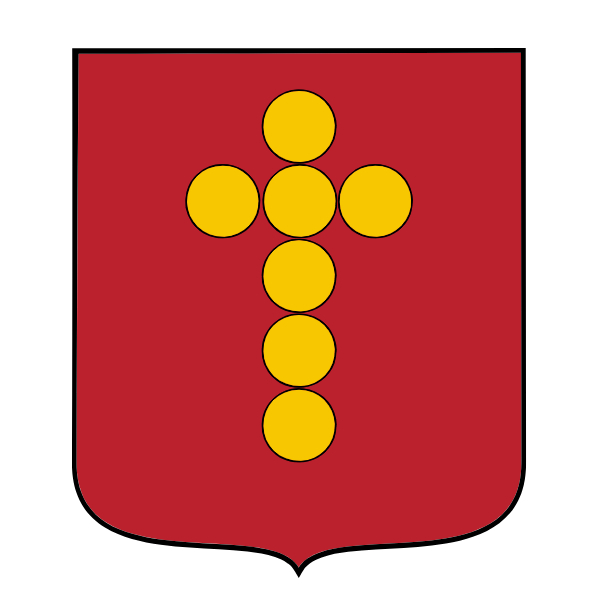
- Coat arms of Septilici
- Parent house: Rurik dynasty
- Country: Russian Empire; Moldavia
- Founded: 3 January 1588; 438 years ago
- Titles: Prince(ss) of Russian Empire
- Style: Your Excellency
- Estate: Burchi-Septilici
- Deposition: 1918

The Șeptilici family (also spelled Septilici, Șaptelici, Șeptelici) was a princely, noble family from Bukovina, in the Principality of Moldavia. It played a significant political, military role in the history of Moldavia, especially in the medieval and early modern periods.

Documented connections to the House of Obrenović (Serbian royalty), Cantacuzino (Byzantine dynasty). Other princely families such as Shakhovskoy, Svyatopolk-Mirsky, Rosetti, Sturdza, Bals and others.

== Origin ==
The origins of the Șeptilici family date back to the 15th century. The Șeptilici were included by Dimitrie Cantemir among the most important boyar (noble) families of Moldavia. The name of the family appears in internal documents as early as the 16th century, with reference to the reign of Petru Vodă Rareș.

The Șeptilici family was mentioned in royal documents during the reign of Stephen the Great (1457–1504), when the family began to gain recognition and influence.

== Connected families ==
The Septilici family, an established noble lineage from the historical region of Moldova, is connected through marriage and descent to several prominent European aristocratic and royal families:

Serbian Royalty: Through the marriage of Maria Kesco into the Septilici family, the Septilici are linked to Queen Natalie of Serbia (née Keșco), consort of King Milan I and mother of King Alexander I of Serbia.

Romanian Nobility: A connection to the influential Cantacuzino family was established through Aspasia Andrieș Septilici, one of Romania’s most historically significant noble houses, which claims descent from Byzantine imperial lines.

Russian Aristocracy: Constantin Andrieș Șeptilici, a notable member of the family, served as a court counselor in the Russian Empire and as Governor of Crimea. He was married to Princess Paraschiva Șahovsky, of the Shakhovskoy princely house one of Russia’s oldest noble families with Rurikid origins. Maria Septilici (also known as Princess Maria Andrias Septilici), born in the Chernivtsi region (Khotyn), married Prince Dmitri Sviatopolk-Mirski, connecting the family to the Svyatopolk-Mirsky princely dynasty.

The Septilici lineage is also associated with other prominent Moldavian boyar families, including the Rosetti, Sturdza and Bals families.

== History ==
=== Assassination of Voivode Gaspar Graziani ===
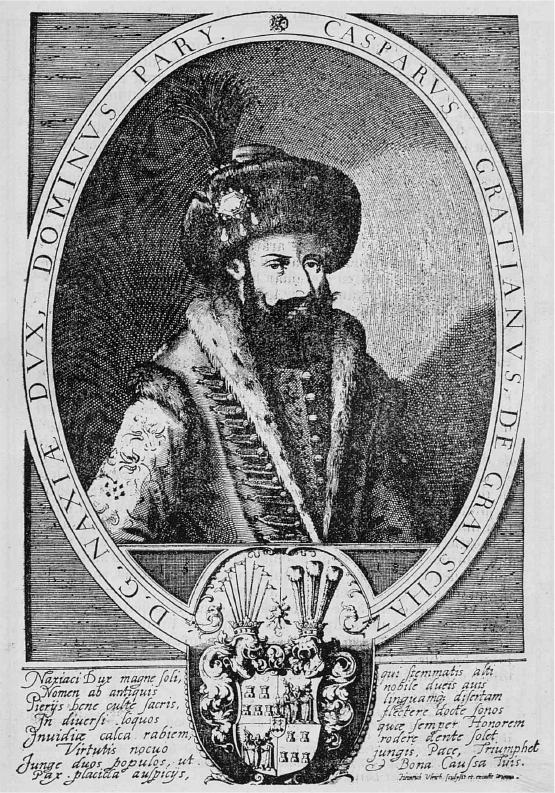
Gaspar Graziani

One of the most controversial events in which the noble family was involved was the assassination of ruler Gaspar Graziani (ruler of Moldavia between 1619 and 1620).

According to historical accounts, members of the Șeptilici and Goia families conspired against Graziani because of his dangerous policies and authoritarian tendencies. They saw in his elimination a way to prevent a possible Ottoman invasion and restore order in the principality.

His death was a landmark event in Moldavian history, and the Șeptilici family apparently played a significant role in the plot that led to his murder.

== Notable members ==
- Vasile Septilici - count, representative of the prince (hetman and burgrave of Suceava) (1610-1620).
- Ilie Septilici - count, representative of the prince, member of the princely council (hetman and burgrave of Suceava) (1658-1663).
- Gheorghe Septilici - logothete II, burgrave of Khotyn, Ukraine. (1666-1703).
- Andreica Septilici - commander of the vanguard, burgrave of Khotyn, Ukraine.
- Princess Aspasia Andrias-Septilici (née Cantacuzino) - married to Ion Septilici. (1822-1870).
- Princess Maria Andrias Svyatopolk-Mirsky (née Septilici) - married to Prince Dmitri Sviatopolk-Mirski, born in Ukraine, Khotyn, Chernivtsi (24.12.1898-)
- Prince Constantin Septilici - Governor of Crimea, settled in Russia in 1792, received from Catherine II the title of titular advisor and the rank of captain in the army. Later, in 1803, Alexander I promoted him, granting him the rank of Court Advisor, married to Princess Paraschiva Shakhovskoy.
- Prince Arcadie Septilici-Shakhovskoy - captain, young man was an orderly officer of King Carol I. He studied in military schools in Russia, his grandfather was Constantin Septilici, and his grandmother Princess Paraschiva Shakhovskoy, heir to the Burchi-Septilici house (November 29, 1839 - 1923).
- Ivan Petrovich Septilici - Russian-Moldovan politician, deputy of the Duma, and later elected chairman of the Beloyarsk Duma.
- Mircea Septilici - famous Romanian theater and film actor.

== Estates ==
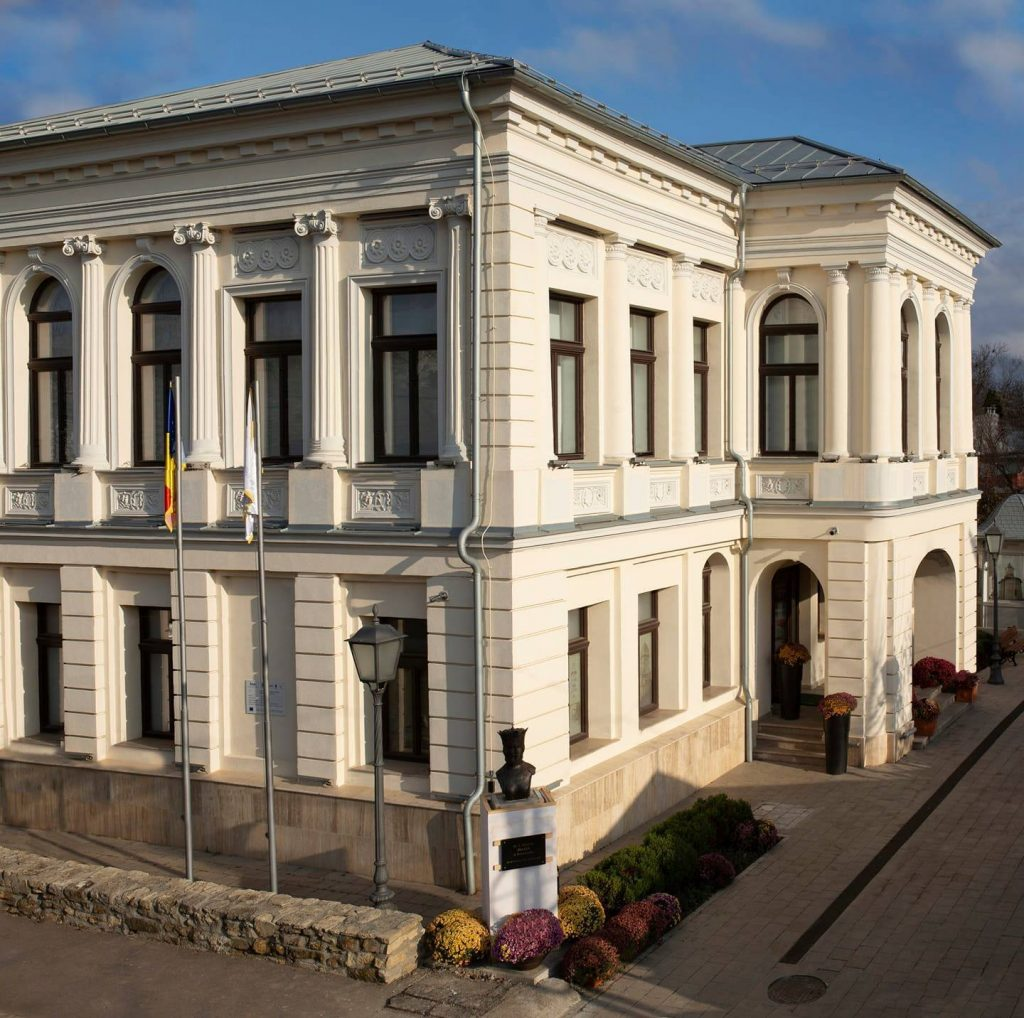
Burchi-Septilici, currently known as Museum Queen Maria

In 1907, an Ilie Șeptilici appears as the owner of the Burchi house. He was a descendant of Șeptilici the hetman, commander of the Moldavian army, beheaded in 1621 by Alexandru Iliaș Vodă. The Șeptilici family also had descendants in Moldova across the Prut (which became the Russian governorate of "Bessarabia" after 1812). His great-grandfather, Constantin Andries Șeptilici, former counselor in Russia and Governor of Crimea, is known; he was married to Princess Paraschiva Șahovsky.
