= Arcadie Șeptilici =

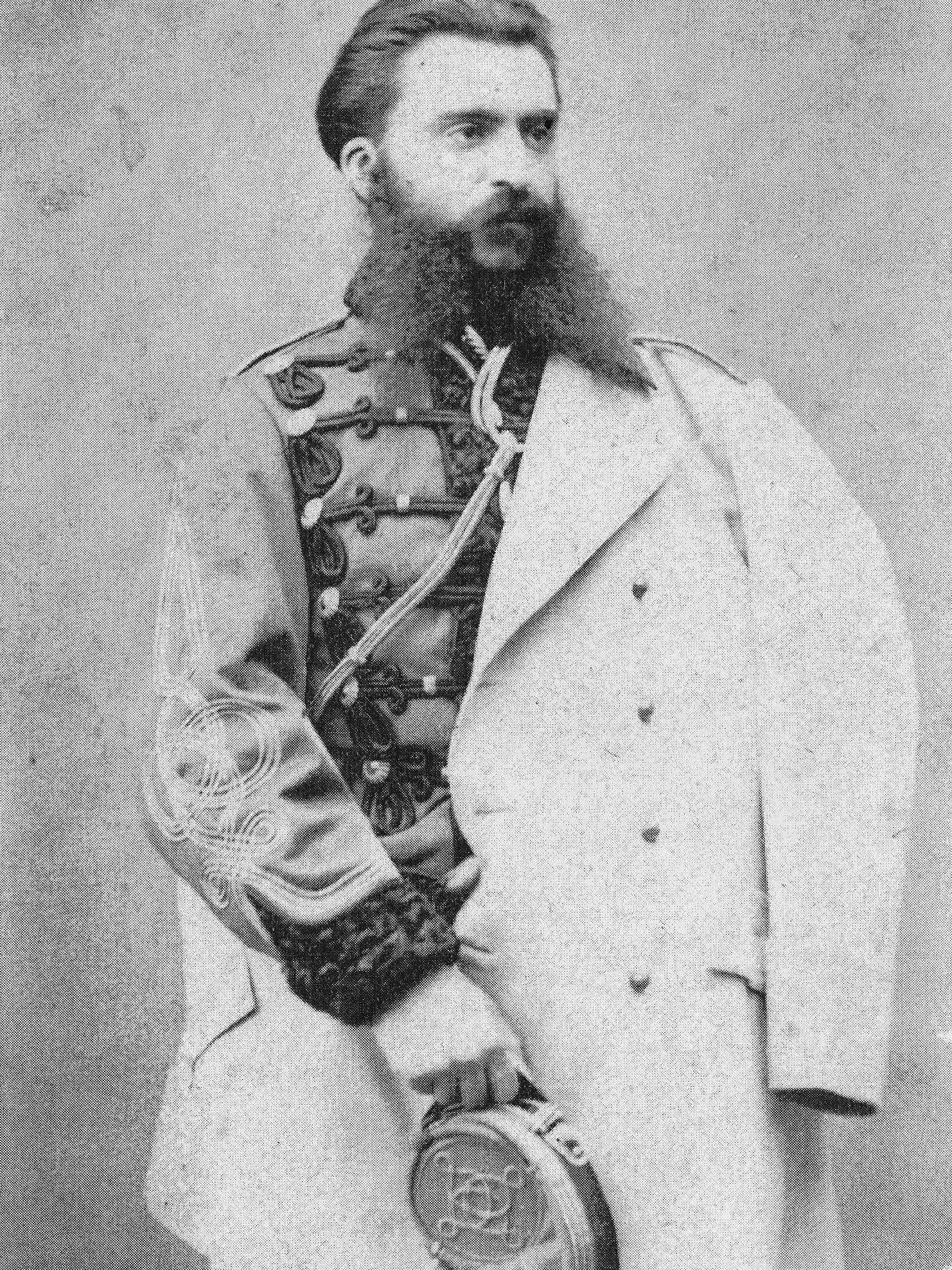
Arcadie Septilici

Prince Arcadie Septilici-Shakhovskoy (29 November 1839, Odesa – 1923) was a captain in Russo-Turkish war, Russian-Romanian noble from an old noble family Septilici. Remarked for his military service and loyalty for Romania. When young, it is said, that he was an batman officer for king Carol I. Arcadie studied military school in Russia. His grandfather was Constantin Septilici, and his grandmother princess Paraschiva Shakhovskoy.

Heir owner of the estate Burchi-Septilici, nowadays "Museum Queen Maria" from Iași.

== Biography ==
Born at Odessa in a noble family, his grandfather Constantin Septilici was governor of Crimeea, as consul decorated by Catherine the Great, also king Alexander I. His grandmother was part of princely house Shakhovskoy.
