= Vasile Șeptilici =

- Hetman Septilici

Burgrave (count), Hetman (marshal)
- Reign: 1610 – 1621
- Predecessor: Șeptilici Bătrânul
- Successor: Ilie Șeptilici
- Born: Moldavia
- Died: 1621; Moldavia
- Family: Septilici family
- Religion: Orthodoxy

Vasile Șeptilici (17th century) was a prominent Moldavian nobleman, known for his significant roles in the political and military spheres of the Principality of Moldavia. He served as hetman (army commander) and burgrave of Suceava in 1620, also being a trusted representative of the Moldavian prince. His rise to these high positions also included fulfilling the role of urednic of Suceava in 1610 and grand vâtaf in 1617.

== Assassination of The Prince ==
Vasile Șeptilici is best known for his involvement in the assassination of Prince Gaspar Graziani. After the Battle of Țuțora on 8 September 1621, where Polish and Moldavian forces were defeated by Turkish and Tatar armies, Graziani attempted to flee, but was killed by Vasile Șeptilici and Dumitru Goia. Șeptilici and other boyars felt that the country was heading in the wrong direction under Graziani's leadership and considered it necessary to intervene to remedy the situation. This act led to their execution by Prince Alexandru Vodă.

== Wealth ==
Despite the dramatic end of his political career, Vasile was active in land transactions, consolidating and expanding his estates in various regions, especially in Suceava. He owned significant properties in Văscăuți, including mills and ponds, and other estates in Nemerniceni and Căjvenii.
