= Andrey Gagarin =

- Prince Andrey Petrovich Gagarin
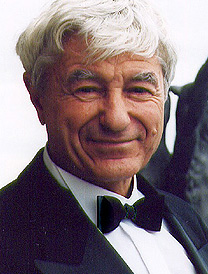
- Andrey Gagarin in Saint Petersburg in 2002
- Born: 9 July 1934; Leningrad, Russian SFSR, USSR
- Died: 30 January 2011 (aged 76); Maryland, USA
- Burial: Saint Petersburg, Russia
- Spouse: Tatiana Andreevna Shmit; Tatiana Valentinovna Jakovleva; Tatiana Ivanovna Nukhina
- Issue: Princess Maria Andreevna; Prince Dmitri Andreevich; Princess Julia Andreevna
- House: Gagarin, House of Rurik
- Father: Prince Peter Andreevich Gagarin
- Mother: Varvara Vasilievna Sheshina

Prince Andrey Petrovich Gagarin (Russian: Андрей Петрович Гагарин; 9 July 1934 – 30 January 2011) was a professor of physics at Saint Petersburg Polytechnical University.

== Ancestry and background ==
As the son of Prince Peter Andreevich Gagarin (Russian: Князь Петр Андреевич Гагарин, 1904–1938) and grandson of Prince Andrey Grigorievich Gagarin (Russian: Князь Андрей Григорьевич Гагарин, 1855–1920), Andrey Petrovich Gagarin walked in the footsteps of his closest ancestors. His father was a graduate of the same Polytechnical University for which his grandfather was the first rector, and at which Andrey Petrovich Gagarin held a professorship. His Great-grandfather was the diplomat, artist, officer and the vice-chancellor of the Imperial Academy of Arts Prince Grigory Grigorievich Gagarin (Russian: Князь Григорий Григорьевич Гагарин, 1810–1893), himself a son of Prince Grigory Ivanovich Gagarin (Russian: Князь Григорий Иванович Гагарин, 1782–1837), poet, diplomat and patron of the arts, later an ambassador to Rome.

After the Bolshevik seizure of power, most members of the Gagarin family left the country. Still some decided to stay, a decision that proved dire. In 1938 Andrey would become the last Gagarin heir on Russian soil, after his father Peter Andreevich was executed during one of Stalin's purges. His older brother Andrey Andreevich had been executed the year prior. This left young Andrey Petrovich Gagarin, at the age of 4, one of the very few surviving Rurikid princes in Russia. He was raised by his mother Princess Varvara Vasilievna Gagarina (née Sheshina, later remarried to Vadim Mikhailovich Burlakov). By using the surname of his stepfather (during 1947–1972), Andrey was able to obtain a higher education that would otherwise not have been accessible in Soviet Russia for a member of the former aristocracy.

Prince Andrey P. Gagarin served as the chairman of the Nobility assembly of St. Petersburg and was a long-time CILANE delegate.

== Marriages and Issue ==
Andrey Petrovich Gagarin had married three times. His first marriage was to Tatiana Andreevna Shmit, no issue. His second marriage was to Tatiana Valentinovna Jakovleva and had issue:

- Princess Maria Andreevna Gagarina.

His final marriage was to Tatiana Ivanovna Nukhina and had issue:

- Prince Dmitri Andreevich Gagarin (born 1973). Legitimated by parents marriage.
- Princess Julia Andreevna Gagarina. Legitimitated by parents marriage. Julia Gagarina is married to Jan Alexander von Heiroth.

== Title and dynastic branch ==
The title Knyaz (князь) is a Slavic title found in most Slavic languages, denoting a royal or a noble rank. It is usually translated into English as either Prince or less commonly as Duke. In Russia the title was originally a hereditary title for the patrilineal descendants of Rurik. The princes Gagarin are a cadet line of the House of Rurik, descending from the Monomakh branch of the Rurikids.
