= House of Lobanov-Rostovsky =

Russian princely family

Lobanov-Rostovsky
- Parent house: Rostov princes
- Country: Russian Empire
- Titles: Prince Lobanov-Rostovsky
- Style: His/Her Highness
- Estate: Lobanov-Rostovsky Residence

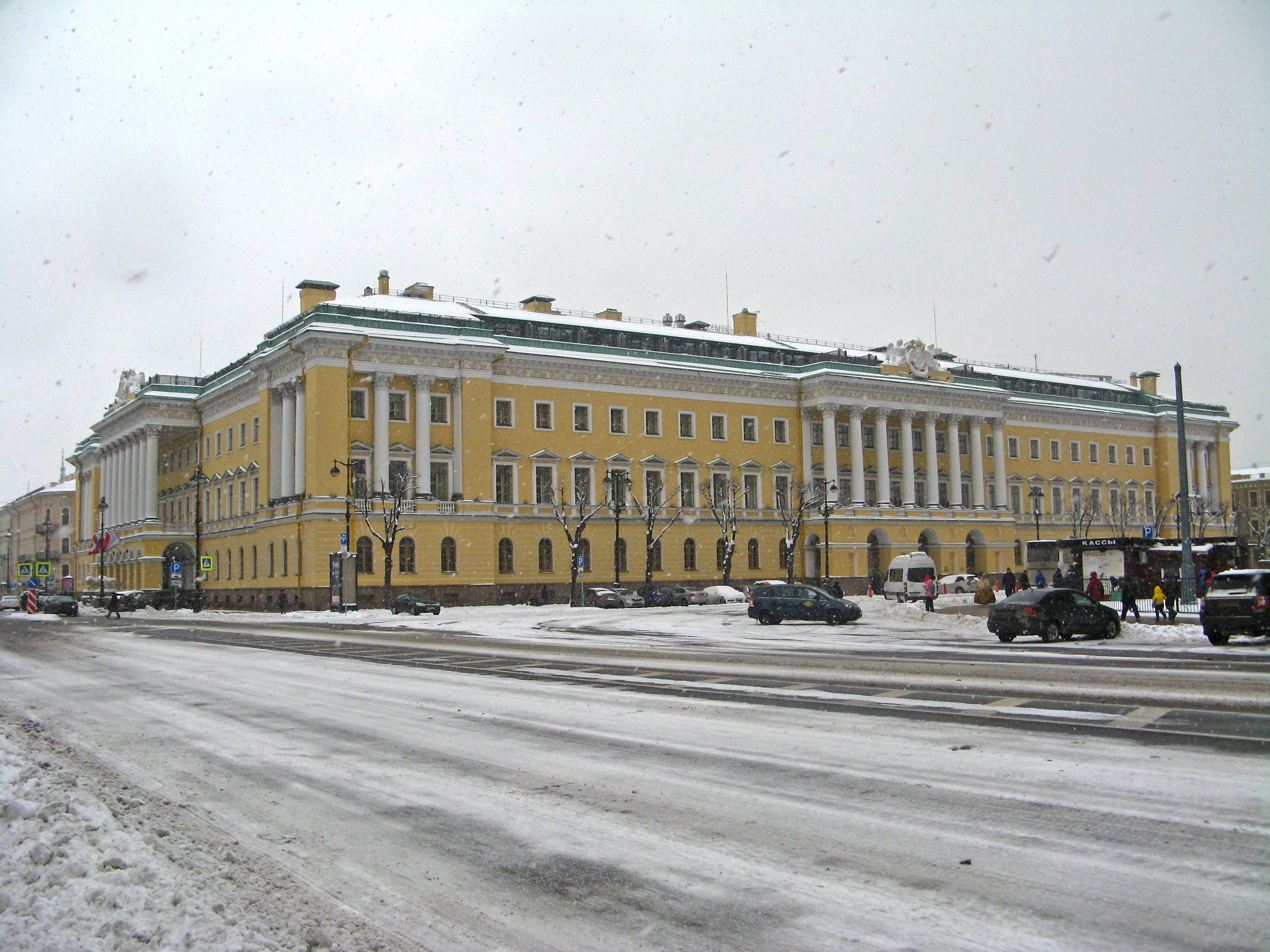
Lobanov-Rostovsky Palace, St.Petersburg

The House of Lobanov-Rostovsky (Russian: Лобановы-Ростовские, literally "Lobanov-Rostovskys") is a Russian princely family that claims their descent from the House of Rurik and whose male-line ancestors were the Rostov princes, who ruled the Principality of Rostov, the area now in the present-day Russia.

== History ==
It originated with Prince Ivan Rostovsky, nicknamed Loban (Лобан) for his wide forehead ("Лоб" means 'forehead' in Russian), who lived at the end of the 15th century and was a descendant of reigning princes of Rostov Veliky.

Some notable members of the family are listed in the "Lobanov-Rostovsky" article.

Their coat of arms has a divided shield: the upper part of blue color shows Archangel Gabriel, silver with golden halo and sword. The lower part in red shows a standing, gold-armed silver stag with a golden collar. Around the coat of arms are the princely insignia.

Among the (former) estate of the family is the Lobanov-Rostovsky Palace in downtown Saint Petersburg.

== Relatives ==
There are other (extinct) princely families that descended from Rostov princes: Bakhteyarov-Rostovsky and Golenin-Rostovsky.
