= Gorchakov =

Russian noble family

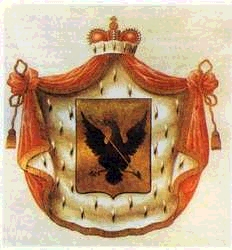
Coat of arms of the Gorchakov family

The House of Gorchakov, or Gortchakoff (Russian: Горчако́в), is a Russian noble family claiming descent from Michael of Chernigov, although it did not gain prominence until the 18th century.

== Aleksey Gorchakov ==
The family first achieved prominence during the reign of Catherine II. Prince Aleksey Ivanovich (1769–1817) served with distinction under his uncle Suvorov in the Turkish Wars, and took part as a general officer in the Italian and Swiss operations of 1799, and in the war against Napoleon in Poland in 1806–1807 (Battle of Heilsberg). He succeeded Barclay de Tolly as the Minister of War in 1813. His brother Andrei Ivanovich Gorchakov (1776–1855) was a general in the Russian army who took a conspicuous part in the final campaigns against Napoleon.

== Pyotr Gorchakov ==
Prince Peter Dmitrievich Gorchakov (1790–1868) served under Mikhail Kamensky and Mikhail Kutuzov in the campaign against Turkey, and afterwards against France in 1813–1814. In 1820 he suppressed an insurrection in the Caucasus, for which service he was raised to the rank of major-general. In 1828–1829 he fought under Prince Peter von Wittgenstein against the Turks, won an action at Aidos, and signed the treaty of peace at Adrianople. In 1839 he was made governor of Eastern Siberia, and in 1851 retired into private life.

When the Crimean War broke out he offered his services to the emperor Nicholas, by whom he was appointed general of the VI army corps in the Crimea. He commanded the corps in the battles of Alma and Inkerman. He retired in 1855 and died at Moscow, on March 18, 1868.

== Mikhail Gorchakov ==
Prince Mikhail Dmitrievich (1795–1861), brother of the last named, was appointed commander-in-chief of the Russian troops which occupied Moldavia and Wallachia after the outbreak of the Crimean War. In 1854 he crossed the Danube and besieged Silistria, but was superseded in April by Prince Ivan Paskevich, who, however, resigned on June 8, when Gorchakov resumed the command.

In 1855 Gorchakov was appointed commander-in-chief of the Russian forces in the Crimea in place of the disgraced Prince Menshikov. Gorchakov's defence of Sevastopol, and final retreat to the northern part of the town, which he continued to defend till peace was signed in Paris, were conducted with lack of energy. In 1856 he was appointed governor-general of Poland in succession to Prince Paskevich. He died at Warsaw on May 30, 1861, and was buried, in accordance with his own wish, at Sevastopol.

== Alexander Gorchakov ==
Prince Alexander Mikhailovich Gorchakov (1798–1883) served as Chancellor of the Russian Empire (in office from 1867) during the reign of Emperor Alexander II (r. 1855–1881). He was educated at the Tsarskoye Selo Lyceum, where he had the poet Alexander Pushkin as a school-fellow. In 1820–22 he accompanied Foreign Minister Karl Nesselrode to the Holy Alliance congresses at Troppau, Laibach, and Vienna.

Gorchakov was appointed Foreign Minister in April 1856 soon after the end of the Crimean War of 1853 to 1856; he represented the Russian Empire at the Paris Congress of 1856. His main objective was to restore Russia's international prestige after the bitter defeat. At first he steered the country towards an alliance with Napoleon III of France, but rebuffed by the latter's support of the January Uprising in Poland, joined his archrival Otto von Bismarck in setting up the League of the Three Emperors in 1873. Following France's defeat in the Franco-Prussian War of 1870–1871, Gorchakov succeeded in his long-term goal or revising the key clauses of the Paris Treaty, especially those containing Russia's interests in the Black Sea.

The aged chancellor was so disgusted by the modification of the Treaty of San Stefano at the Berlin Congress of 1878 that in 1882 he laid down all his offices and settled into retirement. He died some months later.

== In popular culture ==
The Gorchakov family play a central role in 1636: The Kremlin Games and other works in the Russian thread of the 1632 alternate history science fiction series.
