= Traumatic brain injury modeling =

Traumatic brain injury modeling replicates aspects of traumatic brain injury (TBI) as a method to better understand what physically happens to the brain. Researchers use a variety of models for this process, with different models able to replicate certain aspects of TBI while also producing their own limitations.

An estimated 1.7 million cases of TBI occur per year, not taking into account the lasting affects that TBI may cause. TBI is also reported as a contributing factor in about 30% of all injury related death. Given how prevalent TBI is, preventing or minimizing its effects would benefit many people worldwide.

Models bring advantages and disadvantages to TBI research. They are good at representing one observable aspect but must ignore other aspects. For example, a researcher may study blunt impacts with a neuronal cell culture model that is the depth of the cortical layer. The researcher subjects this to different impact sizes, shapes, and forces to see how cells react and what cytokines they release. This model works well for the cortical layer, but ignores deeper cell layers due to the inability to oxygenate a deeper cell culture effectively. In this experiment, the disadvantage and limitation of this model is cell depth. It gathers accurate information within the cortical layer, but ignores interactions that might occur below the cortical layer.

== Damage on a cellular level ==
TBI occurs when neurons in the brain experience stresses and strains that exceed their threshold for elastic deformation. Diffuse Axonal Injury (DAI) has been found to occur when strain exceeds 10%, and strain rates exceed 10 meters per second. Once this threshold is passed, cells begin to die due to apoptosis, or simply from the rupturing of cell membranes. The death of neurons is compounded by the fact that neurons do not undergo mitosis unless very specific conditions are met; not only are the cells removed, but they are also not replaced by new neurons. This, in turn, means that a person experiencing multiple TBIs in a similar area suffers the culmination of all previous injuries, possibly up to four times the initial damage.

In addition to the physical stresses and strains that neurons experience during TBI, cell-cell interactions also contribute to the damage, primarily due to the formation of a glial scar. Neurons release cytokines during TBI that have a variety of effects, including summoning astrocytes to the afflicted area. Once they arrive, the astrocytes begin to generate more cytoskeletal structures until the damaged region is completely sealed. While this does create chemical and physical stability in the area, this scarring prevents any self-healing processes from occurring.

These processes are part of the natural damage response mechanisms, which also include the brain experiencing a pro-inflammatory response at the location of damage that is regulated by an anti-inflammatory response that is farther away from the damaged area. In addition to this response, there is also a general haemodynamic response function that follows TBI.

== Common Types of TBI ==
=== Blast-induced ===
Blast-Induced TBI results from wave propagation from a blast source through the brain. These injuries are most commonly found on the battlefield, as explosions occur close enough to humans that the high intensity waves apply stresses and strains that greatly surpass neuron elastic thresholds. As the wave passes through the skull, cerebrospinal fluid, and through the brain, neurons undergo sequences of tension and compression for the duration of the blast wave. Even very short blast waves with high intensity can cause immediate cell death, even through the cerebrospinal fluid buffer. Blast-Induced damage is not localized to a specific region due to its wave nature, and can penetrate deep into the brain before finally subsiding, depending on the blast intensity and proximity.

=== Impact-induced ===
Impact damage is the most common type of TBI, estimated at 75% of all TBI injuries, and results from the brain making physical contact with the skull. Impact-induced TBI is localized to the region of impact, although the depth varies by person and force of impact. While cerebrospinal fluid normally acts as a buffer between the brain and skull, during moments of extreme force (i.e. car collision or physical contact sports), this barrier can be overcome, resulting in an impact as the brain rams into the skull. During the moment of impact, some neurons die immediately from being crushed, while other neurons may be damaged to varying degrees and undergo apoptosis. Concussions are the most common and least damaging form of impact-induced TBI.

== Types of TBI models ==
=== in vitro ===
in vitro models are the most versatile method, because they facilitate analyzing any aspect of TBI, as long as a model is created to do so. in vitro models are useful for measuring forces among neurons, as there is much more freedom of space and time to measure the forces, as opposed to trying to fit the sensors in the brain itself. Using in vitro models alone, however, does not produce a complete understanding of all TBI mechanisms, due to the specialization of each model. As the model becomes more specialized, general overarching effects that may be present in the live model are removed.

Many experiments have been conducted in attempts to create a general model for the mechanical tolerance of neurons within the Central Nervous System (CNS). One such in vitro model has found that CNS neurons have a lower threshold for stress and strain loads than Peripheral Nervous System (PNS) neurons.

=== in vivo ===
in vivo models are the opposite end of the spectrum. These models sacrifice specialization to observe brain reactions in the context of the whole body. While this gives a better understanding of the reactions to TBI as a whole, in vivo models have many effects that are not solely due to the injury. These effects may a misattribution of the observed events to the injury, while in truth they are unrelated. To sort out irrelevant effects, in vitro models mimic what was found with the in vivo model. Running these iterations helps find true causes and effects of TBI, which in turn helps future research mitigate these causes and effects. in vivo TBI models, including rats, mice, zebrafish, or drosophila offer easy access to a living brain that can be analyzed. Mouse TBI models exhibit motor, memory, and emotion-related behavioral deficits.

=== Mathematical ===
Mathematical models differ greatly from in vivo and in vitro models, as cells are not usually required. Instead, a mathematical model or method for analysis is chosen and then solved with given information. A basic model is a simple differential equation that would be solved according to the initial or boundary conditions that are present in the model. For example, knowing that DAI occurs when strain exceeds 10% and strain rates exceed 10 meters per second helps researchers calculate projected damage to the brain using a finite element model. This basic model, however, would give such an estimate so rough that it would most likely prove useless unless it modeled a very general event. As more factors are considered, a mathematical model becomes increasingly difficult to solve. To simplify this, researchers make assumptions and approximations that, while making the model easier to solve, also lose a little validity due to the simplified terms (similar to in vivo and in vitro models). The assumptions, approximations, and corresponding losses vary according to the model. An example of a mathematical modeling is using the finite element method and solving the model using a coupled Lagrangian–Eulerian method.

Mathematical models are usually not created for a specific analysis. This means that these models are usually adapted variations applied to a specific event, resulting in the model itself having limitations with respect to the event being analyzed (before losses due to assumptions are considered). While this may be acceptable for certain analyses, more specific events may require the creation of a new mathematical model.

== Difficulties and limitations of TBI modeling ==
The brain is the most complex and least understood organ in the body, resulting in modeling the brain as a whole virtually impossible with current technology. To compensate for this complexity, models for the brain must be explicitly defined as to what exactly they model. Doing this inevitably results in many well defined models for different parts of the brain. However, they are all taken out of context of the 'whole brain', meaning that brain models do not incorporate aspects such as spatial and depth characteristics that a whole brain would have to prevent damage.

== Future applications ==
While modeling itself only gives estimations, research based on these estimations could give rise to amazing technology. For example, a human head and combat helmet were modeled under blast waves, and the results showed that the helmet did very little to stop blast-induced damage. With this information, a new type of combat helmet could be created that minimizes the damage that blast waves can cause. This technology could then also be applied to general armor, or even clothing (blast waves damage internal organs as well). This kind of advancement is only the beginning of TBI reduction. Methods such as genetic manipulation may also become available. These could increase the stress and strain thresholds for neurons, or perhaps present modeling will lead to methods for healing the brain altogether.

Nanotechnology may have a large future impact on TBI. The extremely small size and high variance of nanoparticles create countless possibilities for the future of not only TBI, but science in general. For instance, nanoparticles or nanomachines that stay in the brain could create tropic factors, which aid in guiding neurons, and trophic factors, which give the neuron nutrients needed to survive and grow. If this could occur as soon as the damage happens, TBI would be reduced by a large amount. Unfortunately, nanotechnology, and specifically nanomedicine, are very new fields of study. Many nanoparticles exhibit toxic effects throughout the body due to their size and reactivity. These effects would only be amplified in the vulnerable neurons within the brain, causing more damage than they repair.
