= Gagarin family =

Princely family of Russia

Gagarin
- Princely arms of the Gagarin family
- Parent house: Monomakhovichi
- Country: Russian Empire
- Titles: Prince Gagarin
- Style: His/Her Highness

The House of Gagarin (Russian: Гага́рин) is an ancient Russian princely family descending from Monomakhovichi, sovereign rulers of Starodub-on-the-Klyazma, a branch of the Rurik dynasty.

== Origins ==
Yaroslav Vsevolodovich II of Vladimir (died 1246) gave to his younger brother, Prince Ivan Vsevolodich 'kasha' (1197–1247) the appanage of Starodub.

The great-great-grandson of this Prince Ivan, Prince Ivan Fedorovich, called Lapa-Golibesovskoy, had a grandson, Ivan Mikhailovich Gagara, whose descendants, the Princes Gagarin, served the Russian throne as boyars and in other distinguished positions.

They were granted fiefdoms for their service to the tsar. Members of the family held the title of Knyaz in the Russian Empire.

== Notable figures ==
- Prince Nikolai Sergeevich Gagarin (князь Николай Сергеевич Гагарин) (July 12, 1784 – July 25, 1842).
- Prince Grigory Grigorevich Gagarin (Григорий Григорьевич) (1810–1893).
- Prince Pavel Ivanovich Gargarin (1798–1860?), father of philosopher Nikolai Fedorov
