= Nikita Lobanov =

Russian geologist, banker and art collector (born 1935)

Nikita Dmitrievich Lobanov-Rostovsky
- Никита Дмитриевич Лобанов-Ростовский
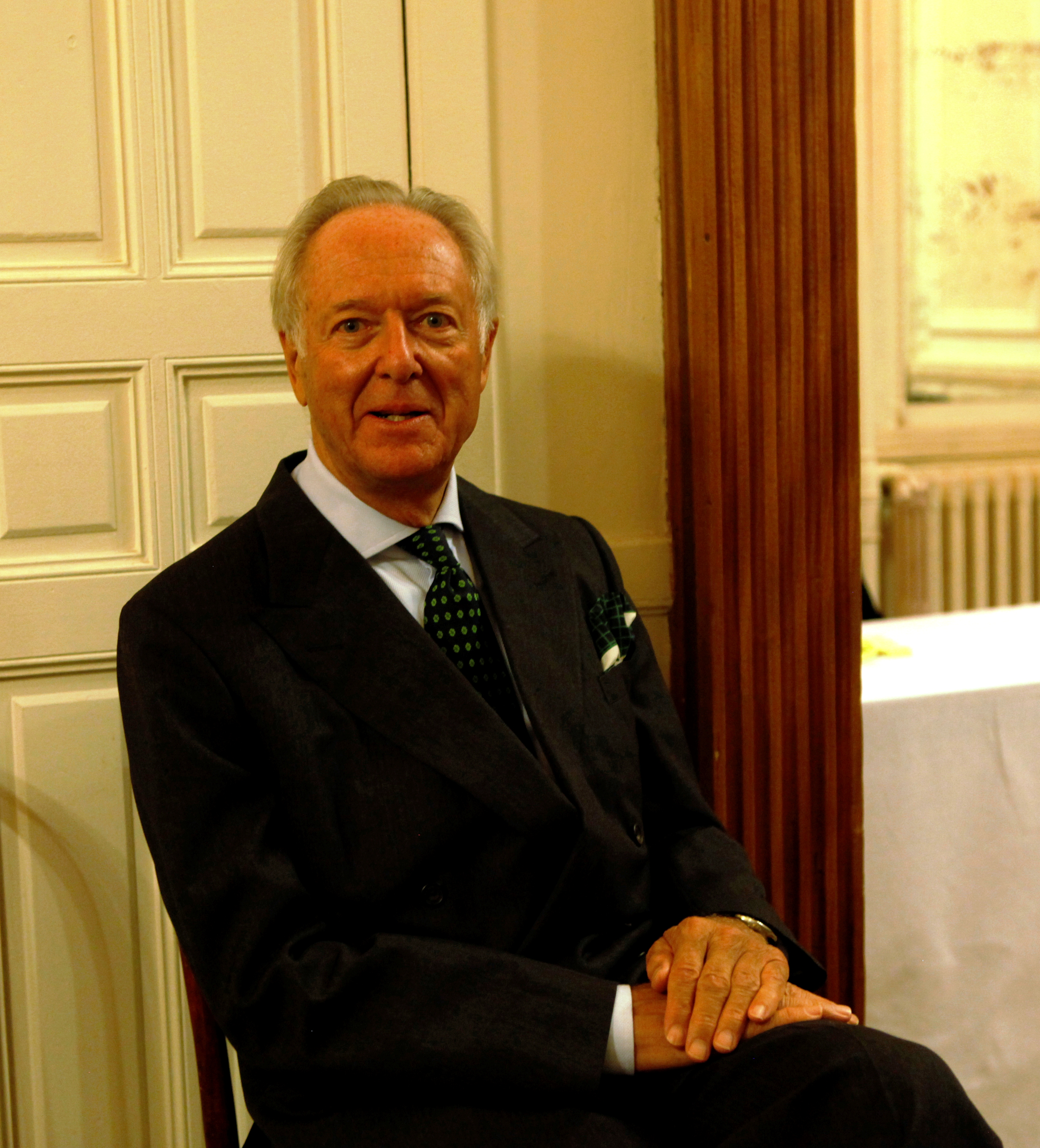
- Lobanov in 2011
- Born: 6 January 1935 (age 91); Sofia, Bulgaria
- Education: Oxford (BA, MA, geology, 1958), Columbia University (MS, economic geology, 1960), New York University (MBA, accounting, 1962)
- Occupations: geologist, banker
- Known for: collection of Russian Stage and Costume Design
- Spouse(s): 1. Nina Georges-Picot; 2. June Lobanov-Rostovsy (née Marsham-Towshend)

Prince Nikita Dmitrievich Lobanov-Rostovsky (Russian: Никита Лобанов, Никита Дмитриевич Лобанов-Ростовский) (born 6 January 1935), known as Nikita Lobanov, is a Russian and American geologist, banker, and notable art collector of Russian stage design of the period of 1880–1930 (in particular designs for Ballets Russes).

== Biography ==
=== Childhood and youth ===
A relative of the diplomat and Minister of Foreign Affairs of the Russian Empire, Alexey Borisovich Lobanov-Rostovsky. Son of Dmitry Ivanovich Lobanov-Rostovsky (1907-1948) and Irina Vasilyevna (1911-1957), daughter of V. V. Wyrubov. His uncle (his mother's brother) is Nikolai Vasilyevich Vyrubov (1915-2009), a member of the French Resistance and a Knight of the Legion of Honor and Ordre de le Liberastion.

His grandfather, Prince Ivan Nikolaevich (1866 – October 13, 1947), left Russia with his sons in 1919. Nikita was born in Bulgaria, where the entire family settled.

In 1946, after Soviet troops entered Bulgaria, he and his parents unsuccessfully attempted to cross the Greek border: the family was arrested on Greek territory. The 11-year-old boy fell ill from malnutrition and was transferred to a criminal prison, the Sofia Central Prison, where conditions were better. He spent a year in prison; his mother and father was released six months later. However, in 1948, Dmitry Lobanov-Rostovsky was kidnapped by Bulgarian state security agencies and, as his son only discovered in 1992, was executed in a death camp near the city of Pazardzhik.(Camp "C").

On doctor's advice, to avoid rickets, Nikita took up swimming, and in 1951 he became Bulgarian youth champion in the 100- and 200-meter breaststroke. In September 1953, Nikita and his emigrated to Paris. He received assistance from his uncle, Nikolai Vasilyevich Vyrubov, one of de Gaulle's closest Russian friends, who worked at the UN High Commissioner for Refugees, and from the future lbest selling novelist and close friend of de Gaulle Romain Gary (Deputy Ambassador of France to Bulgaria).

In 1956, Irina died, and while his mother was still alive, in 1954 Nikita, having received a scholarship from a refugee aid organization, moved to England to prepare for admission to Oxford University's Geology Department. It was then that he first saw the art he would dedicate his life to collecting, attending an exhibition in London dedicated to Sergei Diaghilev's "Seasons of the Russian Ballet." He was taken there by his godmother, Ekaterina Ridley, granddaughter of Count Benckendorff, the last ambassador of the Russian Tsar to England.

=== Career ===
He graduated from Oxford University in 1958. He moved to the United States to continue his education, enrolling in the Department of Geology at Columbia University in New York City, specializing in economic geology (ore deposit geology). He received his master's degree in 1960.He worked at the private bank Lobe Roads, explored oil in Patagonia (Argentina), and studied Spanish. Later, he prospected for mercury in Tunisia and Alaska, nickel in Venezuela, iron (itibarite) in Liberia, and worked in diamond mines in the Kalahari Desert in South Africa.

Returning to New York, he worked at Chemical Bank (now Morgan Chase Bank) and entered the evening department of New York University to study banking.

In 1962, he earned a master's degree in banking accounting, and at the same time married Nina Georges-Picot, the daughter of the French ambassador to the UN and the first deputy secretary-general of the UN.

From 1961 to 1967, he served the international of Chemical Bank.

From 1967 to 1970, he was assistant vice president of Bache & Co, also in New York.

From 1970 to 1979, he was vice president of Wells Fargo Bank in San Francisco, also heading its division Europe, the Middle East, and Africa.

From 1979 to 1983, he served as senior vice president of International Resources and Finance Bank in London.

After 1974, he visited the USSR numerous times on business for the banks where he worked, and met with the country's top government officials.

From 1987 to 1997, he was an advisor to the South African diamond monopoly De Beers.

He is a member of the American Association of Petroleum Geologists and the American Institute of Mining, Metallurgical, and Petroleum Engineers.

In 1979, the couple moved from San Francisco to London.

== Collecting and Philanthropy ==
Together with his first wife, Nina, he began collecting works of theater costumes and set designs by Russian artists from the first half of the 20th century. He first visited the USSR in 1970, together with his wife, at the invitation of the Central State Archive of Literature and Art (TsGALI), where he donated Sergei Sudeikin's archive. With TsGALI's assistance, he was introduced to leading collectors in Moscow, Leningrad, and Kyiv.

He is an advisor to Christie's auction house, and later to Sotheby's, which evaluated valued his collection every two to three years. He was a board member of the Theatre Museum Association in London and a life member of the Union of Benefactors of the Metropolitan Museum of Art in New York.

In 1967, he published a directory of theater designers, "Who's Who and Where?" (an encyclopedia of Russian stage artists).

He is a life member of the Union of Benefactors of the Metropolitan Museum of Art in New York, a member of the Governing Council of the Cyril and Methodius Foundation in Sofia, a member of the board of the Institute of Contemporary Russian Culture in Los Angeles (California), a member of the Society of Collectors in Moscow and London, an academician of the International Information Academy at the UN in Geneva.

Lobanov-Rostovsky has endowed the Lobanov-Rostovsky Professorship in Earth Sciences at the University of Oxford, his alma mater, along with the annual Lobanov-Rostovsky Lecture in Planetary Geology. Scientists who have contributed extensively to the study of the Universe through the lenses of geology have been speakers, including the prominent Bernard Wood, speaker of the 2022 Lecture. He has endowed a position for a lecturer in organic chemistry at Christ Church in the name of his tutor Dr. P .Kent

Collection (N. & N. Lobanov-Rostovsky collection)

"The beginning of my collection was Sergei Sudeikin's costume sketches for the ballet "Petrushka," says Nikita Dmitrievich. "I bought them for $25 each." Lobanov-Rostovsky recalls the early stages of his collecting romantically: "I had no money. But then I developed a detective hobby. In the first years of my collecting, I worked during the day, had dinner, and from eight in the evening until eleven at night I did nothing but research russian theatrical art. At first, I found out which Russian artists lived where and at what address. I spent a lot of time with émigré artists. It was a world of poor people. Back then, no one needed their art. Many had already died. And widows or children didn't know what to do with their artistic inheritance. It disappeared gradually. There's a lot of Muslim in me. I don't drink vodka. I drink tea. And long conversations over tea in the homes of Benois, Dobuzhinsky, and Larionov bore fruit. In a foreign land, to talk about your past, to reminisce, to pour out your soul—is there any greater joy? In those years, seeing my interest and poverty, they would simply give me things, like Boris Pasternak's sisters, or sell me stage designs, costume sketches, and sketches for a modest price. We lived on two salaries: mine and my wife Nina's. We used one to buy paintings. That's how our collection was assembled in Europe and North and South America. I understood perfectly well then that I was fulfilling a mission: saving Russian art, which would have simply sunk into oblivion."

By 1980, he had amassed 90% of his collection. The collection is considered the world's largest private collection of Russian theater and decorative art, comprising approximately 1,100 works by 177 artists. The Lobanov-Rostovsky Collection spans 50 years of theater design, with a particular emphasis on the period from 1905 to 1925. It features works by Léon Bakst, Alexandre Benois, Natalia Goncharova, Konstantin Korovin, Mikhail Larionov, Chagal, Kandinsky, Malevich, Vrubel and others.

Since 1964, the collection has been exhibited at 50 venues in the United States and Canada, since 1982 in Moscow and Western Europe, and since 1998 in Japan. "This is one of the rare private collections that has traveled from exhibition to exhibition, from country to country, for 40 years, essentially without a permanent home," he says. The paintings, including the world's finest Baksts for Diaghilev's companies, were stored in warehouses in Germany, professionally packaged and always ready to embark on their next journey.

American art historian John Bowlt writes: "The Lobanov collection became a unique repository of many cultural treasures, saved from inevitable destruction and oblivion. The erudition and enthusiasm of the Lobanov-Rostovsky couple brought many artists' names and achievements back from oblivion. Only fanatical dedication to preserving Russian art and a passionate love for it could have inspired such a difficult undertaking as the creation of this unique collection."

Some works from the Lobanov collection

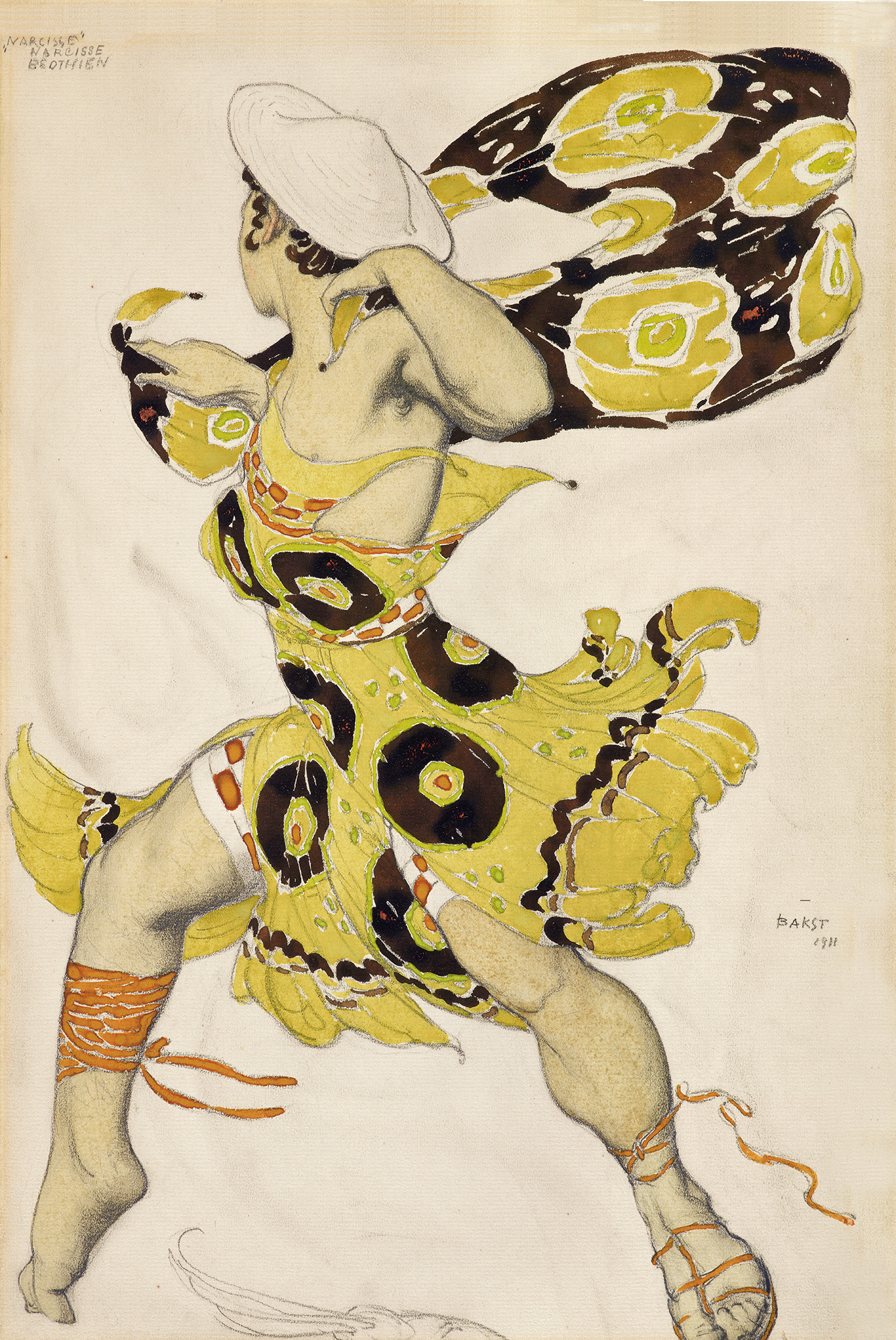
Léon Bakst, Narcisse

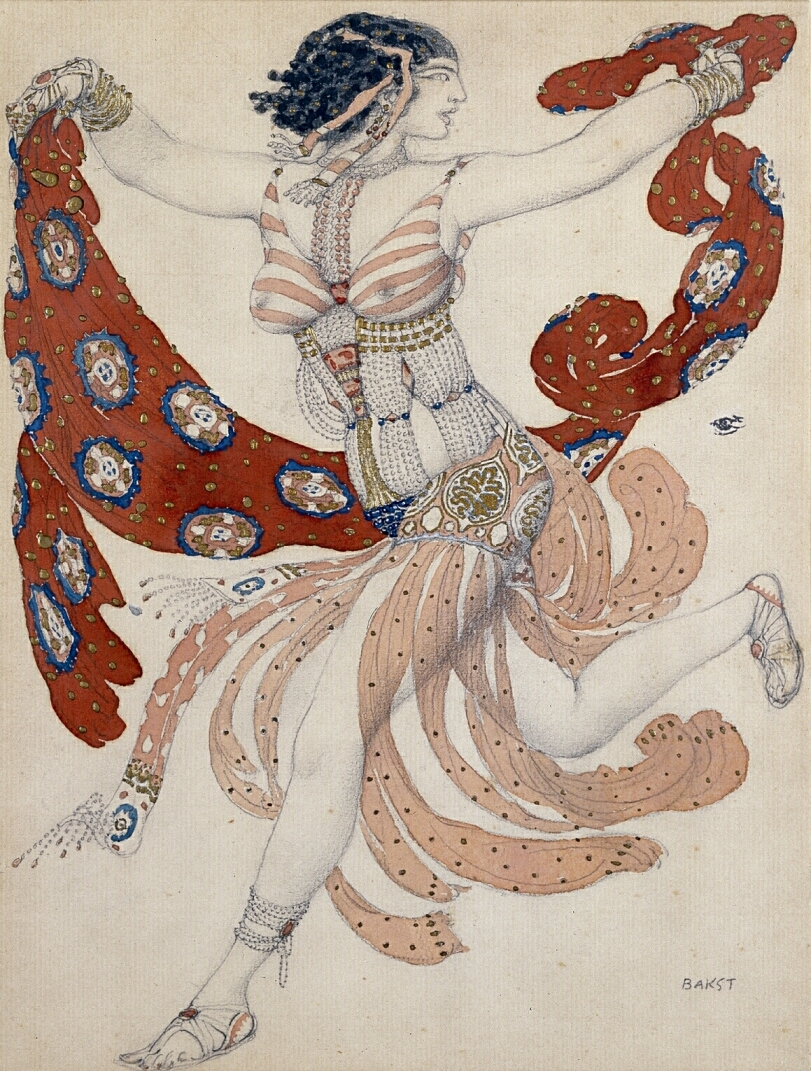
Léon Bakst, Costume of Cleopatra for Ida Rubinstein

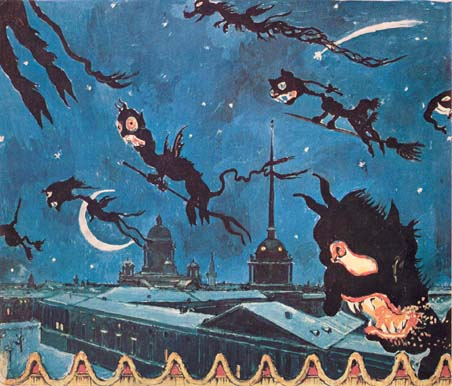
Alexandre Benois, Petrouchka

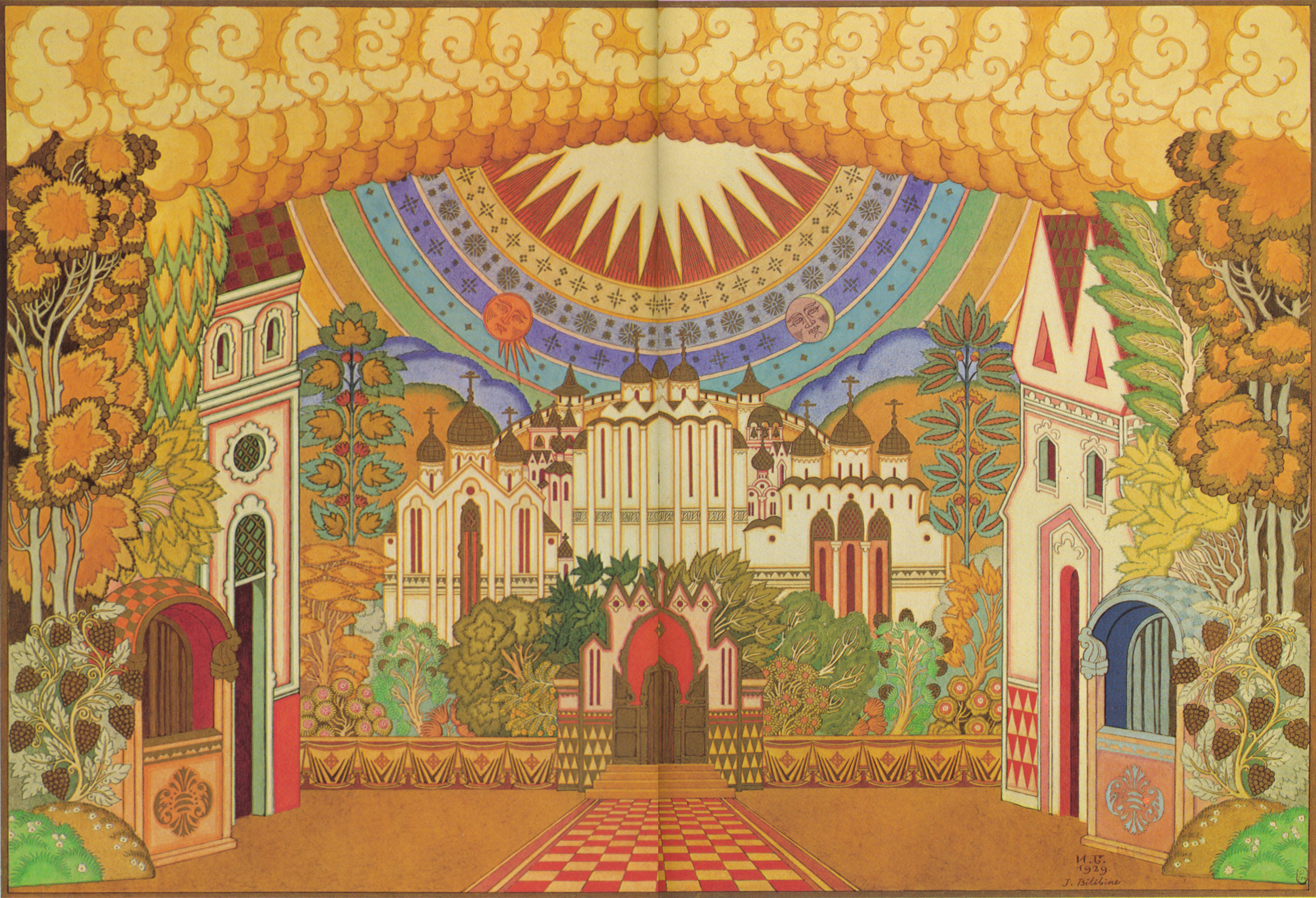
Ivan Bilibin, Tale of the Lost City of Kitezh and the Maiden Fevronia

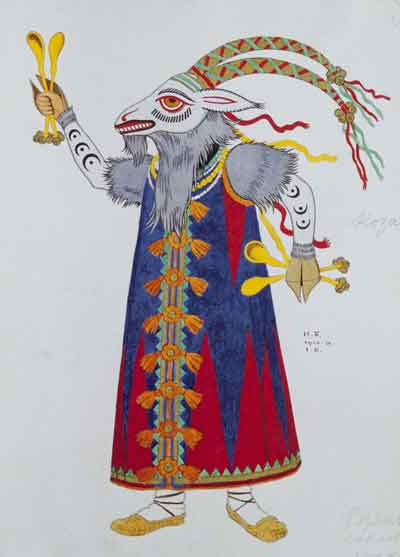
Ivan Bilibin. Costume design for N. A. Rimsky-Korsakov's opera "The Tale of Tsar Saltan"

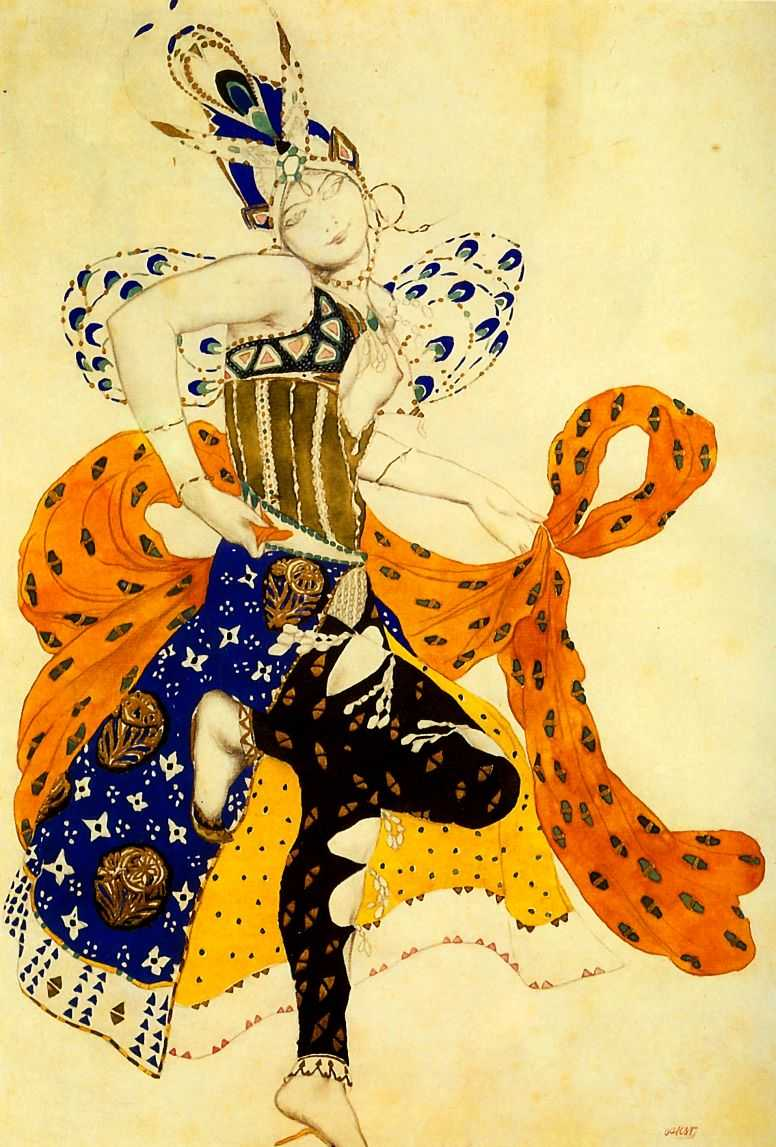
Leon Bakst. Costume design for the ballet "Peri". 1911

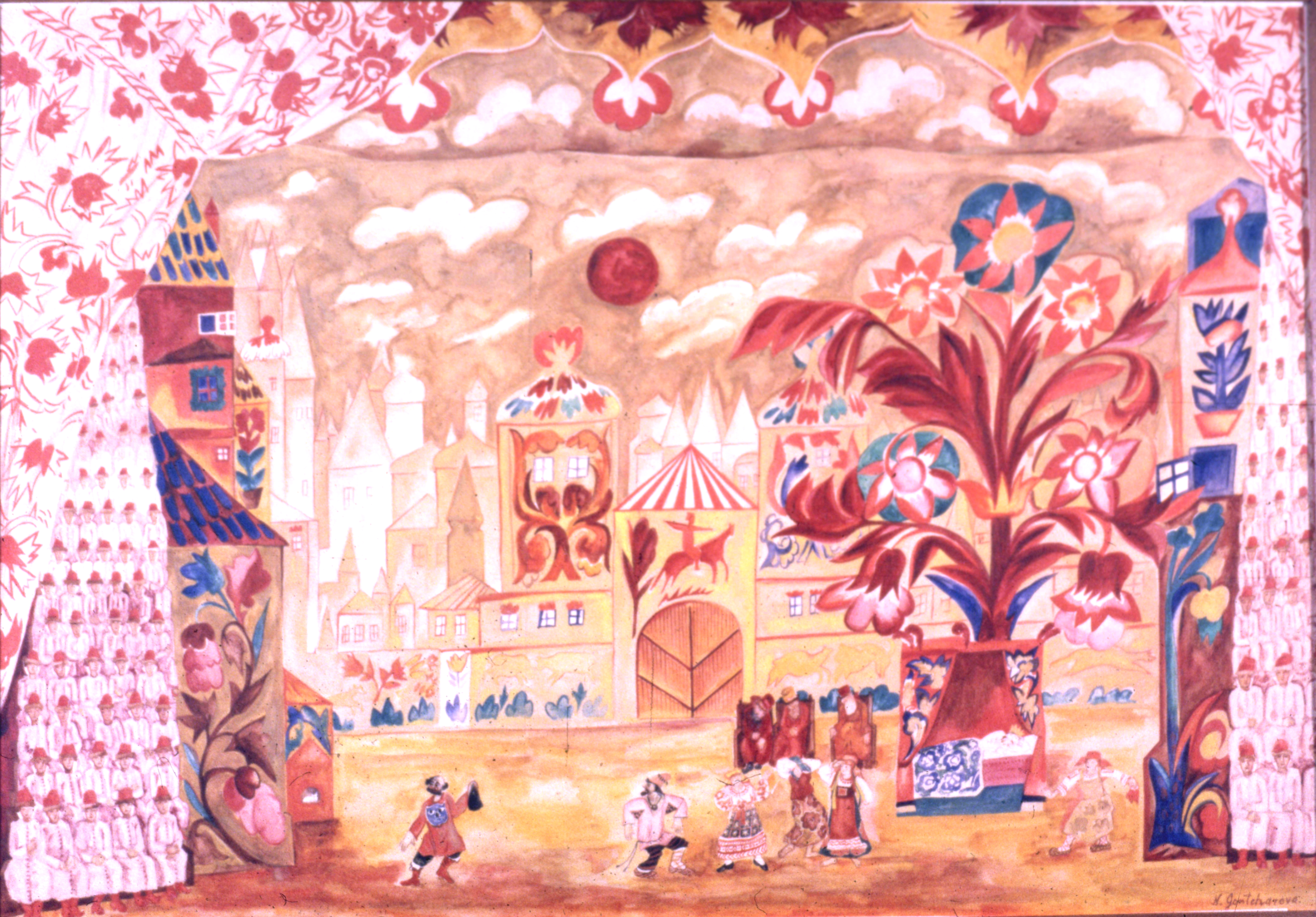
Natalia Goncharova. Set design for N. A. Rimsky-Korsakov's opera The Golden Cockerel. 1914

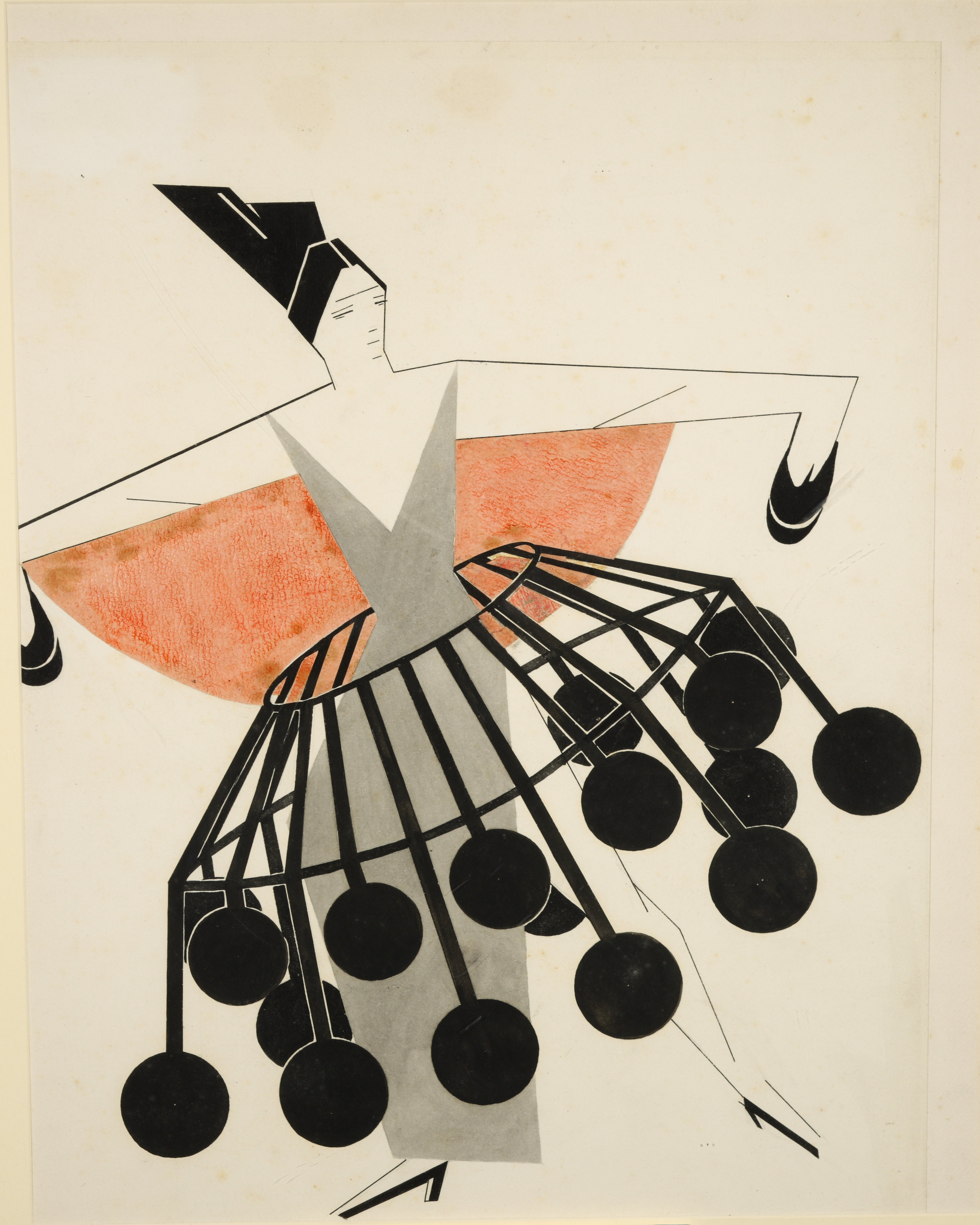
Alexandra Exter. Costume sketch for a woman in a farthingale skirt. 1924.

Gifts and sales

He participated in the creation of the Museum of Private Collections at the Pushkin State Museum of Fine Arts. In 1987, he donated 80 works of Russian graphic art from his collection. A special place among them is occupied by Alexandra Exter's famous series "Theatrical Sets" (1930).

On the eve of the opening of the Museum of Private Collections in 1994, he donated porcelain from the first third of the 20th century to the museum.

In February 2008, he donated the Pushkin State Museum of Fine Arts a painting by the Italian Giorgio de Chirico, "The Poet's Melancholy" (1916), and a watercolor by the Dutch abstractionist Theo van Doesburg, "Black Zigzag" (1924), the subject of which led to the latter's break with Piet Mondrian.

The Marina Tsvetaeva Museum received a gift of "Portrait of Salomea Andronikova" by Alexander Yakovlev.

He donated a detail of a Cossack's head study for the painting "The Zaporozhian Cossacks Writing a Letter to the Turkish Sultan," by Ilya Repin, to the Kyiv Art Gallery National Museum.

Part of the collection (810 graphic sheets) was sold by him on January 24, 2008, to the Konstantinovsky Charitable Foundation for $16 million. An additional 31 sheets were sold to the in July 2010. This charitable foundation states its goal as the reconstruction and recreation of several architectural monuments in St. Petersburg and the Leningrad Region, and was the main investor in the reconstruction of the Konstantinovsky Palace in Strelna (now the state complex "Palace of Congresses"). Currently, this part of the prince's collection is temporarily stored at the St. Petersburg State Museum of Theatre and Musical Art. The Konstantinovsky Foundation plans to move it to the "Star Path" complex, which is being built next to the Constantine Palace. In October 2013, Vladimir Kozhin, Chief of Staff of the Presidential Executive Office, announced that the collection would remain permanently at the Theatre Museum, St. Petersburg where it had been temporarily stored for the past five years.

The remaining portion of the collection (150 works) is owned by the prince's ex-wife, Nina. According to the prince in a 2010 interview. She has concerns about preserving the integrity of our collection." In March 2014, after the Konstantinovsky Foundation transferred the collection to the Theatre Museum, she decided to donate an additional 38 exhibits (from her portion of the collection) to the museum so that the collection could be partially reunited.

The prince's 3,200-volume library and part of his photo archive were donated to the House of Russia Abroad in Moscow in 2010.

He proposed the creation of a National Portrait Gallery in Russia.

In 2015, he donated the sculpture "Unconquered" and the pencil drawing "Dialogue of Two Eras," featuring his portrait with Oksana Karnovich, both works by the artist and sculptor Khizri Asadulaev, to the House of Russia Abroad in Moscow.

In 2017, three paintings out of 15,000 donated by Lobanov-Rostovsky to the Rostov Kremlin Museum-Reserve were allegedly found to be counterfeit. State Duma Deputy A.N. Greshnevikov submitted a parliamentary inquiry to the Investigative Committee regarding the substitution of authentic paintings already at the Rostov Museum. The investigation established that these three paintings never left the Museum for examination in St. Petersburg.[2] Thus, the examination was false.[2] The case was later closed, but Greshnevikov continues to try to reopen it.[2] The work by Giorgio de Chirico, donated to the State Museum of Fine Arts, is also presented in the State Catalogue of the Museum Fund not as an original, but as attributed to this artist and dated to the 20th century.

He gave in 2022 the painting "Preventing the Establishment of Catholicism in Bulgaria, Prince Alexei Borisovich Lobanov-Rostovsky Announces Archimandrite Joseph Sokolsky's Removal from Bulgaria, June 6, 1861" to King Simeon for his Vrana palacae, in Sofia. The painting's author is Valentin Donchevsky, Stara Zagora, Bulgaria (see Bulgarian Greek Catholic Church).

Exhibitions in Russia

Moscow, US Embassy, March 4, 1984 (200 works)

Moscow, Pushkin State Museum of Fine Arts, 1988 (400 works)

Moscow, Pushkin State Museum of Fine Arts, 1994–1995 (350 works)

St. Petersburg, "Return to Russia" for the 100th anniversary of the St. Petersburg Museum of Theatre and Music, September 25–October 26, 2008

St. Petersburg, Chaliapin House, Open Collections project, April 28–October 28, 2010

Saratov, Radishchev Museum, December 9, 2010–January 31, 2011 (240 works)

House Museum

On September 2, 2001, by decree of the Moscow Government, the Princes Lobanov-Rostovsky Memorial House Museum opened in the "City of Masters" on the grounds of the Fili Culture and Recreation Park. Nikita Dmitrievich was appointed as the house museum's curator.

== Family ==
- His first wife (1962–2000) was Nina Georges-Picot (Nina Vilgelmovna Lobanova-Rostovskaya). Nina was the daughter of the French ambassador to the UN, then UN Under-Secretary-General for Economic Affairs and Chairman of the UN Security Council, who had previously (in 1930) served as Second Secretary at the French Embassy in Moscow. Nina is the author of the book "Soviet Porcelain 1917–1927" (London, 1990).
- His second wife, June Marsham-Townsend, is English and a descendant of Lord Sidney (since 2001)

No children.

== Awards and titles ==
- The Highest Order of the Republic of Crimea "For Loyalty to Duty"(10.02.2026)
- Honorary award of the International Council of Russian Compatriots and the Government of Moscow "Compatriot of the Year" (2003) - for contribution to Russian culture and art
- Medal "In Memory of the 300th Anniversary of St. Petersburg" (October 20, 2004)
- Order of Friendship - for significant contribution to the preservation of Russian art, strengthening and developing Russian-British relations in the field of culture (December 29, 2005)
- Certificate of Honor of the Government Commission for Compatriots Abroad (2008)
- Gratitude from the Mayor of Moscow (October 19, 2007) — for significant contribution to developing ties with the historical homeland and promoting Russian cultural and spiritual values.
- Bulgarian Golden Muse Award — for contribution to Russian-Bulgarian cultural ties (2009)
- Citizenship of the Russian Federation — for special services to the Fatherland (November 5, 2010)
- Compatriot of the Year (2012)
- Russian Ludwig Nobel Prize (2013)
- Honorary Doctorate of the St. Petersburg Academy of Arts (2003)
- Full Member of the Petrovskaya Academy of Sciences and Arts (2008)
- Honorary Member of the Russian Academy of Arts (2016)

== Literature ==
- John E. Bowlt. N. D. Lobanov-Rostovsky. Katalog-rezone Khudozhniki Russkogo Teatra / Catalogue-raisonné: Painters of Russian Theatre, 1880–1930. Collection of Nikita and Nina Lobanov-Rostovsky (In Russian, 156 colour and 1026 b/w illustrations.) 1994. 528 pp. ISBN 5-210-00233-0, ISBN 978-5-210-00233-4

N.D.Lobanov-Rostovsky's books:

- Notes of a Collector. Moscow, RAS, 2003
- Era. Fate. Collection. Moscow, Russian Path, 2010
- Rurikovich in Exile. Moscow, author's edition, 2015
- Rurikovich in the 21st Century. Moscow, author's edition, 2017
- Rurikovich at the Turn of the Centuries M., Minuvshee, 2020
- The Life and Times of the Sinful Prince Nikita. Sofia, Lito Balkan, 2022
- Rurikovich: Strips of the Past. M., YASK Publishing House, 2023

Co-authored with:

- J. Bowlt (John Bowlt): Artists of the Russian Theatre. Collection of Nina and Nikita Lobanov-Rostovsky. Vol. 1. Moscow, Iskusstvo, 1990
- J. Bowlt (John Bowlt): Artists of the Russian Theatre. Collection of Nina and Nikita Lobanov-Rostovsky. Catalogue-Répertoire. Vol. 2. M, Iskusstvo, 1994
- Andrey Marudenko: Dialogues. Moscow, Aurora Nobilis, 2020
- Ekaterina Fedorova: Hero of the French Liberation, Russian nobleman N. V. Vyrubov, Moscow, YASK Publishing House, 2021
- Ekaterina Fedorova: Prince Alexei Borisovich Lobanov-Rostovsky is the blacksmith of foreign policy. Diplomat, Minister of Foreign Affairs, genealogist, historian, collector. Moscow, YASK Publishing House, 2022
- Ekaterina Fedorova: Grigory Nikolaevich Vyrubov: Russian positivist philosopher in the European context. Memoirs. Moscow, YASK Publishing House, 2024
- Ekaterina Fedorova: Historical Portrait and the Silver Age: the Family and Collection of Prince N. D. Lobanov-Rostovsky, Moscow, YASK Publishing House, 2021
- Lobanov-Rostovsky, N. Fedorova, E. Artistic directions in Russian painting and their reflections on the stage (1880-1930). Exhibition from the collection of Nikita Dmitrievich Lobanov-Rostovsky. Catalogue. Sofia, 2025. (bilingual edition: Russian and Bulgarian) [author of the concept: N. D. Lobanov-Rostovsky, honorary academician of the Russian Academy of Arts, is. S. Fedorova, PhD in Cultural Studies, Prof. the "M" M. V. Lomonosov", curator Prof. A. Zhurova, artist, C. Ostojic. The exhibition opened on 5 June 2025., at the Russian Cultural Center in Sofia, STR. Rose hips 34.]

Books about N. D. Lobanov-Rostovsky:

- Alexander Gorbovsky. Nikita's Childhood, M., edition by N.D. Lobanov-Rostovsky, 2004
- Edward Gurvich. Bold parallels. The life and fate of an emigrant, M., Man, 2012
- Nikola Filipov. Are you a scout, Prince Nikita Lobanov-Rostovsky. Trans. By Ekaterina Fedorova. Sofia, Because of St. Kliment Ohridsky, 2020
- Sergey Galani. A successful escape. Author's edition, Sofia, 2022
- Lydia Dovydenko. To give to Russia. My meetings with N. D. Lobanov-Rostovsky. The Golden Feather of Russia Library (2016), Moscow, Publishing House of the Zhukovsky Academy, 2022
- Ekaterina Fedorova. About beauty and honor. Biography of Prince Nikita Dmitrievich Lobanov, a descendant of Rurik-Rostovsky, Moscow, YASK Publishing House, 2023

Books in English in collaboration with:

- J. Bowlt (John Boult). Masterpieces of Russian Stage Design. Woodbridge, Suff olk, "Antique Collectors' Club" [Album], 2012
- J. Bowlt (John Boult). Encyclopaedia of Russian Stage Design. Woodbridge, Suff olk, "Antique Collectors' Club" [Catalogue-reason], 2013

Books in Bulgarian about N. D. Lobanov-Rostovsky:

- Nikola Filipov. Whose spy is Prince Nikita Lobanov-Rostovsky? Sofia, publishing house St. Kliment Ohridski, 2019
- Sergei Galani. Successful escape. Per. with Russian Nikola Kazan. Sofia, publishing house St. Cyril and Methodius, 2022

N. D. Lobanov-Rostovsky — sponsor and publisher of publications:

- Princess V. D. Lobanova-Rostovskaya. About the Russian tragedy of the XX century: Before and after 1917. Mother's memories. 1903 — St. Petersburg, 1937 — Sofia. In two books. Volumes I–II. Moscow, The Past, 2018
- Princess V. D. Lobanova-Rostovskaya. About the Russian tragedy of the XX century: Before and after 1917. Mother's memories. 1903 — St. Petersburg, 1937 — Sofia. In two books. Volumes I–II. 2nd edition, revised and expanded. Moscow, Last, 2020

Sponsor book:

- Oleg Barabanov. Grimaldi on the Black Sea. The government of the Grimaldi family of Terratoria Krmatma in Apostille-Apostille VV. Simferopol, Sonata, 2016
- Milena Boykova. Fifty women in Bulgarian painting. Sofia. Lito Balkan, 2020
- Painting with wool and Silk Flanders and France, Ferdinando century. Painting with wool and silk Flanders and France, 16th – 18th centuries. From the National Gallery Collection. From the collection of the National Gallery. National Gallery. Sofia, Square 500, 2025
