= Shakhovskoy =

Russian princely family

- Princely arms of the Shakhovskoy family
- Parent house
- Country: Russian Empire
- Current head: Prince Ivan Dmitrievitch Shakhovskoy (b. 1969)
- Titles: Prince Shakhovskoy
- Style: "Highness"

The House of Shakhovskoy (Note: Alternately written Shahovskoy or Shahovskoi.Ukrainian: Шаховський, Russian: Шаховской, French: Chakhovskoï, German: Schachowskoi, Italian: Šachovskoj.) is the name of a noble family of the Russian Empire which claims descent from Konstantin Glebovich "Shah", a voivode of Nizhny Novgorod in 1481. Most members of the family fled the Russian Empire in 1917 during the Russian Revolution.

In the 19th century, and especially after the abolition of serfdom, the "Shakhovskoy" surname began to appear among peasants who adopted their employers' name, but were not themselves descendants of the princely family.

== Family history ==
The family was founded by Prince Konstantin Glebovich, nicknamed "Shah", a prince of Yaroslavl and son of Gleb Vasilievich. He was the grandson of Vasili Davydovich (died 1345), and his wife Evdokia Ivanovna Moskovskaya (1314–1342), daughter of Ivan I of Moscow. Konstantin Glebovich’s sons, Andrei and Yuri, were the first Shakhovskoy princes.

=== Prince Konstantin Glebovich "Shah" ===
Prince Konstantin was the youngest of three sons of Prince Gleb Vasilievich, whose brother Vasili Vasilievich ruled the Principality of Yaroslavl. The rule was passed down to Vasili's sons.

Nevertheless, Konstantin managed to earn the nickname "Shakh" - from Persian "Shah", meaning king. He eventually moved to the Grand Duchy of Moscow and held service under the high prince. In 1482, Konstantin appears as a voivode in Nizhny Novgorod. His sons, princes Andrei and Yuri, also held their service in Moscow. In the 16th century, the descendants of Andrei split into eight primary branches.

=== After the Russian Revolution ===
Most members of the Shakhovskoy family fled their homeland during the Russian Revolution of 1917. Today, many who bear the name are descendants of peasants who had adopted the surname of their employers. Of the princely family, there are several known descendants in France, in Italy and in other parts of the world, as well as matrilineal descendants in a branch of the Derugin family.

== Coat of arms ==
The first and third sections of the shield are the arms of the Great Duchy of Kiev. The second and fourth sections are the arms of the Principality of Smolensk. In the middle of the arms a smaller shield bears the arms of the Yaroslav Principality.

== Notable family members ==
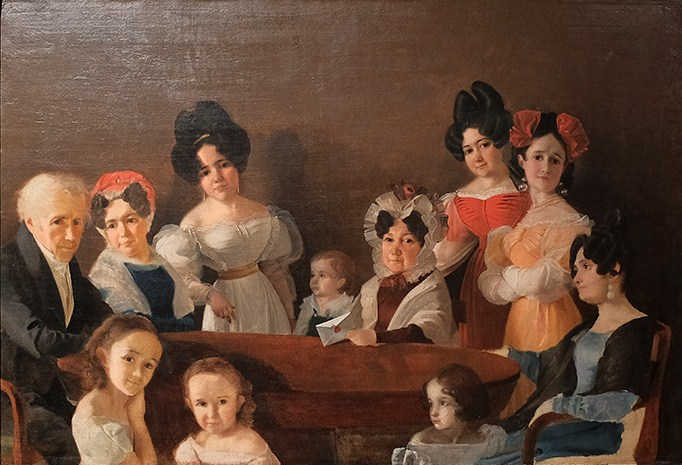
Shakhovskoy family portrait from the early 19th Century

- Prince Fedor Petrovich Shakhovskoy (1796–1829), Decembrist (7th branch). From the marriage of his son Prince Dmitriy Fedorovits Shakhovskoy (1821-1863) to Natalia Borisovna Svjatopolk-Chetvertinsky (1824-1906), Princess Nadezhda Dmitrievna Shakhovskaya (1847–1922) was born.
- Prince Dmitriy Ivanovich Shakhovskoy (1861–1939), liberal politician, minister of the Russian Provisional Government (7th branch)
- Princess Nadezhda Dmitrievna Shakhovskaya (1847–1922), also known as Nadine Helbig. She held an important literary "salotto" in Rome in the Villa Lante al Gianicolo. Married to Wolfgang Helbig, she moved to Italy, where her descendants still reside. With her the surname Shakhovskoy died out in her branch as she was the only heir of the branch.
- Prince Arcadie Septilici-Shakhovskoy – grandmother was Paraschiva Shakhovskoy and grandfather Constantin Septilici governor of Crimeea, who was awarded by Catherine II and Alexander I of Russia.
