= List of tribes and states in Belarus, Russia and Ukraine =

The following is a list of tribes which dwelled and states which existed on the territories of contemporary Belarus, Russia, and Ukraine.

== Overview ==
Clan cultures of the Stone Age and Bronze Age, up to the Late Antiquity period of the tribal societies that were replaced or incorporated into the Early Slavs. The Slavs were a diverse group of tribal societies in the Iron Age and Migration Age Europe whose tribal organizations created the foundations for today's Slavic nations.

The tribes were later replaced or consolidated around Kiev by states containing a mixture of Slavs, Varangians and Finno-Ugric groups, starting with the formation of Kievan Rus'. When Kievan Rus' gradually disintegrated in the 12th and 13th centuries, in part by the Mongol invasion of Kievan Rus', its constituent principalities, known historiographically as "Rus' principalities", asserted their autonomy or sovereignty from Kiev. (Note: "The Rus’ principalities in the fourteenth century were not ‘Russia’, although their history in this century is often subsumed into that rubric. The state centred at Moscow that became Russia emerged from one of the Rus’ principalities over the course of the century. During the 1300s political and cultural diversity was the dominant feature of these lands in the eastern reaches of the forested European plain. (...) What gives this area its historical cohesion was the shared common political heritage of the Kiev Rus' state, whose Rurikide dynasty had controlled most of these lands (not the Baltic littoral or the farthest northern lands) from the tenth to twelfth centuries. By the beginning of the fourteenth, however, the grand principality had evolved into many different principalities, all descended from the Kievan ruling family.") This included semi-autonomous Rus' principalities in the southwest dependent on the Grand Duchy of Lithuania (and later absorbed into Polish–Lithuanian Commonwealth, such as Halych (Galicia) and Volhynia) and in the northeast long dependent on the Golden Horde until around 1500 (including the Novgorod Republic, Vladimir-Suzdal, Smolensk, Polotsk, and Turov, and later Tver, Moscow (Muscovy) and Nizhny Novgorod-Suzdal). In traditional historiography on Belarus, Russia, Ukraine, the impact of Turco-Mongol rule by the Golden Horde and its successor states (traditionally called the "Tatar yoke" or "Mongol yoke") has been neglected or downplayed, with Imperial Russian historiography of the 18th century expressing European superiority over Muslims, nomads, and Asians, of the 19th century expressing racist and colonialist ideologies, and around 1900 expressing Great Russian chauvinism towards minorities. 20th-century Soviet and Western scholars have sought to give a more balanced perspective, but were still influenced by earlier Imperial Russian literature and their own biases.

From around the late 14th century, Muscovy would gradually dominate and absorb the northeastern Kievan Rus' principalities, while competing with Lithuania (and Poland), Novgorod, Tver, and the Teutonic Order for political, socio-economic and cultural control of the entire region. Muscovy became the Tsardom of Russia in 1547, followed by the Russian Empire in 1721, which conquered and annexed the southwestern former Rus' territories from Poland–Lithuania, the Cossack Hetmanate and the Crimean Khanate during the reign of Catherine the Great (r. 1762–1796).

After World War I, the Russian Civil War and the Polish–Soviet War, most of these areas were part of the Soviet Union during the interwar period, except for the western territories that were part of the Second Polish Republic or other states. (Note: The Nowogródek, Polesia, Volhynia, Ternopil and Stanisławów (Ivano-Frankivsk) voivodeships of the Second Polish Republic contained areas that since 1991 have been part of Belarus (such as parts of the former Imperial Russian Minsk Governorate) or Ukraine (the former Imperial Austrian Kingdom of Galicia and Lodomeria and former Imperial Russian Volhynian Governorate). Carpathian Ruthenia (part of Ukraine since 1991) was part of interwar Czechoslovakia, while northern Bukovina (part of Ukraine since 1991) and Bessarabia (divided between Ukraine and Moldova since 1991) were part of the interwar Kingdom of Romania.) During the Cold War, all of Belarus, Russia and Ukraine were part of the Soviet Union as three of its fifteen constituent republics, becoming independent upon its dissolution in 1991.

== List ==
=== Prehistoric period ===
| Name | Period | Type | Notes |
|---|---|---|---|
| Antes people | Protohistoric | Tribe | |
| Arthania | Hypothetical | (unknown) | Hypothetical state whose existence has not been confirmed |
| Bükk culture | Prehistoric | Archaeological culture | |
| Bug–Dniester culture | Prehistoric c. 6300–5000 BCE | Archaeological culture | |
| Catacomb culture | Prehistoric c. 2500–1950 BCE | Archaeological culture | |
| Cernavodă culture | Prehistoric c. 4000–3200 BCE | Archaeological culture | |
| Chernoles culture | Prehistoric | Archaeological culture | |
| Chernyakhov culture | Prehistoric | Archaeological culture | |
| Corded Ware culture | Prehistoric c. 3000–2350 BCE | Archaeological culture | |
| Cucuteni–Trypillia culture | Prehistoric c. 5000–3000 BCE | Archaeological culture | |
| Dnieper–Donets culture | Prehistoric | Archaeological culture | |
| Globular Amphora culture | Prehistoric | Archaeological culture | |
| Khvalynsk culture | Prehistoric | Archaeological culture | |
| Kyiv culture | Prehistoric | Archaeological culture | |
| Korchak culture | Prehistoric | Archaeological culture | |
| Lipiţa culture | Prehistoric | Archaeological culture | |
| Lusatian culture | Prehistoric | Archaeological culture | |
| Mariupol culture | Prehistoric | Archaeological culture | |
| Middle Dnieper culture | Prehistoric | Archaeological culture | |
| Milograd culture | Prehistoric | Archaeological culture | |
| Penkovka culture | Prehistoric | Archaeological culture | |
| Pomeranian culture | Prehistoric | Archaeological culture | |
| Przeworsk culture | Prehistoric | Archaeological culture | |
| Samara culture | Prehistoric | Archaeological culture | |
| Trzciniec culture | Prehistoric | Archaeological culture | |
| Usatove culture | Prehistoric | Archaeological culture | |
| Srubna culture | Prehistoric | Archaeological culture | |
| Sredny Stog culture | Prehistoric | Archaeological culture | |
| Yamna culture | Prehistoric | Archaeological culture | |

=== Antiquity ===
| Name | Period | Type | Notes |
|---|---|---|---|
| Bosporan Kingdom | c. 438 BCE – c. 527 CE | Kingdom | Hellenistic Greek state in parts of Crimea, southern Ukraine and Southern Russia. Fate uncertain, but attacked by Huns, Goths and finally the Byzantine Empire. |
| Goths | Protohistoric c. 2nd century–4th century | Tribal confederation | Germanic tribal grouping which migrated to Oium in Scythia (modern Ukraine) in the 2nd century, and went on to raid and conquer parts of the Roman Empire. It is uncertain whether the Crimean Goths (and the Crimean Gothic language) descended from them, or from a later Germanic influx. |
| Greeks in pre-Roman Crimea | c. 600–50 BCE | Greek colonies | Panticapaeum, Chersonesus, and other colonies. |
| Kingdom of Pontus | 281 BCE–62 CE | Kingdom | Hellenistic Greek kingdom around the Black Sea. |
| Scythia | Protohistoric c. 7th–3rd century BCE | Kingdom | Successor to Iškuza. |
| Scythians | Protohistoric c. 7th–3rd century BCE | Tribe | Nomadic Iranian equestrian people. Migrated from Central Asia to modern Ukraine and Southern Russia. |
| Scytho-Siberian world | Protohistoric c. 900 BCE–200 CE | Archaeological horizon | Includes the Sarmatians. |

=== Middle Ages ===
| Name | Period | Type | Notes |
|---|---|---|---|
| Astrakhan Khanate | –1556 | Khanate | To Tsardom of Russia in 1556. |
| Principality of Beloozero | 1238–1485 | Principality | To Moscow in 1485. |
| Principality of Belyov | –1407 | Principality | To Lithuania in 1407. |
| Principality of Chernigov (Chernihiv) | 1024–1406 | Principality | Established as appanage of Kievan Rus'. To Lithuania in 1406. |
| Cumania (Cuman–Kipchak confederation) | c. 10th century–1241 | Tribal confederation | Evolved out of Kimek–Kipchak confederation. To Golden Horde in 1241. |
| Dregovichs | Protohistoric | Tribe | |
| Drevlyans (Derevlians) | Protohistoric; 6th–10th century | Tribe | Consolidated into Kievan Rus' |
| Principality of Drutsk | 1101–1565 | Principality | Established as appanage of the Principality of Polotsk. To Lithuania in 14th century. |
| Dulebes | Protohistoric | Tribe | |
| Kingdom of Galicia–Volhynia (Ruthenia) | 1198–1349 | Principality (1198–1253); Kingdom (1253–1349) | Formed by the union of the principalities of Halych and Volhynia. To Grand Duchy of Lithuania, to Kingdom of Poland in 1349. |
| Great Horde (Uluğ Orda) | c. 15th century–1502 | Khanate | Rump state of the Golden Horde. To Crimean Khanate in 1502. |
| Golden Horde (Ulug Ulus) | 1243–1502 | Khanate | Established during the Mongol invasion of Kievan Rus'. Evolved into the Great Horde. |
| Principality of Great Perm | 1323–1505 | Principality | To Moscow in 1505. |
| Principality of Grodno | 1117–1315 | Principality | To Lithuania in 1315. |
| Principality of Halych | 1124–1198 | Principality | Established as appanage of Principality of Terebovlia. Merged into Principality (later Kingdom) of Galicia–Volhynia (Ruthenia). |
| Principality of Jersika | 1203– | Principality | |
| Kashubians | Protohistoric; 13th–15th century | Tribe | Consolidated into the Duchy of Pomerania |
| Kazan Khanate | –1552 | Khanate | To Tsardom of Russia in 1552. |
| Khazaria | c. 650–969 | Khanate | Reportedly converted to Judaism. Defeated by Kievan Rus'. |
| Kievan Rus' (Kyivan Rus') | c. 9th–13th century | Grand principality | First confirmed Slav-dominated state in Eastern Europe consolidating several Slavic and Finno-Ugric tribes and Norse Varangians (Rus' people). Evolved into an amalgam of Rus' principalities (see also Council of Liubech), then disintegrated. |
| Principality of Kiev (Kyiv) | 1132–1240 | Principality | Evolved from Kievan Rus'. Sacked by Mongols in 1240. To Lithuania 1362. |
| Kimek–Kipchak confederation | c. 880–1200 | Tribal confederation | Transformed into the Cuman–Kipchak confederation. |
| Principality of Koknese | c. 1180s–1206 | Principality | |
| Principality of Kolomna | 1165– | Principality | |
| Principality of Kozelsk | since 1235 | Principality | |
| Krivichs | Protohistoric | Tribal confederation | |
| Principality of Kursk | since 1195 | Principality | |
| Kuyaba | Hypothetical c. 10th century | (unknown) | Hypothetical state whose existence has not been confirmed. Might be the same as Kievan Rus'. |
| Kyi dynasty | Hypothetical unknown | Principality | A hypothetical state preceding Kievan Rus' whose existence has not been confirmed. |
| Lechites | Protohistoric | Linguistic grouping | Fragmented into tribes "Lechites" are a modern scholarly linguistic subdivision of early medieval West Slavs |
| Grand Duchy of Lithuania | c. 1236–1569 | Grand duchy | Until Union of Lublin in 1569, afterwards see Polish–Lithuanian Commonwealth. |
| Principality of Mezetsk | –1504 | Principality | To Moscow in 1504. |
| Principality of Minsk | 1070–1326 | Principality | Since 1070. To Lithuania in 1326. |
| Principality of Mosalsk | | Principality | (to Moscow at 1494) |
| Principality of Moscow (Grand Duchy of Moscow; Muscovy) | c. 13th century–1547 | Principality | Since 1276; since 1330 Grand Duchy. Became Tsardom of Russia in 1547, Russian Empire in 1721. |
| Principality of Murom | | Principality | (since 1127) (to Moscow at 1393) |
| Novgorod Republic | 1136–1478 | Republic | Originally a princely appanage of Kievan Rus', Novgorod evolved a republican system in the 11th century. Conquered and annexed by Muscovy in 1478. |
| Principality of Novgorod-Seversk (Novhorod-Siverskiy) | c. 12th century–1356 | Principality | Personal union with Chernigov; to Lithuania in 1356 |
| Novgorod Slavs (Ilmen Slavs) | Protohistoric; 8th–10th century | Tribe | Consolidated into the Novgorod Republic |
| Novosilsky principality | | Principality | (to Lithuania at 1425) |
| Obotrites | Protohistoric c. 8th century–1167 | Tribal confederation | Consolidated into the House of Mecklenburg |
| Old Prussians | c. 9th century–1274 | Tribe | Baltic tribe dwelling in East Prussia (partially in modern Kaliningrad Oblast, part of the Russian Federation since 1991). Subdued by the Teutonic Order during the Prussian Crusade (1217–1274). |
| Pechenegs | Protohistoric c. 860–1122 | Tribes, khanates | |
| Principality of Peremyshl | | Principality | To Grand Duchy of Galicia-Volhynia, later incorporated to Kingdom of Poland. |
| Principality of Pereyaslavl | c. 11th century–1239 | Principality | Established as appanage of Kievan Rus'. Destroyed by the Mongols in 1239. |
| Polabian Slavs | Protohistoric | Tribe | |
| Polans (eastern) | Protohistoric | Tribe | |
| Principality of Polotsk (Polatsk) | c. 10th century–1307 | Principality | Purportedly evolved from tribal union of Krivichs. Vassal state of Kievan Rus' since c. 1000. To Lithuania at 1307. |
| Principality of Pronsk | 1129– | Principality | |
| Pskov Republic | c. 1200–1510 | Republic | Originally a Rus' principality, Pskov evolved a republican system around 1200. To Moscow in 1510. |
| Principality of Putyvl | 1150– | Principality | |
| Radimichs | Protohistoric | Tribe | |
| Principality of Rostov | 1207–1474 | Principality | Since 1207. To Moscow in 1474. |
| Rus' Khaganate | Hypothetical c. 839–882 | Khanate | A hypothetical state preceding Kievan Rus' whose existence has not been confirmed. |
| Principality of Rylsk | | Principality | (since 1152) |
| Principality of Ryazan (Riazan) | | Principality | (to Moscow in 1521) |
| Sclaveni or Sclaviniae | Protohistoric | Tribe | |
| Severians | Protohistoric | Tribe | |
| Principality of Smolensk | | Principality | (to Lithuania at 1404) |
| Principality of Starodub | | Principality | (to Lithuania at 1406) |
| Principality of Suzdal—Nizhny Novgorod | | Principality | (since 1341)(to Moscow at 1425) |
| Principality of Tarusa | | Principality | (to Moscow at 1395) |
| Principality of Terebovlia | 1084–1141 | Principality | Established as appanage of Kievan Rus'. Incorporated into Principality of Halych. |
| State of the Teutonic Order | 1226–1561 | Elective monarchy Theocracy | German Crusader state in the Baltic region and East Prussia based in Königsberg (modern Kaliningrad Oblast, since 1991 part of the Russian Federation). |
| Tivertsi | Protohistoric | Tribe | |
| Principality of Tmutarakan | | Principality | (destroyed by Cumans at 1097) |
| Principality of Toropets | | Principality | (since 1126; personal union with Smolensk; to Lithuania at 1362) |
| Principality of Turov and Pinsk | | Principality | (to Lithuania at 1336) |
| Empire of Trebizond | 1204–1461 | Empire | Controlled parts of Crimea (the former Cherson (theme)) and Kuban. |
| Principality of Trubetsk | | Principality | (since 1357)(to Russia at 1566) |
| Principality of Tver | | Principality | (since 1246) (to Moscow at 1485) |
| Principality of Uglich | | Principality | (since 1216) |
| Ulichs | Protohistoric | Tribe | |
| Veleti | Protohistoric | Tribe | |
| Vistula Veneti | Protohistoric | Tribe | |
| Principality of Vitebsk | | Principality | (since 1101; to Lithuania at 1320) |
| Vladimir-Suzdal (Vladimir, Vladimir-Sudzalia) | 1157–c. 14th century | Principality/duchy; Grand duchy/principality | Emerged out of Principality of Rostov. Since 1157 Principality/Duchy of Vladimir-Suzdal. After sacking Kiev in 1169, it claimed to be a grand principality/duchy. In the 14th century, Vladimir-Suzdal had splintered into various appanage principalities including Nizhny Novgorod (Novogord-Suzdal), Tver and Moscow (Muscovy) who all claimed the title of Grand Prince of Vladimir, and sought to gain the favour of the Tatar-Mongol khan of the Golden Horde to secure it. (Note: During the 14th century, "political history is dominated by the vicious struggle between Moscow and Tver' for supremacy in Vladimir-Suzdalia. In the drive for power, both states had to address Sarai, for the Golden Horde had the uncontested prerogative of determining succession to the symbolic throne of the grand prince of Vladimir. In this new political climate, the Mongols abandoned the now obsolete policy of respecting the traditional Russian lines of succession.") In the early 14th century, the khan awarded the title to Yury of Moscow to counterbalance the strength of Tver; and after the Tver Uprising of 1327, which the Muscovites helped put down, Özbeg Khan named Ivan "Kalita" of Moscow the new grand prince of Vladimir. By the mid-14th century and especially during the 1360s "Great Troubles" for the Golden Horde, the khan's alliance with Moscow made the latter militarily and administratively powerful enough to economically and demographically devastate its rivals, notably Tver. The khans therefore started awarding the grand princely title to Moscow's rivals; in 1353, Konstantin Vasilyevich of Nizhny Novgorod-Suzdal was given the title of grand prince of Vladimir, and in 1371 it was Mikhail II of Tver. But by that time it was too late for the Golden Horde to curb the rise of Muscovy. |
| Volga Bulgaria | late 9th century–1240s | Khanate, Emirate | Destroyed by Mongol invasion. |
| Principality of Volhynia (Volodymyr) | 987–1198 | Principality | Established as appanage of Kievan Rus'. Merged into Principality (later Kingdom) of Galicia–Volhynia (Ruthenia). |
| Principality of Vorotynsk | | Principality | (to Lithuania at 1407) |
| Principality of Vshchizh | | Principality | (since 1156) |
| Vyatichs | Protohistoric | Tribe | |
| Vyatka Land | Protohistoric c. 11th–1489 | Tribal society | Originally inhabited by Permians, settled by Rus' people. To Moscow in 1489. |
| Western Turkic Khaganate | 581–742 | Khanate | |
| White Croats | Protohistoric c. 6th–20th century | Tribe | Migrated to Croatia or assimilated with other Slavs |
| Principality of Yaroslavl | | Principality | (since 1218)(to Moscow at 1471) |

=== Early modern period ===
| Name | Period | Type | Notes |
|---|---|---|---|
| Cossack Hetmanate (Zaporizhian Host) | 1649–1764 | Elective monarchy (Hetmanate) | Broke away from the Polish–Lithuanian Commonwealth. Had an autonomous Zaporozhian Sich within it. Changed alliance/vassalage several times between Poland–Lithuania, the Crimean Khanate/Ottoman Empire, and the Tsardom of Russia. Annexed by the Russian Empire in 1764. |
| Crimean Khanate | 1441–1783 | Khanate | Evolved out of the Golden Horde. To Russian Empire in 1783. |
| Kazakh Khanate | | Khanate | To Russian Empire in 1847. |
| Khanate of Khiva | | Khanate | Russian protectorate since 1873. |
| Khanate of Kokand | –1883 | Khanate | To Russian Empire in 1883. |
| Nogai Horde | | Khanate | (to Russia at 1634) |
| Polish–Lithuanian Commonwealth | 1569–1795 | Elective monarchy | Established by Union of Lublin (1569) between Kingdom of Poland and Grand Duchy of Lithuania. |
| Duchy of Prussia (Brandenburg-Prussia) | 1525–1701 | Duchy | Reorganisation of the State of the Teutonic Order. Based in Königsberg (modern Kaliningrad, Kaliningrad Oblast, part of the Russian Federation since 1991), in personal union with Electoral Brandenburg (based in Berlin) since 1618. Became the Kingdom of Prussia in 1701. |
| Qasim Khanate | –1681 | Khanate | To Russia in 1681. |
| Khanate of Sibir | | Khanate | To Russia in 1598. Origin of the name "Siberia". |
| Qing dynasty | Until 1858/60 | Empire | Outer Manchuria was part of the Chinese Empire under the Qing until the 1858/60 Amur Annexation to the Russian Empire. Thereafter known as Green Ukraine. |
| Zaporozhian Sich (Free lands of the Zaporozhian Host the Lower) | 1552–1775 | Republic; Proto-state | Stratocratic Cossack proto-state. Within the Polish–Lithuanian Commonwealth, the Cossack Hetmanate, and the Russian Empire, it functioned as an autonomous polity until annexed by the last in 1775. |

=== 19th century ===
| Name | Period | Type | Notes |
|---|---|---|---|
| German Empire | 1871–1918 | Constitutional monarchy | Unification of German monarchies under leadership of the Kingdom of Prussia (including modern Kaliningrad Oblast, part of the Russian Federation since 1991). Transformed into the Weimar Republic after World War I. |
| Kingdom of Prussia | 1701–1918 | Absolute monarchy (1701–1848); Constitutional monarchy (1848–1918) | Successor to the Duchy of Prussia. Capital at Berlin, coronation at Königsberg (capital of East Prussia province). Joined the German Empire as its dominant member state in 1871. Abolished in 1947; Kaliningrad Oblast created and transferred to Soviet Russia under the 1945 Potsdam Agreement. |
| Kingdom of Romania | 1881–1947 | Constitutional monarchy (1881–1937); Various dictatorships (1937–1947) | North Bukovina and south Bessarabia were conquered by royal Romanian forces during World War I, and were part of Romania in the interwar period. The Red Army occupied them in 1944, and the new socialist Romanian People's Republic ceded them to Soviet Ukraine by the Paris Peace Treaties, 1947. They have been part of Ukraine since 1991. |
| Russian Empire | 1721–1917 | Absolute monarchy proclaimed by Tsar Peter I after the Great Northern War. Since 1762 ruled by the Holstein-Gottorp-Romanov dynasty. | |

=== 20th century and modern times ===
| Name | Period | Type | Notes |
|---|---|---|---|
| Republic of Belarus | 1991–present | Republic | Established when the Byelorussian Soviet Socialist Republic proclaimed independence from the Soviet Union in 1991. Joined the Union State with the Russian Federation in 1999. |
| Belarusian Democratic Republic / Belarusian People's Republic (BNR) | 1918–1919 | Republic | Client state of the German Empire (under the military jurisdiction of Ober Ost), received some diplomatic recognition. To Lit-Bel SSR and Second Polish Republic in 1919. As of 2023, its last remaining institution, the Rada of the Belarusian Democratic Republic, is the oldest existing government in exile. |
| Socialist Soviet Republic of Byelorussia | 1919 | Unrecognised state | Established on 1 January 1919 by Bolshevik forces from Soviet Russia during the Lithuanian–Soviet War and Polish–Soviet War. Merged into the Socialist Soviet Republic of Lithuania and Belorussia in February 1919. |
| Byelorussian Soviet Socialist Republic (BSSR) | 1920–1991 | Soviet republic | Evolved from the Socialist Soviet Republic of Lithuania and Belorussia (Lit-Bel). Joined the Soviet Union in 1922. Proclaimed independence in 1991 as Republic of Belarus. |
| First Czechoslovak Republic | 1918–1938 | Republic | Established in the end of World War I out of Austria-Hungary, including Carpathian Ruthenia (since 1991 mostly part of Ukraine). Occupied and partially annexed by Nazi Germany and Hungary in 1938–9, during which Carpatho-Ukraine was an autonomous region within the Second Czechoslovak Republic rump state. |
| Don Republic | 1918–1920 | Unrecognised state | Breakaway revolutionary anti-Soviet republic controlled by the Armed Forces of South Russia. To Soviet Russia in 1920. |
| Hutsul Republic | 1919 | Unrecognised state | Breakaway revolutionary anti-Habsburg republic. To West Ukrainian People's Republic and Czechoslovakia. |
| Kuban People's Republic | 1918–1920 | Republic | Breakaway revolutionary anti-Soviet republic controlled by the Armed Forces of South Russia. Received some diplomatic recognition. To Soviet Russia in 1920. |
| Socialist Soviet Republic of Lithuania and Belorussia (Lit-Bel) | 1919–1920 | Unrecognised state | Merger of the Lithuanian Soviet Socialist Republic and the Socialist Soviet Republic of Belorussia. Subdued the Belarusian Democratic Republic. Defeated and partitioned by the Second Polish Republic, the Republic of Lithuania, and Soviet Russia in 1920. |
| Nazi Germany | 1933–1945 | Totalitarian fascist dictatorship | Established by Adolf Hitler's Nazi Party seizing power in the Weimar Republic (including East Prussia) in 1933. The Nazi regime had extensive plans for creating Lebensraum in Eastern Europe under Generalplan Ost, apart from invading and occupying large swaths of territory from modern Belarus, Russia and Ukraine during Operation Barbarossa (1941), and committing large-scale ethnic cleansing there, only Bialystok District (1941–1945, which included some areas of modern Belarus) was ever formally annexed into the German Reich. Nazi Germany was defeated by the Allies of World War II in 1945; it became Allied-occupied Germany. Under the 1945 Potsdam Agreement, Königsberg and environs were transferred to Soviet Russia, which annexed it as Kaliningrad Oblast. |
| Second Polish Republic | 1918–1939 | Republic | Emerged at the end of World War I as a revolutionary republic in the power vacuum between the defeated Tsarist Russian forces and retreating German Empire. Rather than a multi-ethnic federation (as some including its Chief of State Józef Piłsudski advocated, based on the Polish–Lithuanian Commonwealth), it became a Polish-dominated unitary republic with large Ukrainian, Belarusian, Lithuanian, and German minorities. Nazi Germany and Soviet Union invaded and destroyed it in 1939, starting World War II. |
| Russian Federation | 1991–present | Federal republic | Established when the Russian Soviet Federative Socialist Republic proclaimed independence from the Soviet Union in 1991. Joined the Union State with Belarus in 1999. |
| Russian Republic | 1917–1918 | Provisional government | Petrograd-based. Emerged from the Russian Provisional Government of the February Revolution. To Soviet Russia in 1917. |
| Russian Soviet Federative Socialist Republic (RSFSR, Soviet Russia, Bolshevik Russia) | 1917–1991 | Soviet republic Federal republic | Emerged out of the October Revolution. Revolutionary Bolshevik communist federal Soviet republic, joined the Soviet Union as its dominant member state in 1922. Proclaimed independence in 1991 as Russian Federation. |
| Russian State (1918–1920) | 1918–1920 | Military dictatorship | Omsk-based. Emerged from the Provisional All-Russian Government, controlled by the White Army. To Soviet Russia in 1920. |
| Soviet Union (USSR, Union of Socialist Soviet Republics) | 1922–1991 | Soviet republic Totalitarian dictatorship | Union of 15 Soviet republics which emerged out of the October Revolution, including the Russian Soviet Federative Socialist Republic (RSFSR), the Ukrainian Soviet Socialist Republic (UkrSSR), and the Byelorussian Soviet Socialist Republic (BSSR). During its existence, the Soviet Union was the largest state in the world by territory, and the leading communist power during the Cold War (see also Eastern Bloc and Second World). The dissolution of the Soviet Union occurred in 1988–1991, during which the Russian Federation, Ukraine, and the Republic of Belarus established their independence. |
| Ukraine | 1991–present | Republic | Established when the Ukrainian Soviet Socialist Republic proclaimed independence from the Soviet Union in 1991. Signed the European Union–Ukraine Association Agreement in 2014. |
| Ukrainian People's Republic (UPR, UNR) | 1917–1921 | Republic | Breakaway revolutionary anti-Soviet republic, received some diplomatic recognition. Briefly interrupted by the Ukrainian State. Allied with Second Polish Republic with the Treaty of Warsaw (1920), but defeated by Soviet Russia. Largely to Soviet Ukraine in 1921. |
| Ukrainian People's Republic of Soviets | 1917–1918 | Unrecognised state | Emerged out of the October Revolution. Member state of the Russian Soviet Federative Socialist Republic. Briefly renamed Ukrainian Soviet Republic. To Ukrainian People's Republic in 1918. |
| Ukrainian Soviet Socialist Republic (Soviet Ukraine, UkrSSR) | 1919–1991 | Soviet republic | Established (initially at Kharkov) by Bolshevik forces from Soviet Russia during the Ukrainian–Soviet War. Subdued the Ukrainian People's Republic in 1921. Joined the Soviet Union in 1922. Proclaimed independence in 1991 as Ukraine. |
| Ukrainian State | 1918 | Republic | Client state of the German Empire briefly interrupting the revolutionary Ukrainian People's Republic. |
| Weimar Republic | 1918–1933 | Federal republic | Successor to the abolished German Empire, dominated by the Free State of Prussia (including modern Kaliningrad Oblast, part of the Russian Federation since 1991). Transformed into Nazi Germany when Adolf Hitler's Nazi Party passed the Enabling Act of 1933. |
| West Ukrainian People's Republic | 1918–1919 | Republic | Breakaway revolutionary anti-Habsburg republic, partially recognised. Disputed autonomous region of the Ukrainian People's Republic (1919), then to Poland, Czechoslovakia, and Romania. |

== Gallery ==
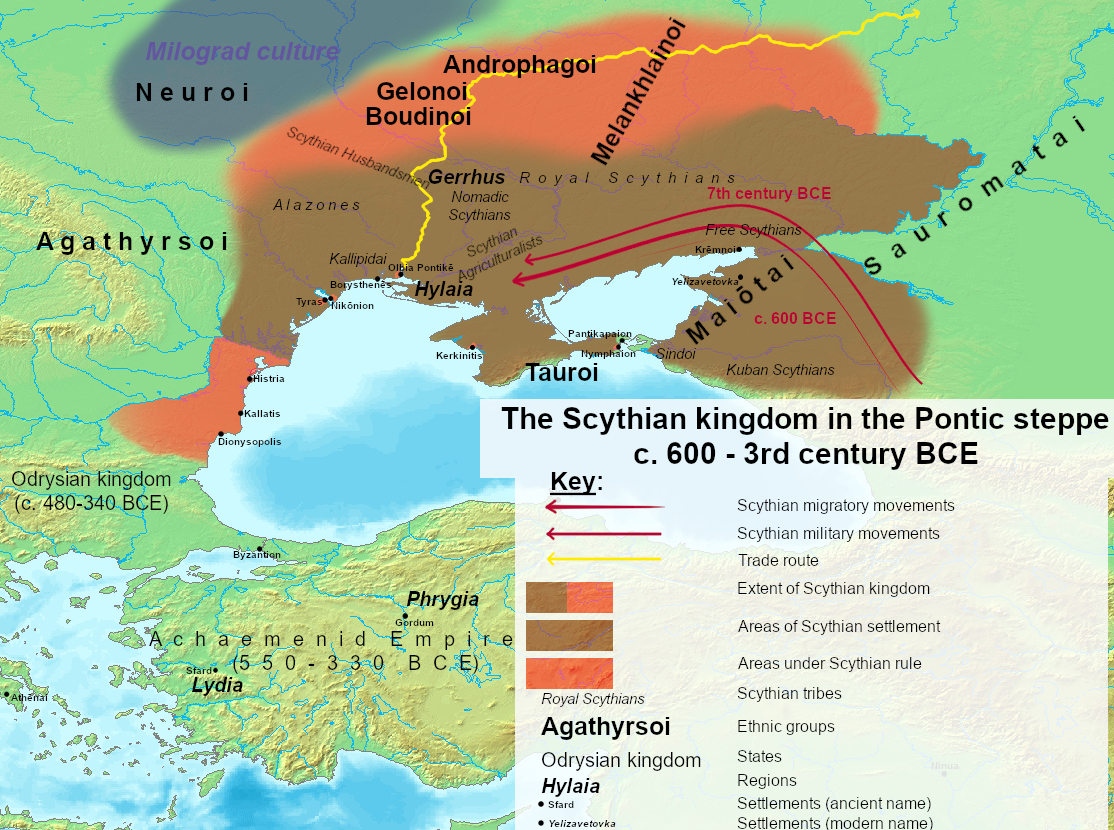
Maximum extent of the Scythian kingdom in the Pontic steppe (c. 600 – c. 250 BCE)

Bosporan Kingdom from 5th century BCE to 1st century CE

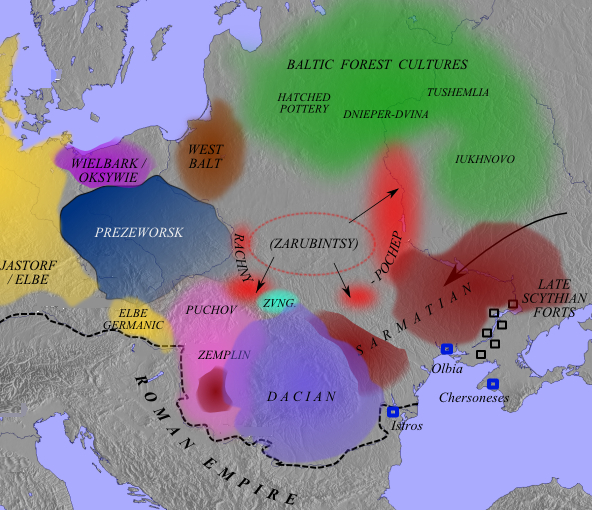
The Roman Empire, tribes and archaeological cultures around 100 CE

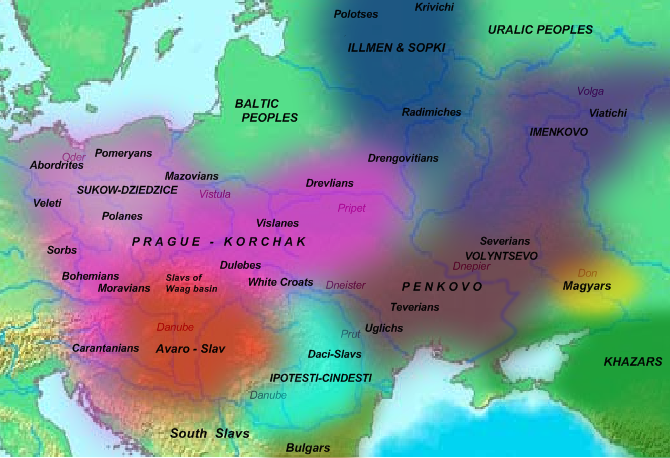
Archaeological cultures and tribes in Eastern Europe around 700

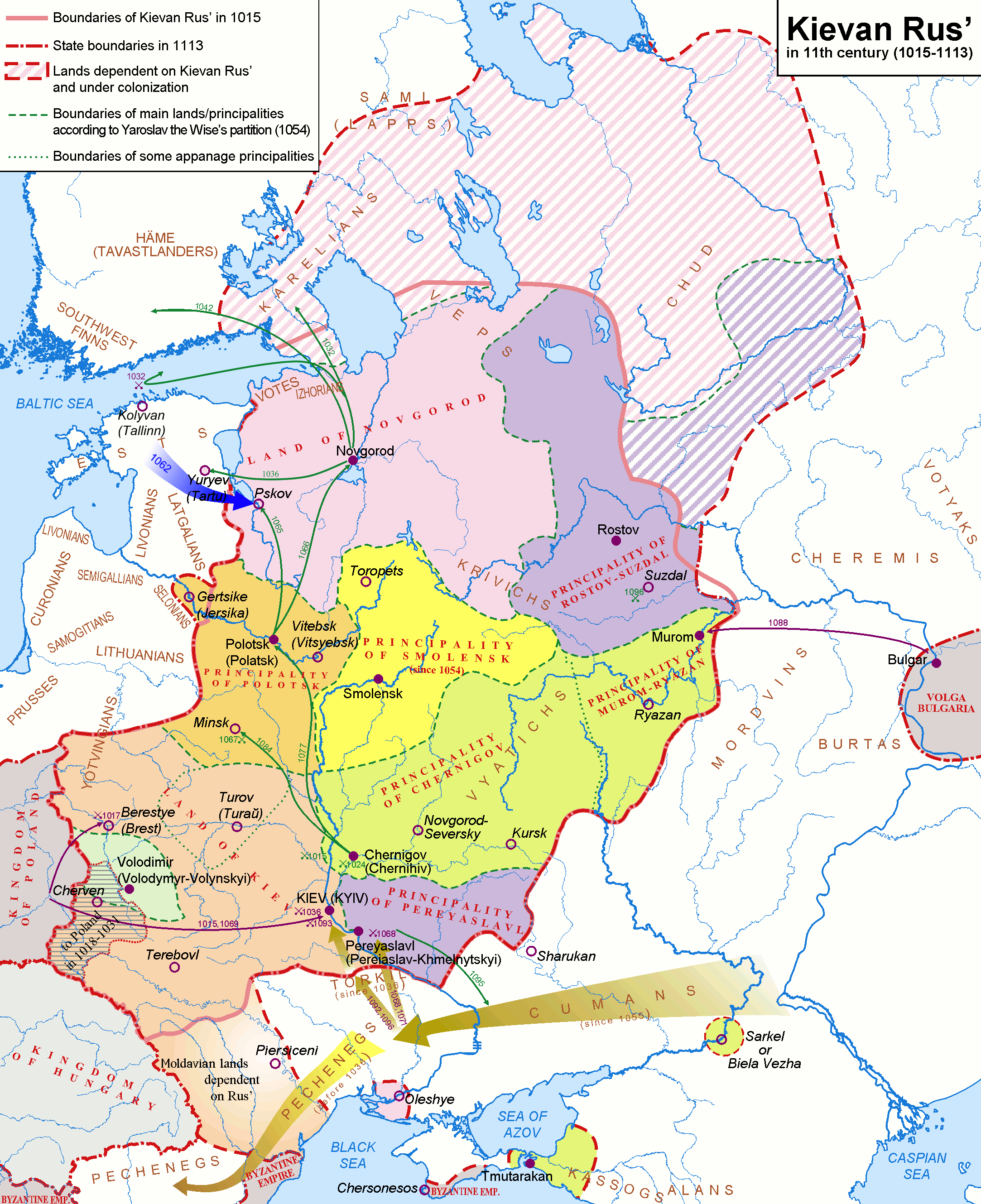
Kievan Rus' around 1100 (Council of Liubech)

Principalities of Kievan Rus' (1054–1132)

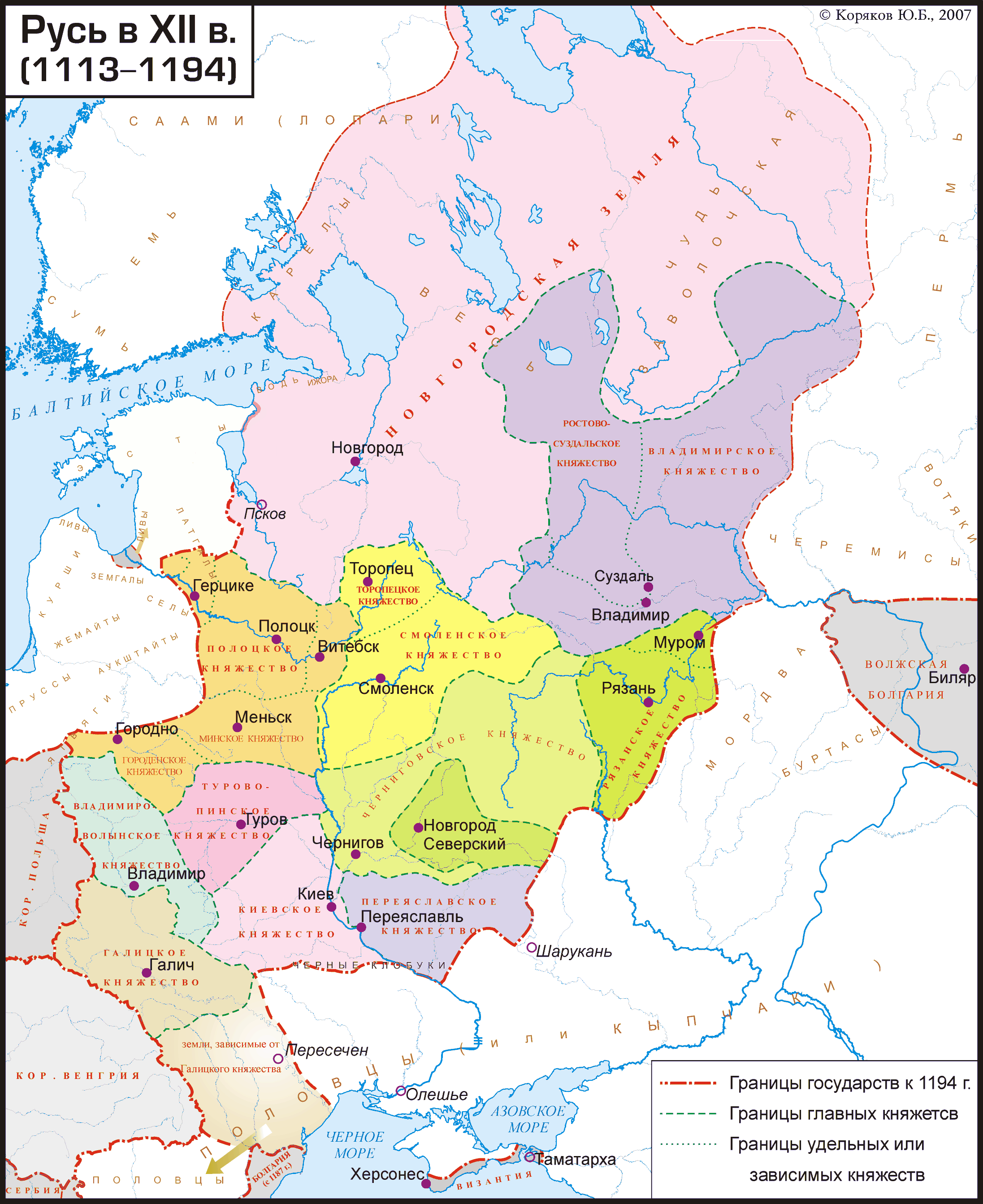
Kievan Rus' between 1113 and 1194

Expansion of the Mongol Empire 1206–1294 compared to modern borders

Mongol raids into Europe around 1230

Kievan Rus' in 1237, on the eve of the Mongol invasion of Kievan Rus'

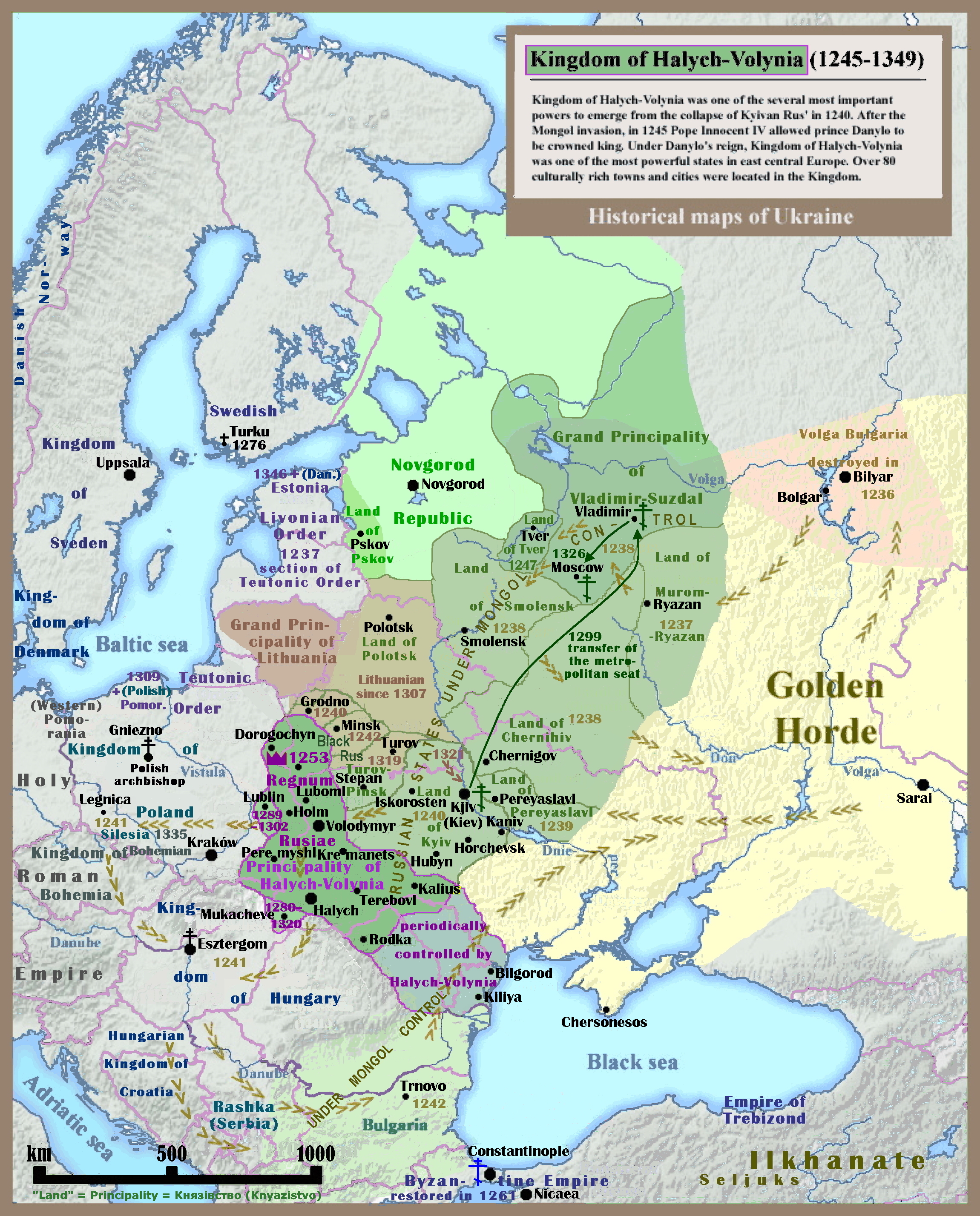
The Golden Horde and Galicia–Volhynia during 1245–1349

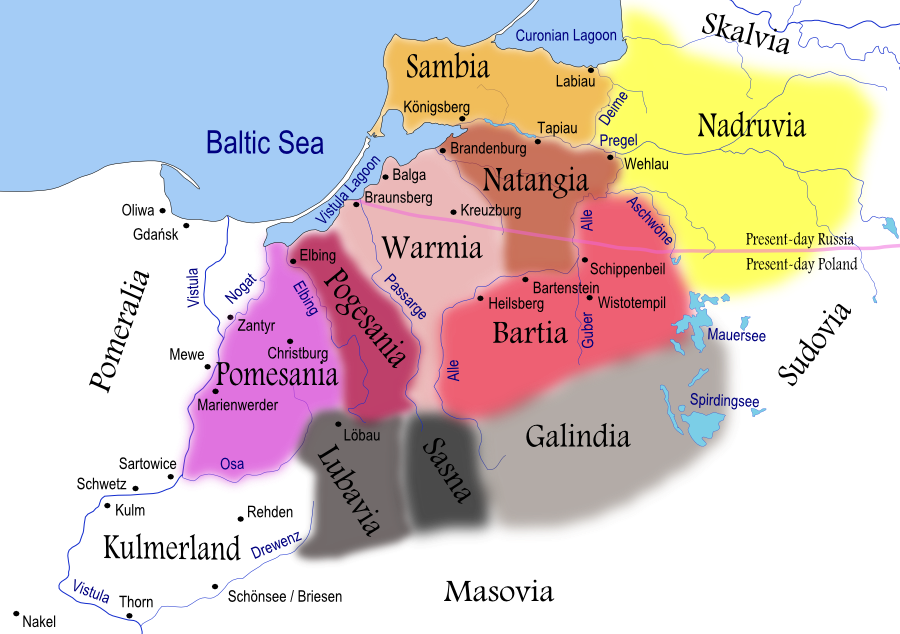
Old Prussian clans in the 13th century (partially in modern Kaliningrad Oblast)

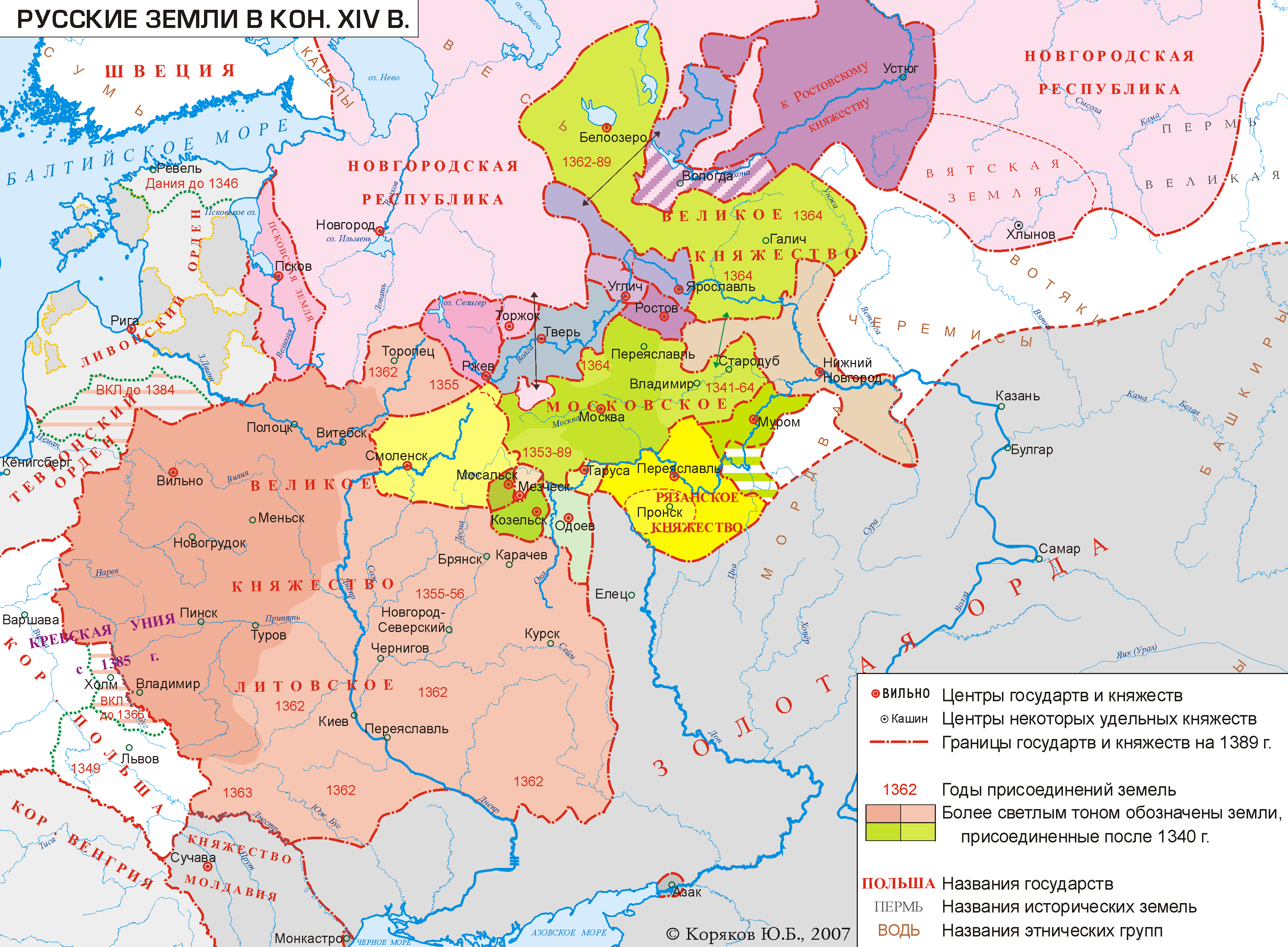
Rus' principalities, Lithuania and the Golden Horde in 1389

Northeastern Rus' principalities in the 14th century

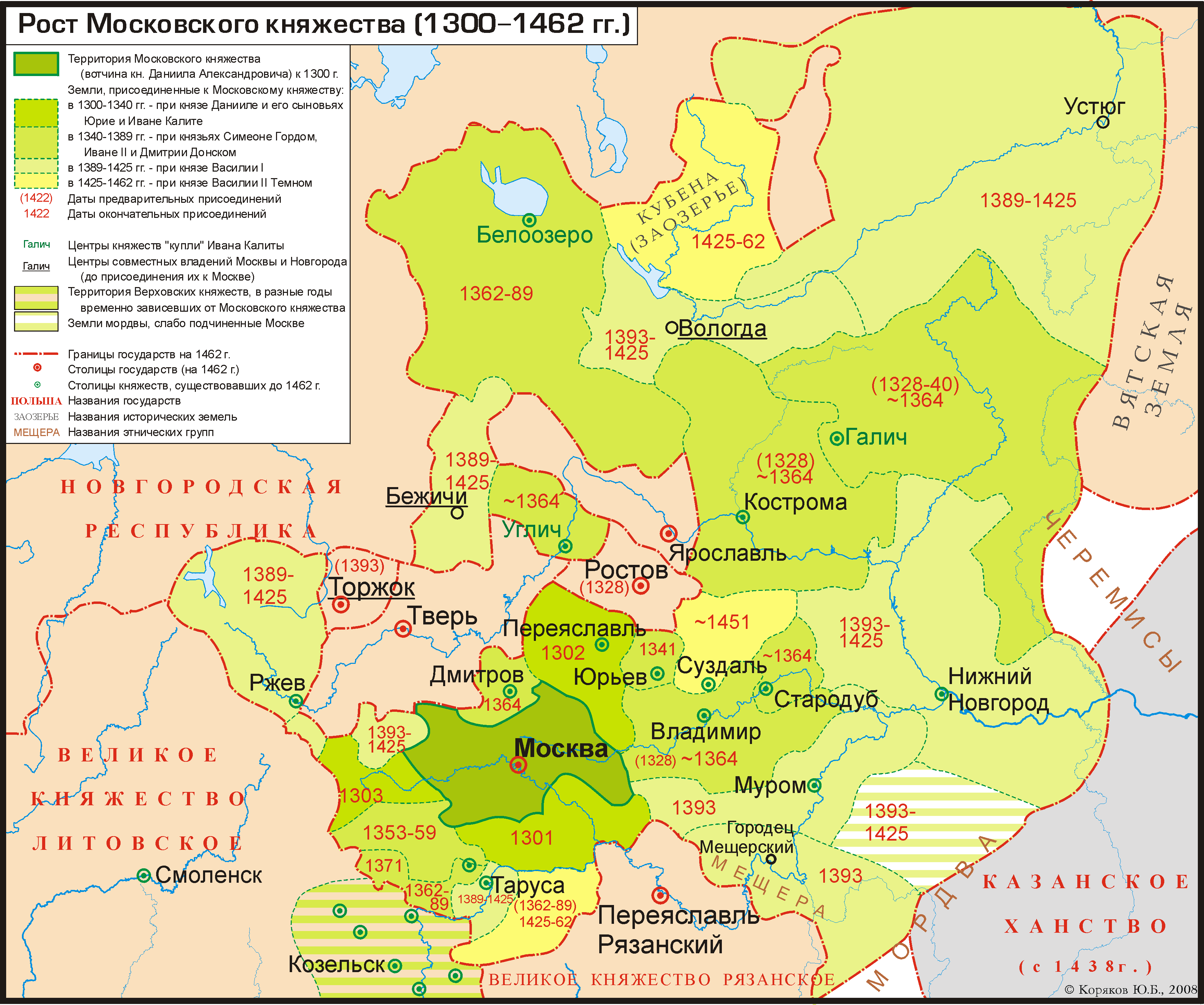
Grand Duchy of Moscow (Muscovy) during 1300–1462

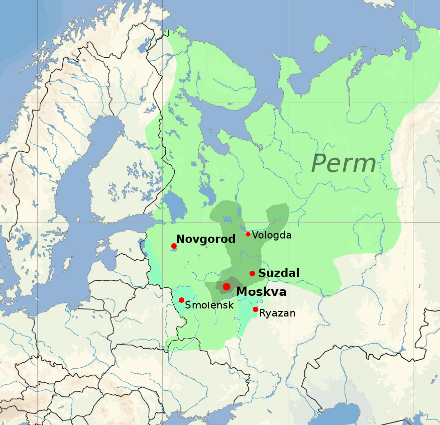
Growth of Muscovy from 1390 to 1525

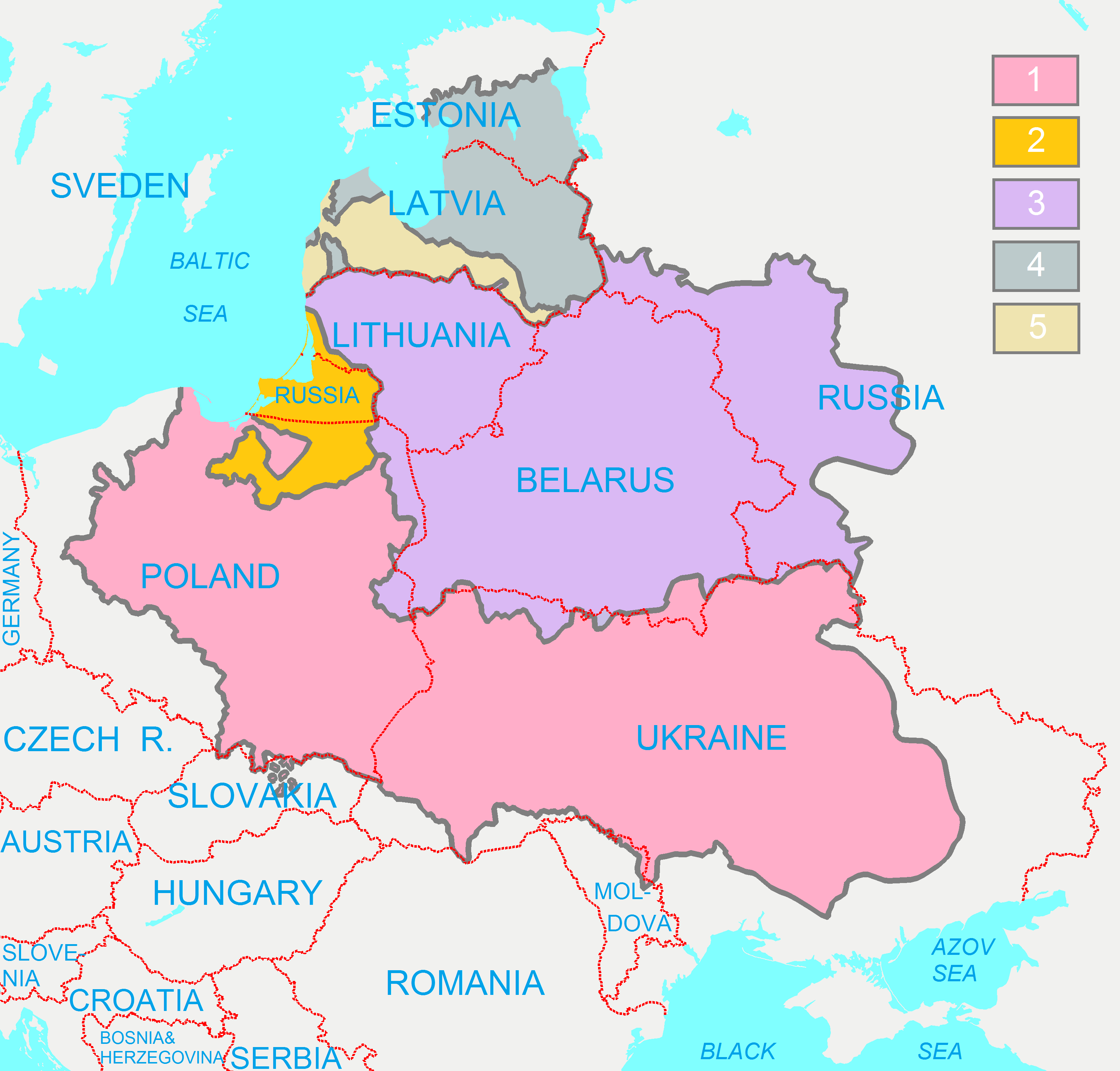
The Polish–Lithuanian Commonwealth in 1619 compared to 1991 borders

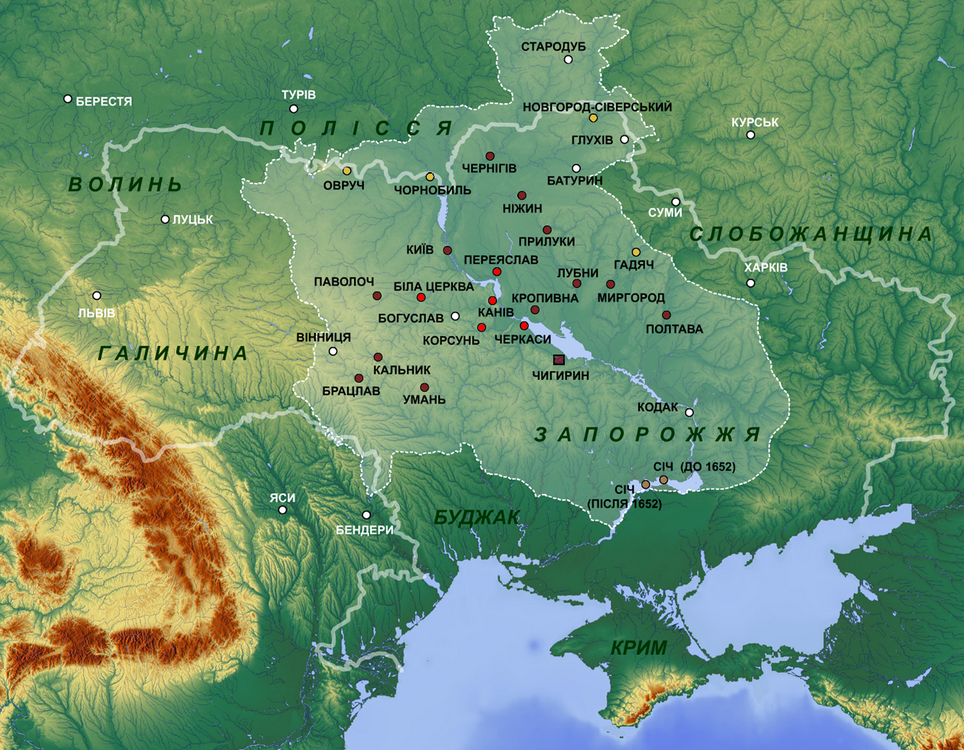
The Cossack Hetmanate in c. 1650

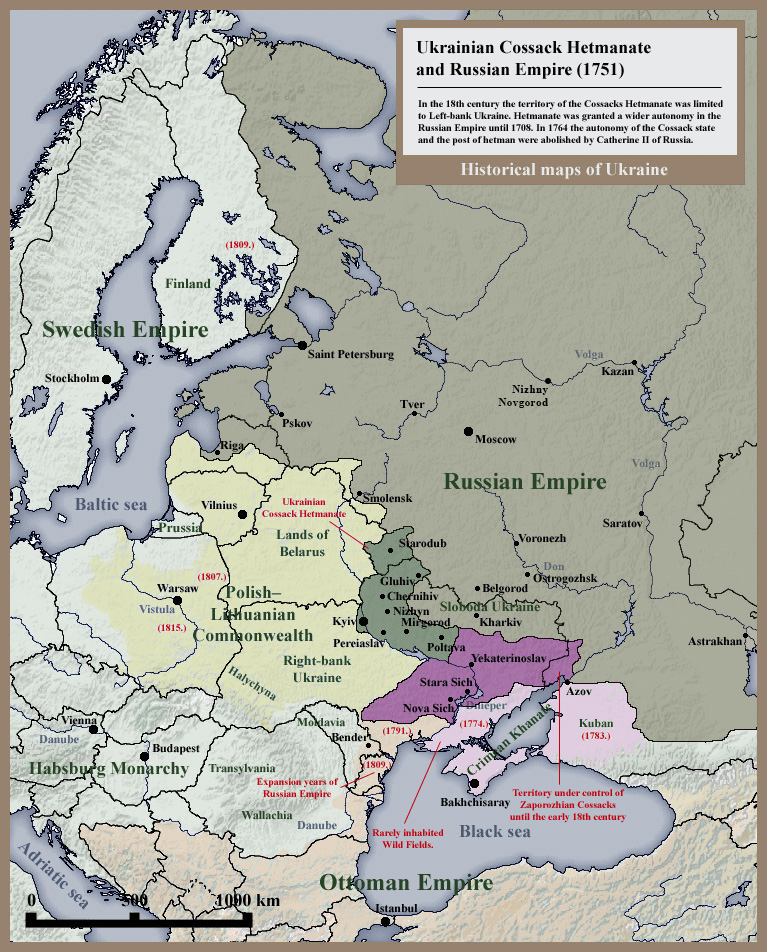
Crimean Khanate, Cossack Hetmanate, Poland–Lithuania, Russian Empire (1751)

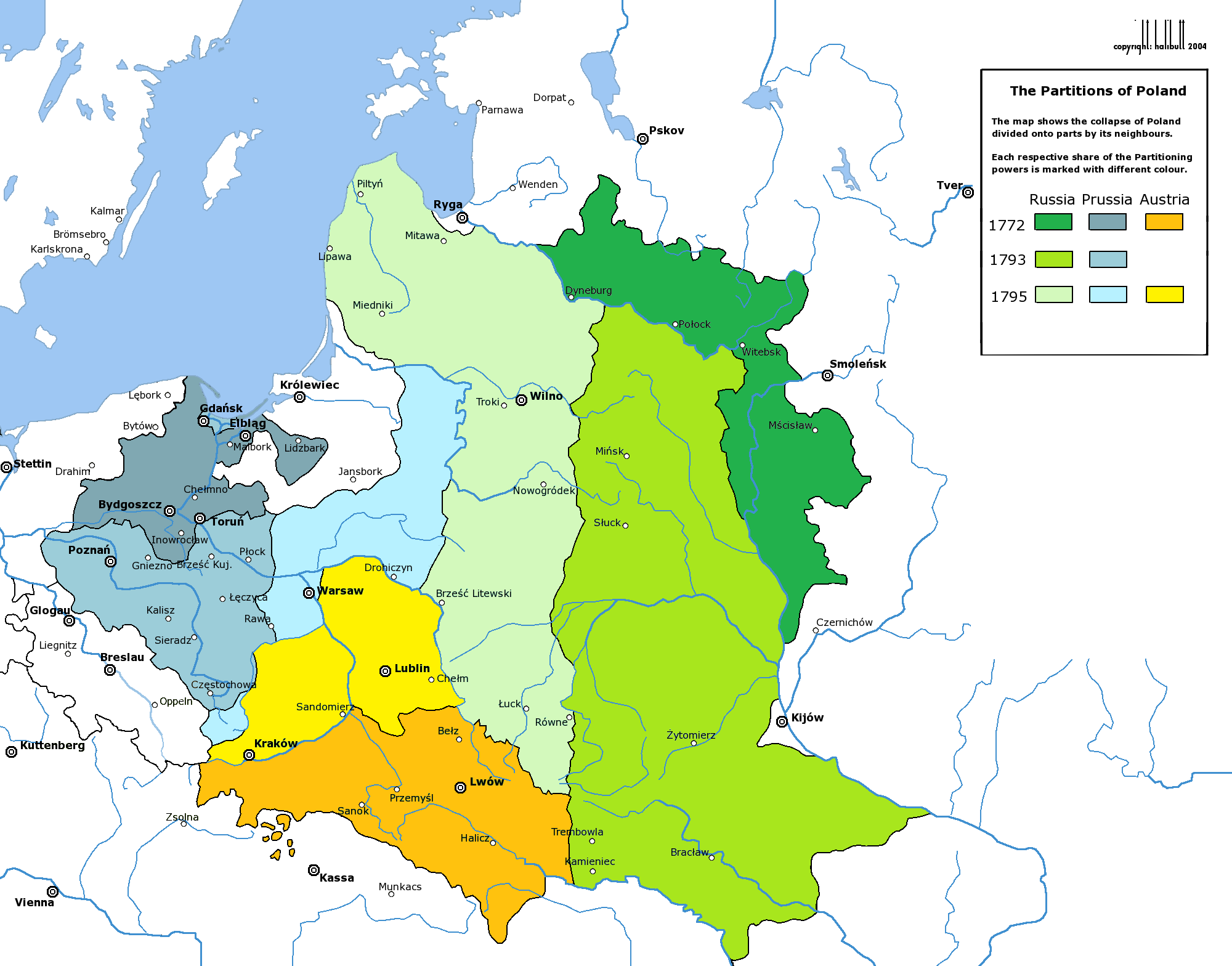
The Partitions of Poland (1772–1795)

Russian Empire in 1914 Lost in 1856–1914
Spheres of influence Protectorates (Note: Principalities of Moldavia and Wallachia in 1829–56.)

The Soviet Union (1956–1991) during the Cold War

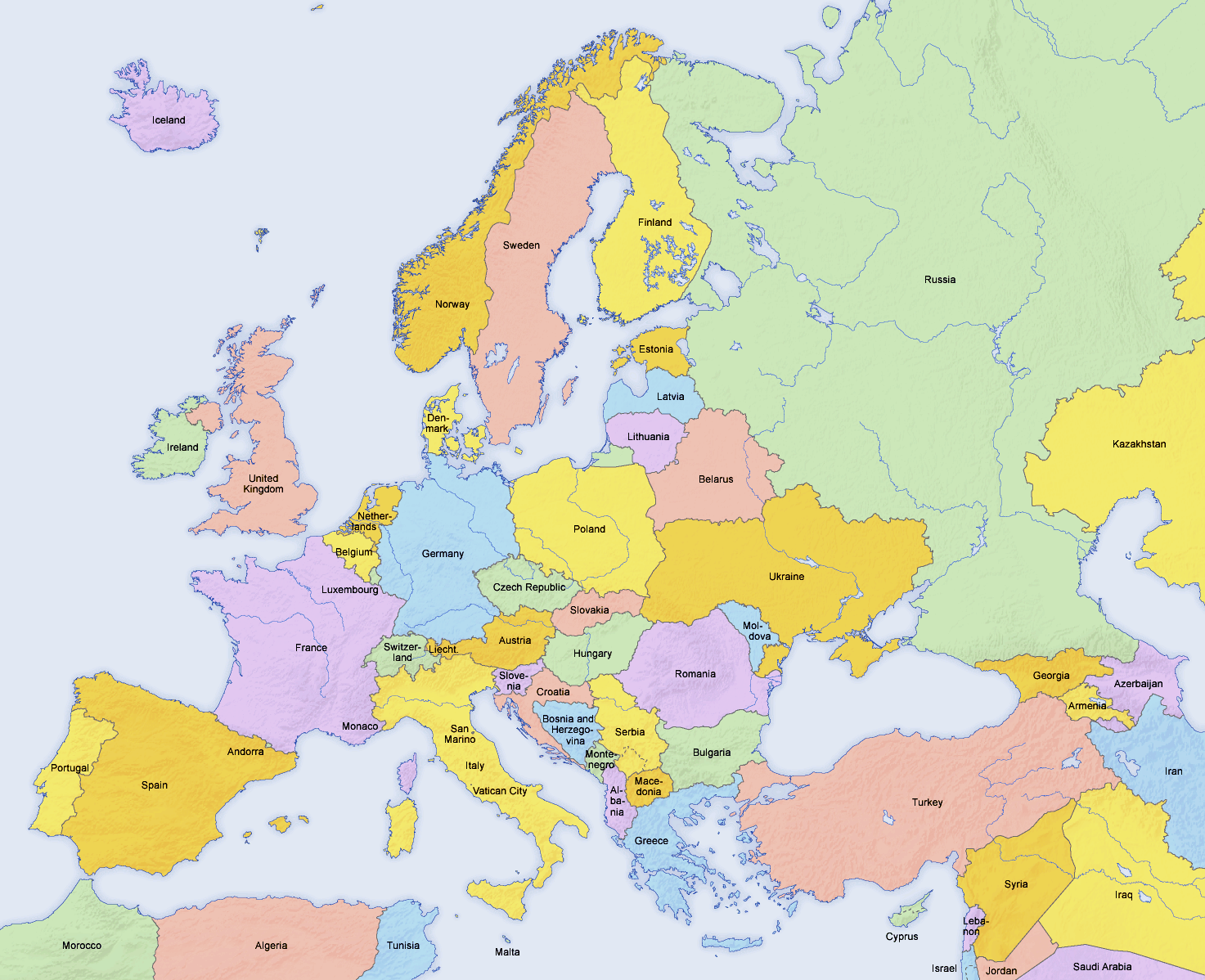
Political map of Europe in 2006

== See also ==
- Rus' principalities
- Outline of Slavic history and culture
- List of Slavic studies journals
- List of historic states of Italy
- List of historic states of Germany
- List of early Slavic peoples
- Mythical founders
  - Kyi, Shchek and Khoryv
  - Lech, Czech, and Rus'
  - Rurik, Sineus and Truvor
- Upper Oka Principalities

== Bibliography ==
- Barford, Paul M. (2001). The Early Slavs: Culture and Society in Early Medieval Eastern Europe. Ithaca, NY: Cornell University Press. ISBN 978-0-8014-3977-3.
- Halperin, Charles J. (1987). Russia and the Golden Horde: The Mongol Impact on Medieval Russian History. Indiana University. p. 222. ISBN 9781850430575. (e-book).
- Kollmann, Nancy Shields (1995). "23. The principalities of Rus' in the fourteenth century". In Reuter, Timothy (ed.). The New Cambridge Medieval History: Volume 6, c.1300–c.1415. Cambridge: Cambridge University Press. pp. 764–794. ISBN 9780521362900.
- Martin, Janet (2004). Medieval Russia: 980–1584. Cambridge: Cambridge University Press. ISBN 9780521368322. (digital printing 2004)
- Martin, Janet (2009). "From Kiev to Muscovy: The Beginnings to 1450". In Freeze, Gregory (ed.). Russia: A History (3rd ed.). Oxford: Oxford University Press. ISBN 978-0-19-150121-0. Archived from the original on 27 January 2023.
