= Council of Dolobsk =

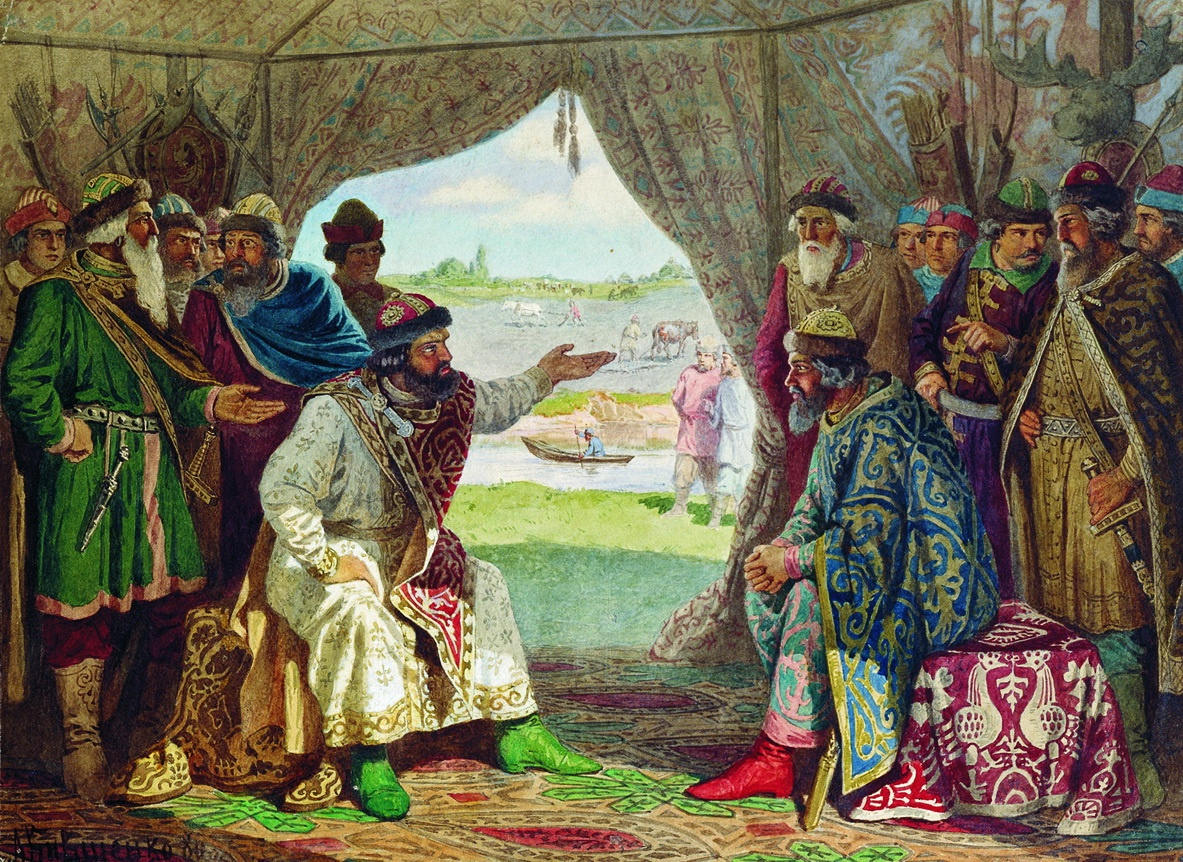
Aleksey Kivshenko (1851—1895) "Princely Council of Dolobsk; a meeting between prince Volodimer' Monomakh and prince Sviatopolk".

The Council of Dolobsk is one of the significant stages in the attempts of the princes of Kievan Rus' to stop their internal quarrels, and unite their efforts in the face of the Cuman (Polovtsi) threat. According to the Primary Chronicle (PVL), it took place in early 1103 (6611) at the Lake of Dolobsk, somewhere near Kiev (modern Kyiv). The Hypatian Codex continuation of the PVL reports a very similar Council of Dolobsk between the same people, with only slight differences in wording, but taking place in the year 1111 (6619) instead; this might be an accidental duplication of the earlier narrative sub anno 1103 (6611).

== Council of Dolobsk of 1103 ==
The Primary Chronicle narrates that both Sviatopolk II Iziaslavich (at the time Grand Prince of Kiev) and Volodimer' Monomakh (at the time Prince of Pereyaslavl) were given "inspiration by God" in order to campaign against the Polovtsi, and they decided to meet up at Lake Dolobsk to discuss it. At the princely council of Dolobsk, the two princes and their druzhina sit down in a tent to talk about their options. Men from Sviatopolk's druzhina argue: "Now that it is spring, it is not the appropriate time to head into battle; we would ruin the peasants and their crop fields." Monomakh responds by describing how the life of Rus' people at that time might go: "I am surprised, comrades, that you concern yourselves for the beast [horse] with which the peasant plows. Why do you not bear in mind that as soon as the peasant begins his plowing, the Polovcian will come, shoot him down with his bolt, seize his horse, ride on into his village, and carry off his wife, his children, and all his property? Are you concerned for the horse and not for the peasant himself?" Sviatopolk's men have no response, and he therefore says: "Look, I am already standing ready."

They decide to send messengers to Davyd Sviatoslavich of Chernigov and Oleg I Sviatoslavich of Novgorod-Seversk; Oleg refuses, saying he is ill. The subsequent narrative indicates that the Rus' campaign was successful: they defeat the Polotvsi, killing some in battle, The Polovtsi commander Beldyuz' is taken prisoner of war by Sviatopolk, handed over to Monomakh, who interrogates him. Beldyuz' offers a large sum of goods to pay for his release, but Monomakh accuses him of "[violating your] oaths by the shedding of Christian blood", and orders him to be executed. Polovtsi livestock, slaves and other spoils are captured, and carried off home to Rus'.

== Council of Dolobsk of 1111 in the Hypatian Codex ==
The Council of Dolobsk in the Hypatian Codex in the year 1103 (left) and 1111 (right)

According to the Hypatian Codex, in the year 6619 (1111), another council was held in Dolobsk between Volodimer' Monomakh and Sviatopolk Iziaslavich. The reason for their meeting was again planning a campaign against the Polovtsi, as well as exchanging the same arguments for and against the campaign, only formulated in a slightly different way. This time Sviatopolk's druzhina directly agree with Volodimer's arguments, saying: "Indeed, it is true." Sviatopolk responds: "Now, brother, I am ready to advance together with you", and not "Look, I am already standing ready", as in 1103 (6611). In 1111 Monomakh and Sviatopolk send messengers to David Sviatoslavich to join them; in the chronicle record under 1103 they also send a messenger to Oleg Sviatoslavich, who refused because of illness, but in 1111 Oleg is not mentioned at all.

Scholars have different theories about the origin of this apparent duplication, with some believing that it occurred when the Primary Chronicle was completed during the compilation of the so-called "Kyivan Codex" around 1200.

The subsequent narrative of the 1111 Rus' campaign against the Polovtsi shows many similarities with that of 1103, including killing many Polovtsi in battle and capturing livestock, other booty and prisoners of war, but this time, none of the prisoners of war is executed. Instead, Sviatopolk, Monomakh and David interrogate the Polovtsi POWs how they were defeated by the numerically inferior Rus', to which the Polovtsi captives reply: "How can we do battle with you? For others rode above you with shining and terrible weapons, aiding you", in reference to the narrator's earlier claims that angels of God provided assistance to the Christian Rus' forces against the pagan Polovtsi. The narrator then goes off on a long tangent about angels in Christian scriptures, and how this 1111 campaign confirms that the pious Rus' princes are also blessed in their struggle against the unbelievers, leaving the fate of the Polovtsi prisoners of war unspecified.

== Location ==
The location of Lake Dolobsk is unknown. Various scholars have hypothesised several locations, although ultimately it remains unknown. One candidate location of Lake Dolobsk, near which the council supposedly took place, is most likely one of the bays of Trukhaniv Island, which separated the easternmost peninsula from it - the modern northern part of the Dolobetsky Island that is part of the Hydropark in Kyiv. Therefore, the council most likely took place on Trukhaniv Island in Kyiv.

== See also ==
- Council of Liubech (1097)
- Council of Uvetichi (1100)

== Bibliography ==
=== Primary sources ===
- Cross, Samuel Hazzard; Sherbowitz-Wetzor, Olgerd P. (1953) [1930]. The Russian Primary Chronicle, Laurentian Text. Translated and edited by Samuel Hazzard Cross and Olgerd P. Sherbowitz-Wetzor (PDF). Cambridge, Massachusetts: The Mediaeval Academy of America. p. 325.
- Makhnovets, Leonid (1989). Літопис Руський за Іпатським списком [Rus' Chronicle according to the Hypatian Codex] (in Ukrainian). Kyiv: Dnipro. p. 591. ISBN 5-308-00052-2.
- Thuis, Hans (2015). Nestorkroniek. De oudste geschiedenis van het Kievse Rijk [Nestor Chronicle: the oldest history of the Kievan Realm] (in Dutch). Nijmegen: Uitgeverij Vantilt. p. 304. ISBN 9789460042287.
- Ostrowski, Donald; Birnbaum, David J. (7 December 2014). "Rus' primary chronicle critical edition – Interlinear line-level collation". pvl.obdurodon.org (in Church Slavic). Archived from the original on 28 April 2025.

=== Literature ===
- Mykhailo Hrushevsky, History of Ukraine-Rusʹ, Volume 2. (1992). Kyiv.
- Petro Tolochko, Київська Русь [Kyivan Rus'] (1996). Kyiv: S. V. Yevtushenko.
- Kotlyar, Mykola (2004). "Долобський з'їзд 1103" [Council of Dolobsk 1103]. Encyclopedia of History of Ukraine (in Ukrainian). Institute of History of Ukraine. Archived from the original on 24 June 2016.
