= Sergey Ivanov (painter) =

Russian painter (1864–1910)

- Сергей Иванов
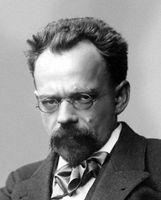
- Born: Sergey Vasilyevich Ivanov; June 16, 1864; Ruza, Moscow Governorate, Russian Empire
- Died: August 16, 1910 (aged 46); Svistukh, Dmitrovsky District, Russian Empire
- Education: Imperial Academy of Arts (1885)
- Occupation: Painter
- Known for: genre and history paintings
- Style: Social realism

Sergey Vasilyevich Ivanov (Russian: Сергей Васильевич Иванов; 16 June [O.S. 4 June] 1864 – 16 August [O.S. 3 August] 1910) was a Russian genre and history painter, known for his social realism.

== Biography ==
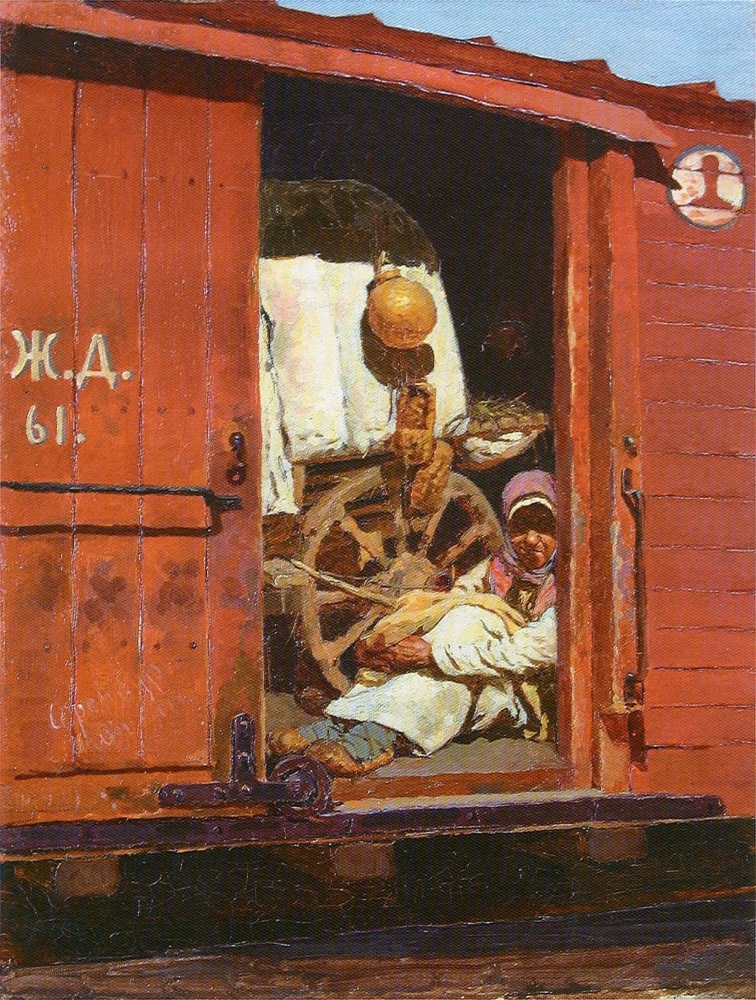
Female Migrant (1886)

His father was a tax collector for the Customs Service. He displayed an early talent for art, but his father was opposed on the grounds that it would not be a secure way to make a living so, at the age of eleven, he was enrolled at the Konstantinov Land Surveying Institute.

The institute was not to his liking and he was an indifferent student, so a family friend who was an amateur artist encouraged his father to send him to the Moscow School of Painting, Sculpture and Architecture (MSPSA). With a recommendation from Vasily Perov, he began auditing classes there in 1878; studying with Illarion Pryanishnikov and Evgraf Sorokin.

He left there in 1882 to attend the Imperial Academy of Arts. Dissatisfaction with the school's administration and financial difficulties forced him to return to Moscow in 1884. He went back to the MSPSA and graduated in 1885.

At that time he started work on a series of paintings devoted to "Pereselenchestvo", the process of resettling peasants to outlying, vacant areas (mostly in Siberia) in an attempt to ease overcrowding in the villages after the Emancipation reform of 1861. The move was often very arduous and many died on the way. From 1885 to 1889, he toured the provinces of Samara, Saratov, Astrakhan and Orenburg, documenting the migrants' lives. This was followed by a series on convicts. In the mid-1890s, he began to focus on historical works.

In 1899, he became a member of the Peredvizhniki, but was soon dissatisfied with their emphasis on "lovely scenes". In 1903, he was one of the founders of the "Союз русских художников" (Union of Russian Artists), temporarily replacing the better-known "Mir Iskusstva". In 1905, the Imperial Academy named him an "Academician". Later that year, during the Moscow Uprising, he made numerous sketches while also helping the wounded.

From 1903 to 1910, he taught at the MSPSA. He was also known as an illustrator; creating drawings for classics by Gogol, Lermontov and Pushkin, among others. He died of a heart attack at his dacha near the Yakhroma River.

== Selected paintings ==
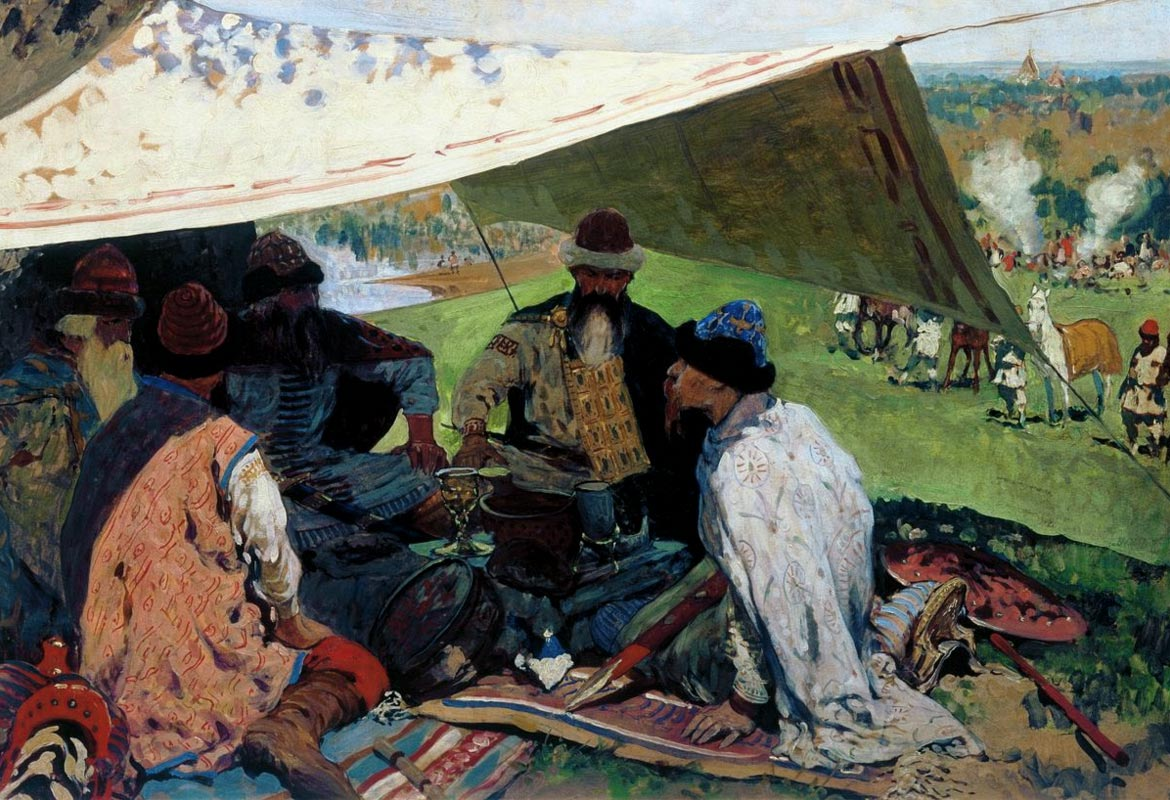
The Council of Uvetichi

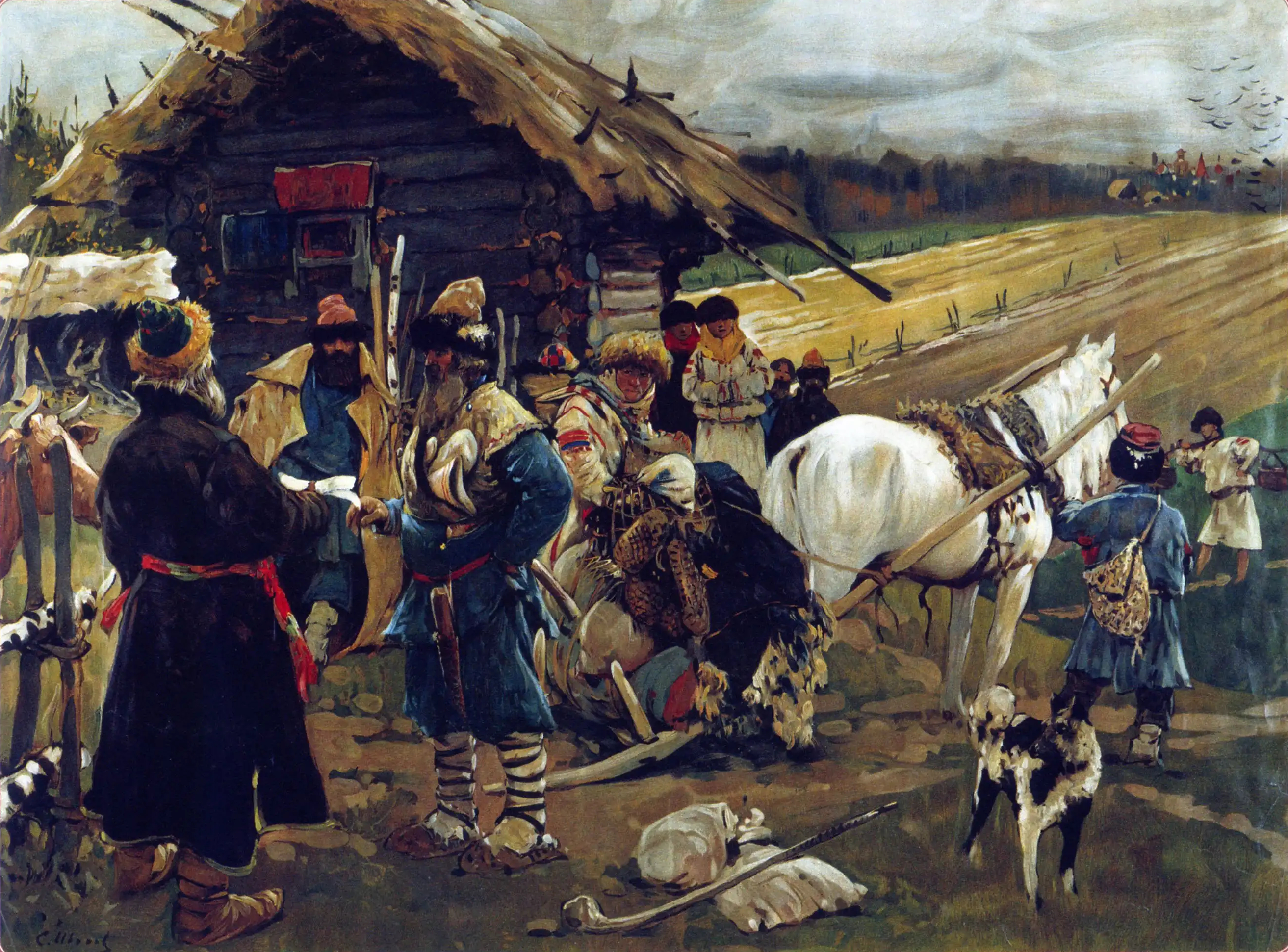
A Peasant Leaving His Landlord
on Yuri's Day

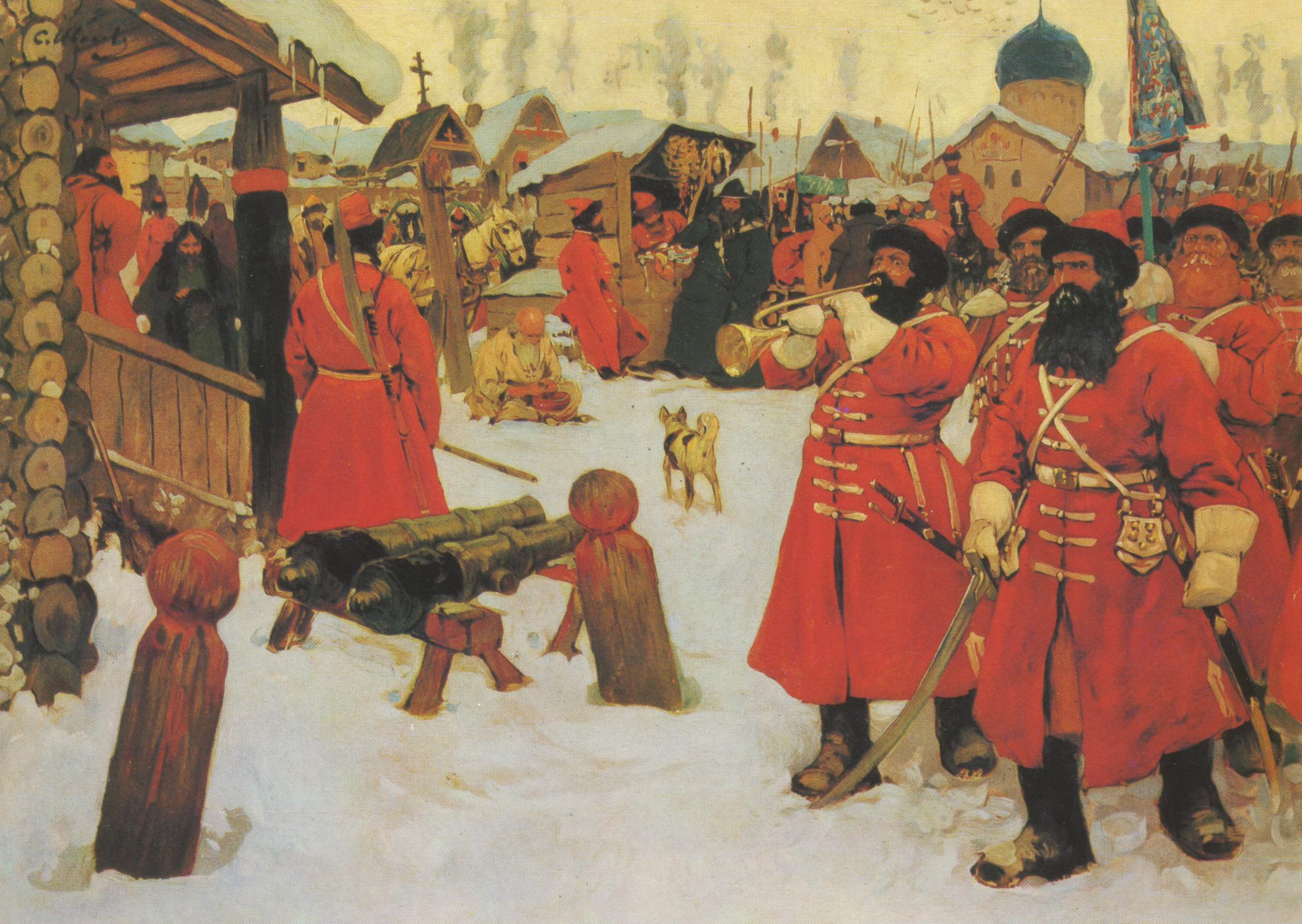
The Streltsy

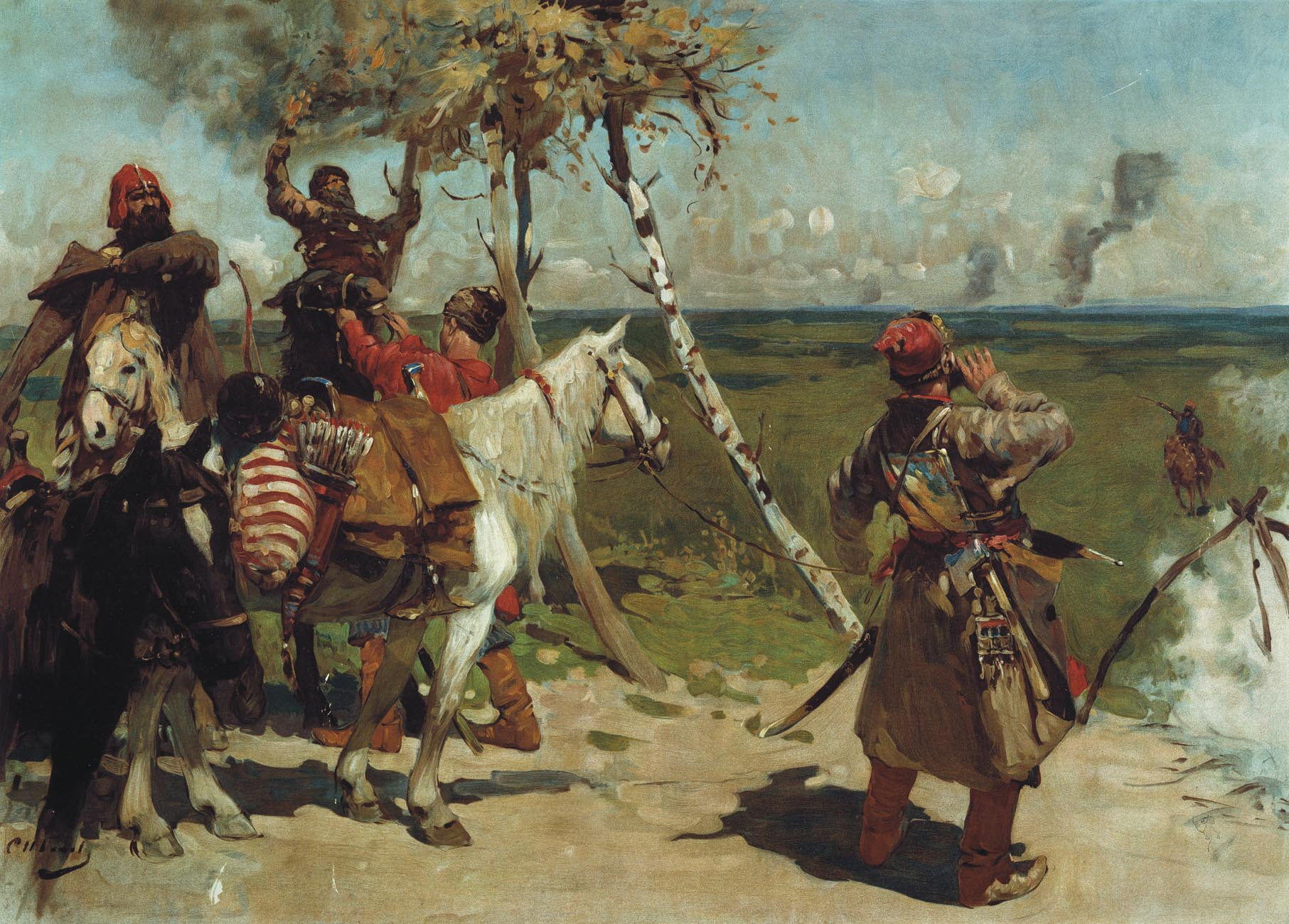
Guards at the Southern Border of Muscovy

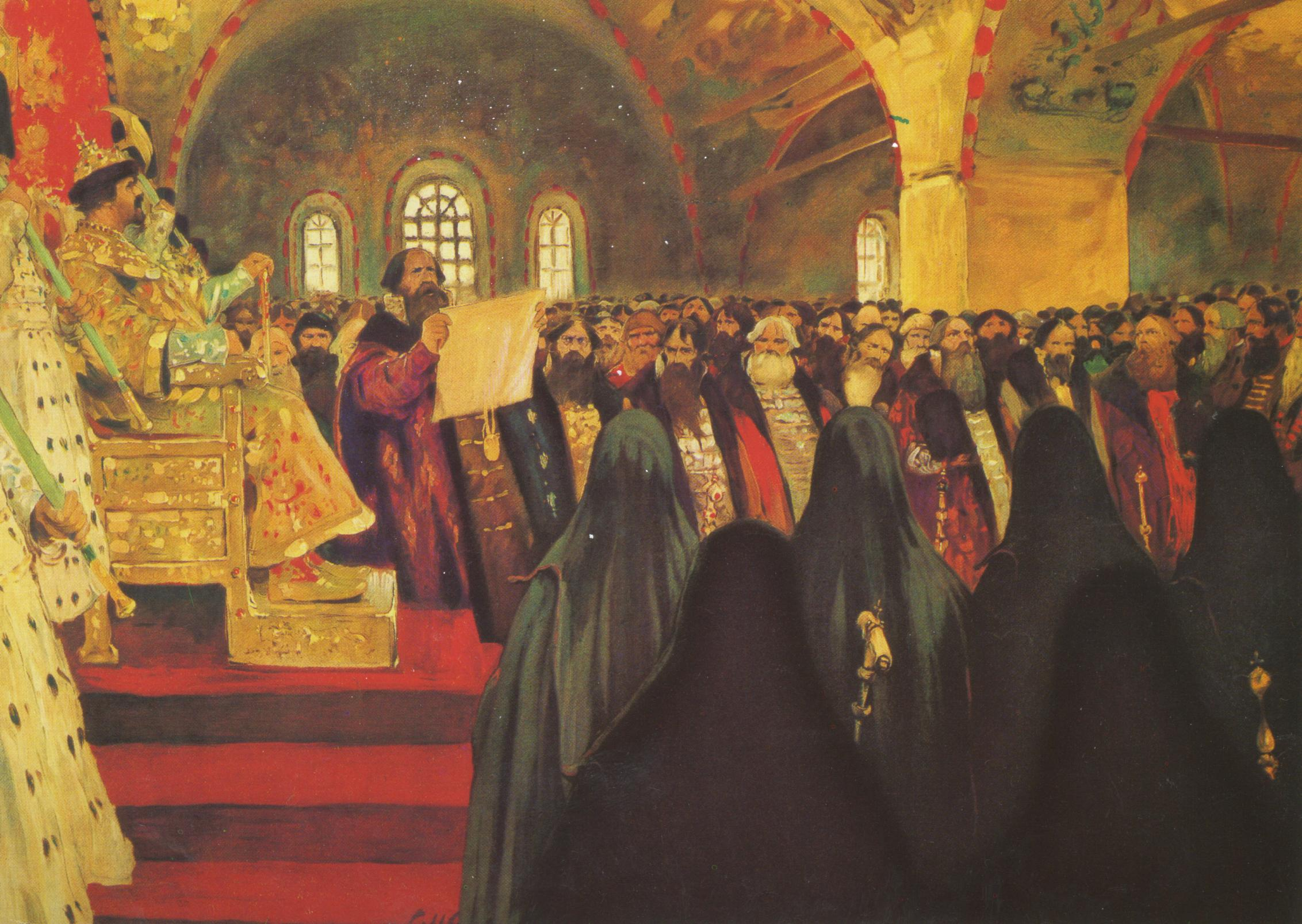
Zemsky Sobor

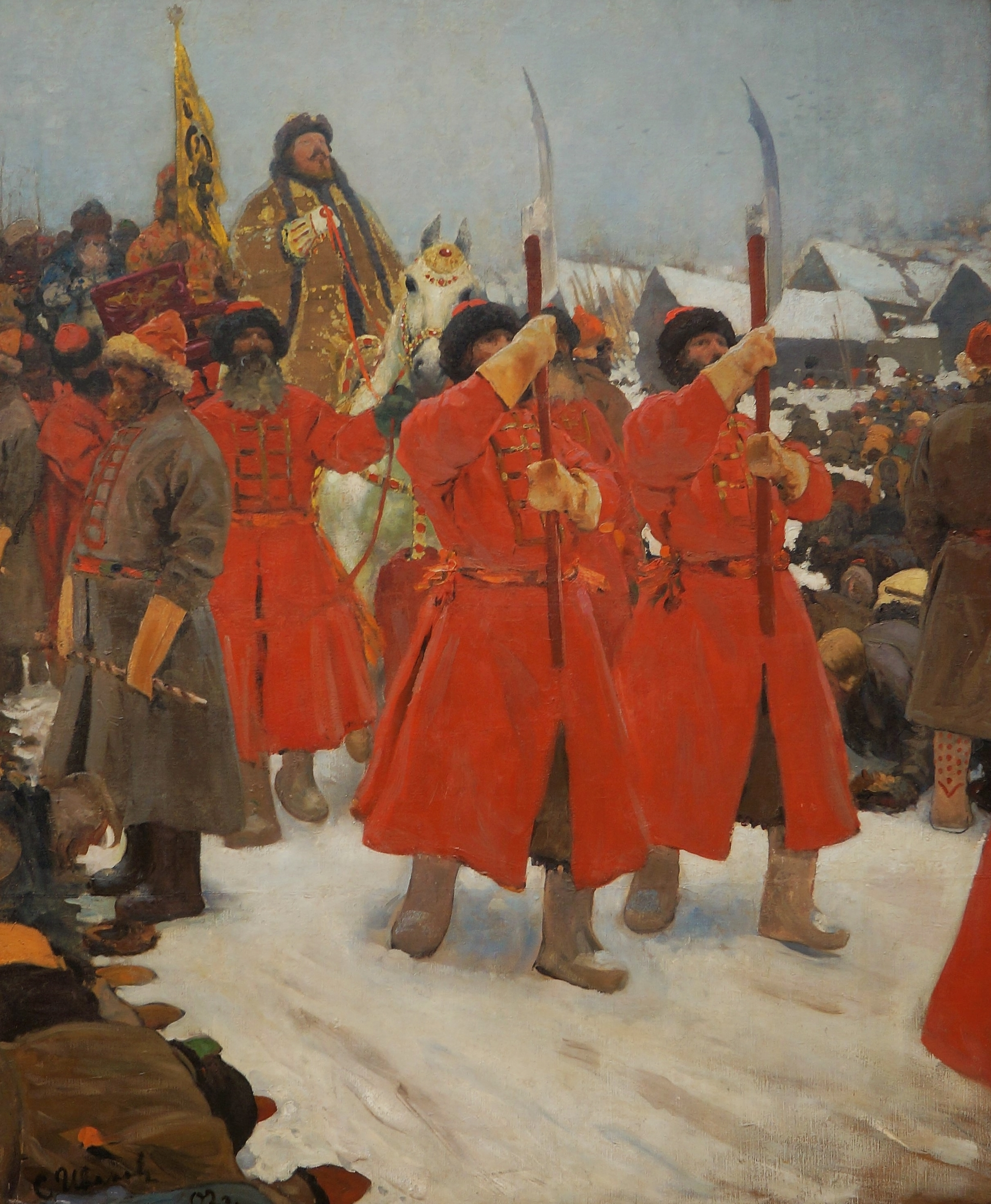
Russian Tsar in XVI
