= Council of Uvetichi =

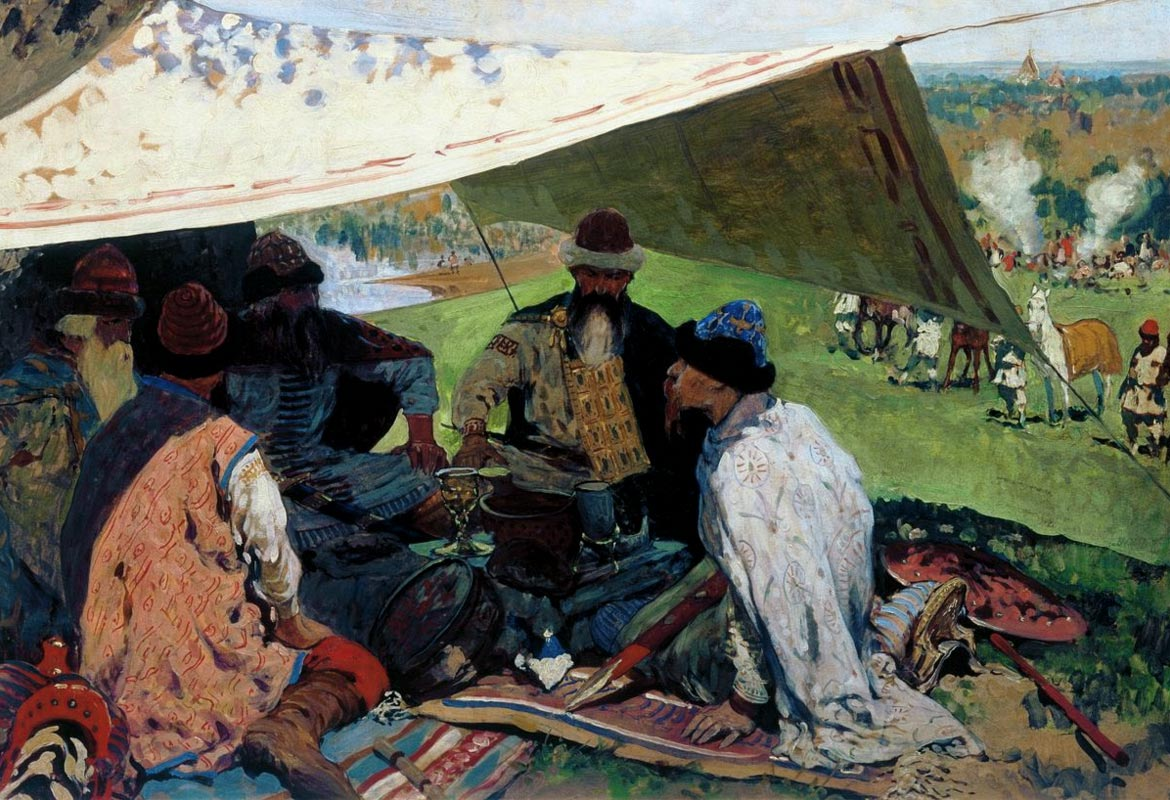
Princes of Kievan Rus' make peace in Uvetichi. Painting by Sergey Ivanov

The Council of Uvetichi consisted of two meetings of the senior generation of princes of Kievan Rus'. It took place in August 1100, and it had a twofold purpose: to bring about a reconciliation among the princes and to pass judgment on Prince Davyd Igorevich. The venue of the conference was the town of Uvetichi, which is on the right bank of the Dnieper not far from Kiev. It is now the village of Vytachiv in the Kyiv Oblast.

The Rus' Primary Chronicle ("The Tale of Bygone Years", the Povest' vremennykh let) is the primary source of information for the meetings, and the information is presented twice in the chronicle: first in detail under the year 1097, and then sequentially under the years 1098-1100.

== Background ==
The council was preceded by severe conflict involving the Volhynian and Galician regions. It began in November 1097 when, violating the agreements reached at the earlier meeting of princes at the Council of Liubech, Volhynian Prince Davyd Igorevich and Prince Svyatopolk II Izyaslavich of Kiev had captured and blinded Vasilko Rostislavich, prince of Terebovlia, whom Svyatopolk had tricked into coming to Kiev. The princes' reasons for convening included their suspicion of an alliance between Vasilko and Vladimir Vsevolodovich (Vladimir Monomakh) with the goal of installing Vladimir in Kiev and Vasilko in all the western regions, as well as Prince Davyd's concern for his own fate.

Davyd had initiated a campaign to take possession of Vasilko's holdings, but was opposed by Vasilko's older brother Volodar, who besieged Davyd at Buzhsk and succeeded in securing the release of his brother. In the spring of the following year, 1098, Vasilko and Volodar besieged Davyd in the town of Vladimir. In the end they made peace, after the boyars responsible for the blinding of Vasilko were turned over to them for adjudication.

In 1098 there was a meeting in Gorodets of Svyatopolk's cousins, Vladimir Monomakh, Davyd Svyatoslavich, and Oleg Svyatoslavich. Threatening military action, they demanded that Svyatopolk expel Davyd Igorevich. Then Svyatopolk deprived Davyd Igorevich of his throne in Vladimir, causing him to flee to Poland, and Svyatopolk installed his son Mstislav in Vladimir.

Subsequently, Sviatopolk went to war with Vasilko and Volodar, asserting that according to dynastic law, the lands which they held belonged to him. Svyatopolk was defeated Rozhne Pole. King Coloman the Learned of Hungary joined the conflict on the side of Svyatopolk. The exiled Davyd Igorevich took the side of Vasilko and Volodar, and he brought in the Cumans and defeated the Hungarians at the Vyagro River.

Davyd then besieged Mstislav in Vladimir and captured the town. Svyatopolk's son was killed by an arrow during the siege on June 12, 1099. On August 5, the town of Vladimir was recaptured by Putyata, a Kievan military commander, but then David with the help of the Cumans once again took possession of Vladimir and Lutsk as well, driving out Svyatopolk's ally, Svyatoslav Davidovich.

== The Council and its consequences ==
The first meeting took place on August 10, and Svyatopolk, Vladimir Monomakh, Davyd Svyatoslavich and Oleg "made peace among themselves." When they met again on August 30, they summoned Davyd Igorevich. After listening to his explanation, the brothers pointedly moved away from him, leaving him by himself, and they would not allow him to speak.

The kinsmen mounted their horses: Svyatopolk was with his military retinue and Davyd and Oleg each with their own retinues, but Davyd Igorevich remained on the sidelines since the others would not admit him to their presence while they discussed him. Once they made their decision, they sent messengers to him: Svyatopolk sent Putyata, Vladimir sent Orogost and Ratibor, and Davyd and Oleg sent Torchin.

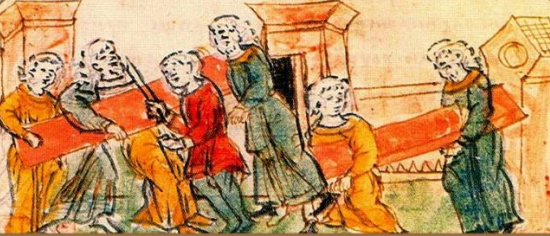
The Blinding of Vasylko. Miniature of Radzivil chronicle of the 15th century

The envoys announced the kinsmen's decision: "We will not give you the throne at Vladimir because you raised a sword at us in a way never seen before in the Land of Rus'" He was deprived of Vladimir-Volhynsky, which was given to Svyatopolk's son Yaroslav. In exchange he received from Svyatopolk the towns of Buzhsky Ostrog, Duben, Czartorysk and wergeld of 400 grivnas from the other brothers, that is, 200 from Vladimir and 200 from the sons of Svyatoslav. Later Svyatopolk gave the town of Dorogobuzh to Davyd. As for Vasilko and Volodar, a decision was made to deprive Vasilko of his throne at Terebovl, apparently because a blinded prince was considered incapable of ruling. Envoys were sent to Volodar with orders that either he was to take care of his blind brother personally, or else send his brother to Kiev, where the princes promised to take care of him. Vasilko and Volodar did not accept these orders. The conditions under which the peace was concluded are not known, but Vasilko did remain Prince of Terebovl until his death.

A short time later Svyatopolk came into conflict with Prince Yaroslav Yaropolkovich, his nephew by the older brother of his who had been killed by Vasilko and Volodar in 1086. In the end Yaroslav died in a Kiev prison.

== See also ==
- Council of Liubech (1097)
- Council of Dolobsk (1103 and 1111)

== Bibliography ==
=== Primary sources ===
- Cross, Samuel Hazzard; Sherbowitz-Wetzor, Olgerd P. (1953) [1930]. The Russian Primary Chronicle, Laurentian Text. Translated and edited by Samuel Hazzard Cross and Olgerd P. Sherbowitz-Wetzor (PDF). Cambridge, Massachusetts: The Mediaeval Academy of America. p. 325.
- Makhnovets, Leonid (1989). Літопис Руський за Іпатським списком [Rus' Chronicle according to the Hypatian Codex] (in Ukrainian). Kyiv: Dnipro. p. 591. ISBN 5-308-00052-2.
- Thuis, Hans (2015). Nestorkroniek. De oudste geschiedenis van het Kievse Rijk [Nestor Chronicle: the oldest history of the Kievan Realm] (in Dutch). Nijmegen: Uitgeverij Vantilt. p. 304. ISBN 9789460042287.
