= Davyd Sviatoslavich =

- Prince of Chernigov
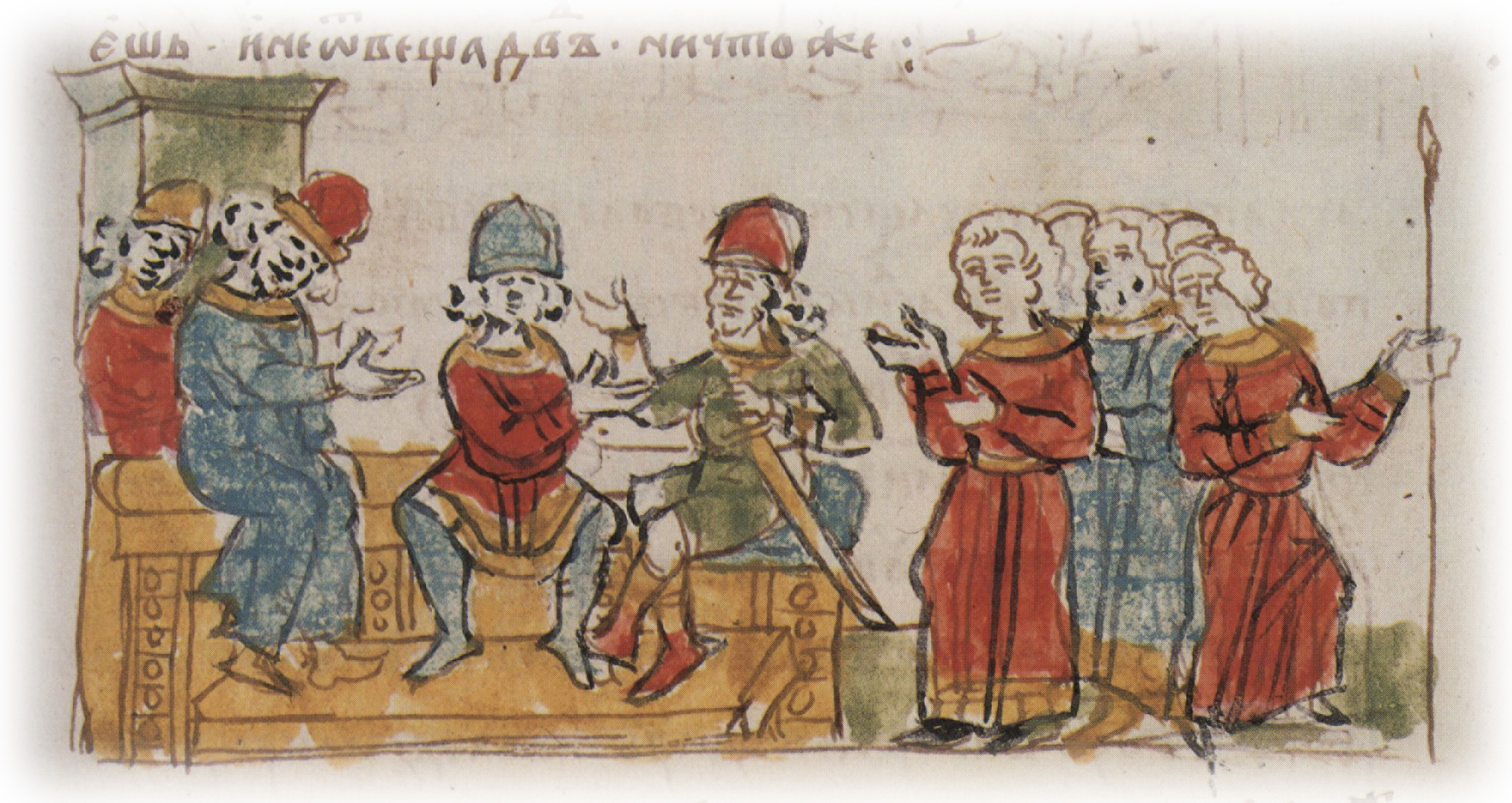
- Council of Uvetichi, brothers, Svyatopolk, Vladimir, David, Oleg
- Reign: 1097–1123
- Predecessor: Oleg I of Chernigov
- Successor: Yaroslav Sviatoslavich
- Born: ?
- Died: 1123; Chernigov
- Spouse: Theodosia
- Issue: Vladimir Davydovich; Iziaslav Davydovich; Vsevolod Davycovich; Rostislav Davydovich; Sviatoslav Davydovich
- House: Sviatoslavichi
- Father: Sviatoslav Yaroslavich
- Mother: Cecillia

Davyd Sviatoslavich was the ruler of Murom and Chernigov.

The date of his birth is uncertain. Before his father's death was appointed to the Pereyaslav Principality, however in 1076 he ran to Murom which was located as far away as possible from Kiev. In 1093 Davyd was appointed a prince of Smolensk. During the war of his brother Oleg I of Chernigov against Sviatopolk II of Kiev and Vladimir II Monomakh he went up against the Vladimir's son Izyaslav of Murom. Oleg and Davyd in the united coalition of Sviatoslavichi managed to recover Smolensk and defeated Izyaslav at Murom where the last one perished.

On the Council of Liubech in 1097 Davyd was appointed to Chernigov, while Oleg was given Novhorod-Siverskyi. Protested against the rule of Sviatopolk who after the council together with Davyd Igorevich took Vasylko Rostyslavich a hostage and blinded him. The last two were in the constant warfare in the western areas of the Grand Duchy. Under pressure from Monomakh and Sviatoslavichi, Sviatopolk outcast Davyd Igorevich to Poland. Later supported Sviatopolk in the war against Rostislavichi (one of whom was Vasylko). Davyd sent along his son Sviatoslav, but after an unsuccessful campaign the last one came back to his father and upon the death of his wife became a monk. At the Council of Witchew between the Sviatoslavichi, Monomakh, and Sviatopolk agreed to peace, stop the civil war, and consolidated their forces against the foreign enemies. At the council it was decided to cast Davyd Igorevich away from government duties, yet leaving him with some estates in Volyn.

Davyd sometimes together with his brother, but more often with Vladimir Monomakh raided the Cuman lands from 1103 to 1111. Among numerous battles the most important one were at the Suteni river and Salnitsa river (March 27, 1111). During that campaign they managed to occupy the Cuman cities of Sharukan which is believed to be located somewhere between Chuhuiv and Zmiiv, and Sugrov. Davyd also greatly assisted Monomakh in the war against Polatsk Prince and Prince of Volyn in 1115–1118, while their sons continued to raid the Cumania.

== Family ==
His son Sviatoslav Davydovich is also known as Saint Nicholas / Nikola Sviatosha, wonderworker of the Kiev Caves.

== Sources ==
- Profile at hrono.ru
- Family history
