= Vasilko Rostislavich =

Prince and member of the Rurik dynasty

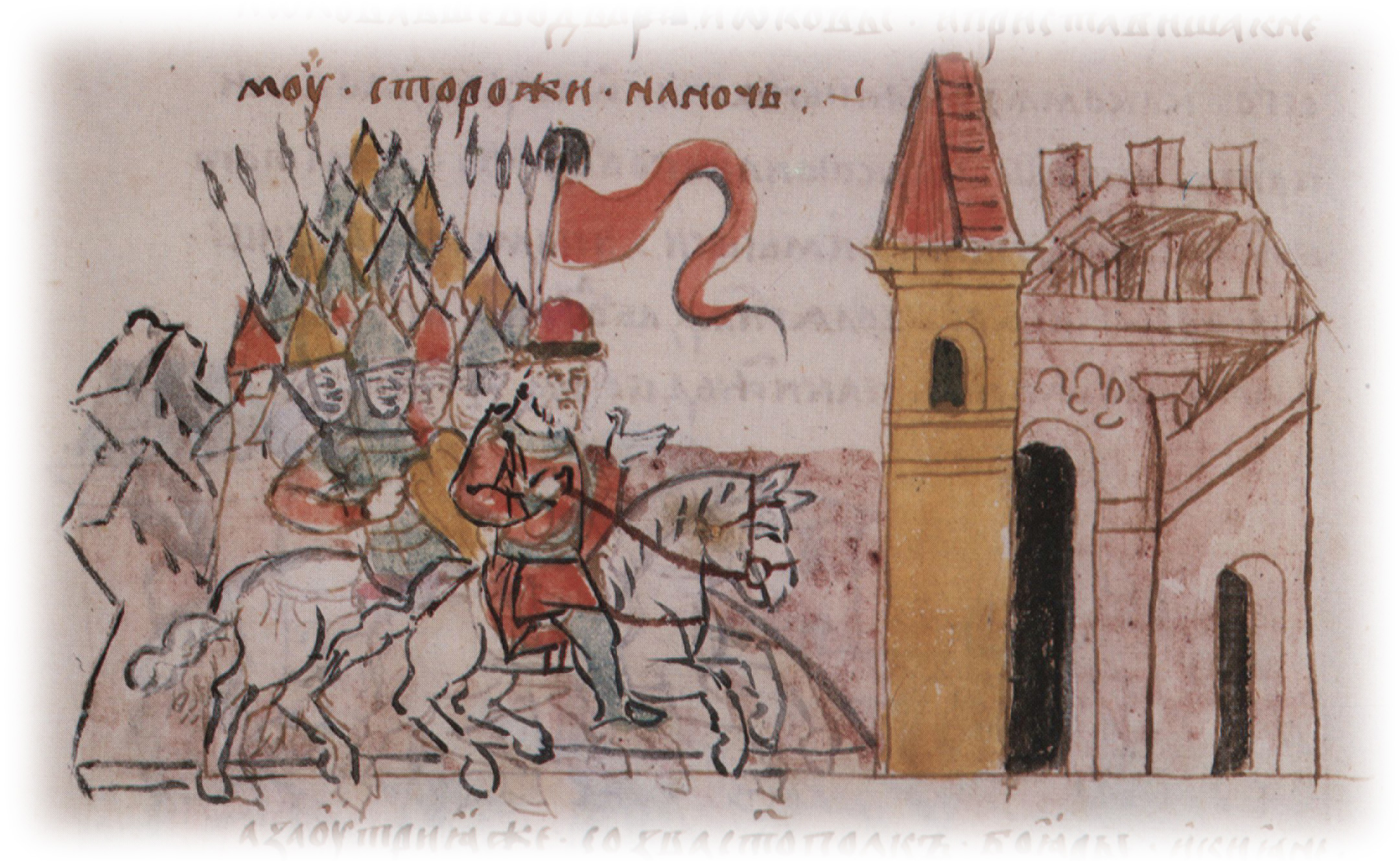
Vasilko at the head of the cavalry, miniature from the Radziwiłł Chronicle (15th century)

Vasilko Rostislavich (Ukrainian: Василько Ростиславич, romanized: Vasylko Rostyslavych; Russian: Василько Ростиславич; c. 1066 – 1124) was a prince of Kievan Rus' and member of the Rurik dynasty. He was the first Prince of Terebovl' from 1092. His Byzantine-style blinding was very unusual among the Rurik dynasty.

== Life ==
He was the third son of Rostislav Vladimirovich, the prince of Tmutarakan. The historian Martin Dimnik writes that Vasilko's mother was Lanka, a daughter of King Béla I of Hungary.

In November 1097, the Prince David Igorevich of Volhynia and Prince Sviatopolk II Iziaslavich of Kiev captured and blinded Vasilko Rostislavich, whom Sviatopolk had tricked into coming to Kiev. Thus, the agreements reached at an earlier meeting of the princes at the Council of Liubech were broken and war ensued.

== See also ==
- Council of Liubech
- Council of Uvetichi

== Sources ==
- Rostyslavych Vasylko / Ukrainians in the world Archived 2020-10-27 at the Wayback Machine
- Bárány, Attila (2012). "The Expansion of the Kingdom of Hungary in the Middle Ages (1000–1490)". In Berend, Nóra (ed.). The Expansion of Central Europe in the Middle Ages. Ashgate Variorum. pp. 333–380. ISBN 978-1-4094-2245-7.
- Dimnik, Martin (1994). The Dynasty of Chernigov, 1054–1146. Pontifical Institute of Mediaeval Studies. ISBN 0-88844-116-9.
- Vernadsky, George (1972). A History of Russia, Volume II: Kievan Russia. Yale University Press. ISBN 0-300-01647-6.
