= Council of Liubech =

1097 princely council

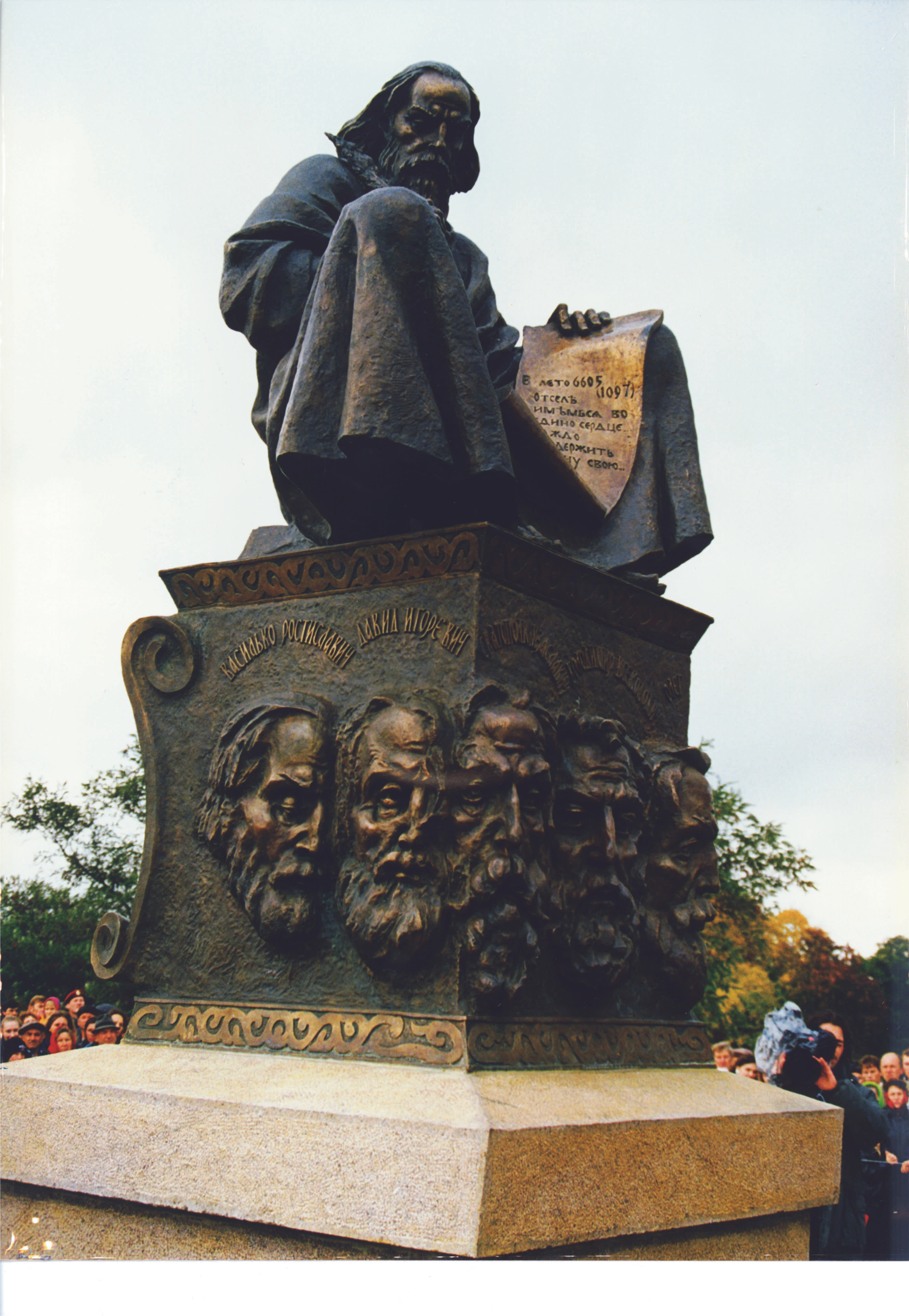
Monument in Liubech (1997) by Giennadij Jerszow

The Council of Liubech or Lyubech, also known as the Liubech Conference, (Note: Russian: Любечский съезд, romanized: Lyubyechski syezd; Ukrainian: Лю́бецький з'їзд, romanized: Liubetskyy z’ïzd.) was one of the best documented princely meetings in Kievan Rus' that took place in Liubech on October 19, 1097. The council ended the Chernigov war of succession (1093–1097) between Sviatopolk II and Vladimir II Monomakh against Oleg I of Chernigov, who fought for the heritage of their father, Sviatoslav II.

== History ==
The council, initiated by Vladimir Monomakh, brought together Sviatopolk II, Vasilko Rostislavich, Davyd Sviatoslavich, Oleg I of Chernigov, and other princes. It aimed to stop the Chernigov war of succession, to pacify the people, and to present a unified front against the Cumans. It resulted in the division of Kievan Rus' among the princes, letting their immediate families inherit them. This broke a rota system (lestvichnoe pravo) that had been followed in Kievan Rus' for two centuries, which saw the oldest son take the throne and was ruled by a succession of the eldest. Further, rulership of certain regions were never stable but shifted gradually upwards.

As a result, each prince within Kievan Rus’ was given his principality as patrimonial domain.

Following the conference in the second-quarter of the 12th century, historical chronicles began mentioning local princes as the growing issue became the regularization of relations between local princes and their individual clan estates, or principalities.

== Allocation ==
The Council assigned/confirmed the principalities as follows:

- Sviatopolk II received Kiev, Turov, Pinsk, and the title of grand prince.
- Vladimir II Monomakh received Pereyaslavl, the Rostov-Suzdal lands, Smolensk, and Beloozero. His son Mstislav received Great Novgorod.
- Oleg, Davyd, and Yaroslav, both sons of Sviatoslav II of Kiev and deemed the "outcast princes," received Chernigov, Tmutarakan, Ryazan, and Murom.

Of the remaining "outcast" princes:

- David Igorevich, the prince of Volhynia, received Vladimir-in-Volhynia.
- Volodar and Vasilko Rostislavich received Peremyshl, Terebovl, and Cherven.

== Result ==
This change effectively established a feudal system in Kievan Rus' in the opinion of some scholars, although others have argued that it created a federative structure instead. It stopped the struggle for Chernigov, but was not observed perfectly. After the death of Sviatopolk in 1113, the citizens of Kiev revolted and summoned Vladimir Monomakh to the throne. Nevertheless, the new dispensation allowed other principalities to consolidate their power and to develop as powerful regional centers: most notably Galicia–Volhynia and Vladimir-Suzdal. Further, the conference resulted in numerous policy developments including continued progress towards the Kievan Russian legal code known as the Russkaya Pravda and the first historiographical chronicle known as the Initial Compilation, or Nachalnyy svod, which would form the basis of the Primary Chronicle.

Despite the conference's larger goal of uniting the Kievan princes against the Cumans (otherwise known as the Polovtsians), the feuding did not end between the princes and instead led to continued conflicts. The blinding of David Igorevich by Vsevolod I of Kiev acted as a catalyst for continued warring which led to Vladimir II to organize the Council of Uvetichi on August 10, 1100.

== Monuments ==
- 1997: Monument to the Lyubech Congress of Princes (Gennady Ershov, Ukraine)

== See also ==
- Council of Uvetichi (1100)
- Council of Dolobsk (1103 and 1111)

== Bibliography ==
- Nora Berend, ed. (2007). Christianization and the Rise of Christian Monarchy. University of Cambridge: Cambridge University Press. p. 393.
- Martin, Janet (1995). Medieval Russia, 980–1584. Cambridge: Cambridge University Press. p. 450. ISBN 9780521368322.
- Martin, Janet (2007). Medieval Russia: 980–1584. Second Edition. E-book. Cambridge: Cambridge University Press. ISBN 978-0-511-36800-4.
- Power crisis in Ruthenia. Ukrinform. 20 October 2015
