= Principality of Terebovlia =

Former country

Principality of Terebovlia Теребовлянське князівство (Ukrainian) Terebovlianske kniazivstvo
- Principality of Kievan Rus'
- 1084–1141
- Capital: Terebovlia
- History
  - Established: 1084
  - United with Zvenyhorod Principality and Principality of Peremyshl: 1141
Preceded by	Succeeded by
Kievan Rus'	Principality of Galicia

The Principality of Terebovlia (Ukrainian: Теребовлянське князівство) was a principality of Kievan Rus' established as an appanage around the year 1084 and given to Vasylko Rostyslavych.

== History ==
The principality was an appanage of Kievan Rus with its capital in Terebovlia. Its territories included parts of southeastern Galicia, Bukovina, and western Podolia. It bordered Principality of Kiev to the east, Zvenyhorod to the west, and parts of Volodymyr, Lutsk, and Peresopnytsia to the north.

Vasylko Rostyslavych extensively colonized the territories southeast of Terebovlia by employing Turkic peoples (Berendeys, Torks, and Pechenegs), and he annexed Ponyzia, thereby securing it against nomadic raiders. Halych gained importance as a political and economic center; other important cities and fortresses included Terebovlia, Mykulyn (now Mykulyntsi), Chern (now Chernivtsi), Vasyliv, Onut, Kuchelemyn, Bakota, Ushytsia, and Kalius. After Vasylko Rostyslavych died in 1124, Halych principality seceded, and by 1141 Terebovlia principality had become a part of the Principality of Galicia. After the Rostyslavych dynasty died out, it was briefly an appanage principality under Iziaslav Volodymyrovych.

== List of princes ==
- Vasylko Rostyslavych (1084–1124)
- Rostyslav-Hryhoriy Vasylkovich (1124–1141)
- Volodymyrko Volodarovych (1141-1153)
- Iziaslav Volodymyrovych (1210–1211)

== See also ==
- Council of Liubech
- Bibliography of Russian history
