= Of Galicia =

Toponymic epithet

Of Galicia or of Halych is a toponymic epithet associated with:

- the Principality of Galicia or the city Halych
- Galicia (Spain).

Notable people with this epithet include:

== Principality of Galicia ==
- Andrew of Galicia
- Andrew of Hungary, Prince of Galicia
- Boleslaus George II of Halych
- Boleslaw-Yury II of Galicia
- Constance of Hungary, Queen of Galicia
- Coloman of Galicia
- Daniel of Galicia
- Gryfina of Halych
- Kunigunda of Halych
- Leo I of Galicia
- Leo II of Galicia
- Maria of Galicia
- Yaroslav I of Halych
- King Yuri I of Galicia (1252–1308)
- Boleslaw-Yuri II of Galicia and Masovia (1308–1340)

== Galicia (Spain) ==
- Elvira Gonzalez of Galicia
- García I of Galicia
- García II of Galicia
- Sancho I of Galicia
- Sancho II of Galicia

== See also ==
- King of Galicia and Lodomeria
- List of princes of Galicia and Volhynia
- List of rulers of Galicia and Lodomeria
- List of Galician monarchs
