= History of Galicia (Eastern Europe) =

With the arrival of the Hungarians into the heart of the Central European Plain around 899, Slavic tribes of Vistulans, White Croats, and Lendians found themselves under Hungarian rule. In 955 those areas north of the Carpathian Mountains constituted an autonomous part of the Duchy of Bohemia and remained so until around 972, when the first Polish (western Polans) territorial claims began to emerge. This area was mentioned in 981 (by Nestor), when Vladimir the Great of Kievan Rus' claimed the area on his westward way. In the 11th century the area belonged to Poland (1018–1031 and 1069–1080), then reverted to Kievan Rus'. However, at the end of the 12th century the Hungarian claims to the principality turned up. Finally Casimir III of Poland annexed it in 1340–1349. Low Germans from Prussia and Middle Germany settled parts of northern and western Galicia from the 13th to 18th centuries, although the vast majority of the historic province remained independent from German and Austrian rule.

The territory was settled by the East Slavs in the Early Middle Ages and, in the 12th century, the Rurikid principality of Galicia was formed, and was merged at the end of the century with the neighboring principality of Volhynia into the Principality of Galicia–Volhynia that existed for the next century and half. By 1352, when the principality was partitioned between the Polish Kingdom and the Grand Duchy of Lithuania, most of Galicia belonged to the Polish Crown, where it still remained after the 1569 union between Poland and Lithuania. Upon the partition of the Polish-Lithuanian Commonwealth in 1772 the Kingdom of Galicia and Lodomeria, or simply Galicia, became the largest, most populous, and northernmost province of the Austrian Empire, where it remained until the dissolution of Austria-Hungary at the end of World War I in 1918.

== Tribal area ==
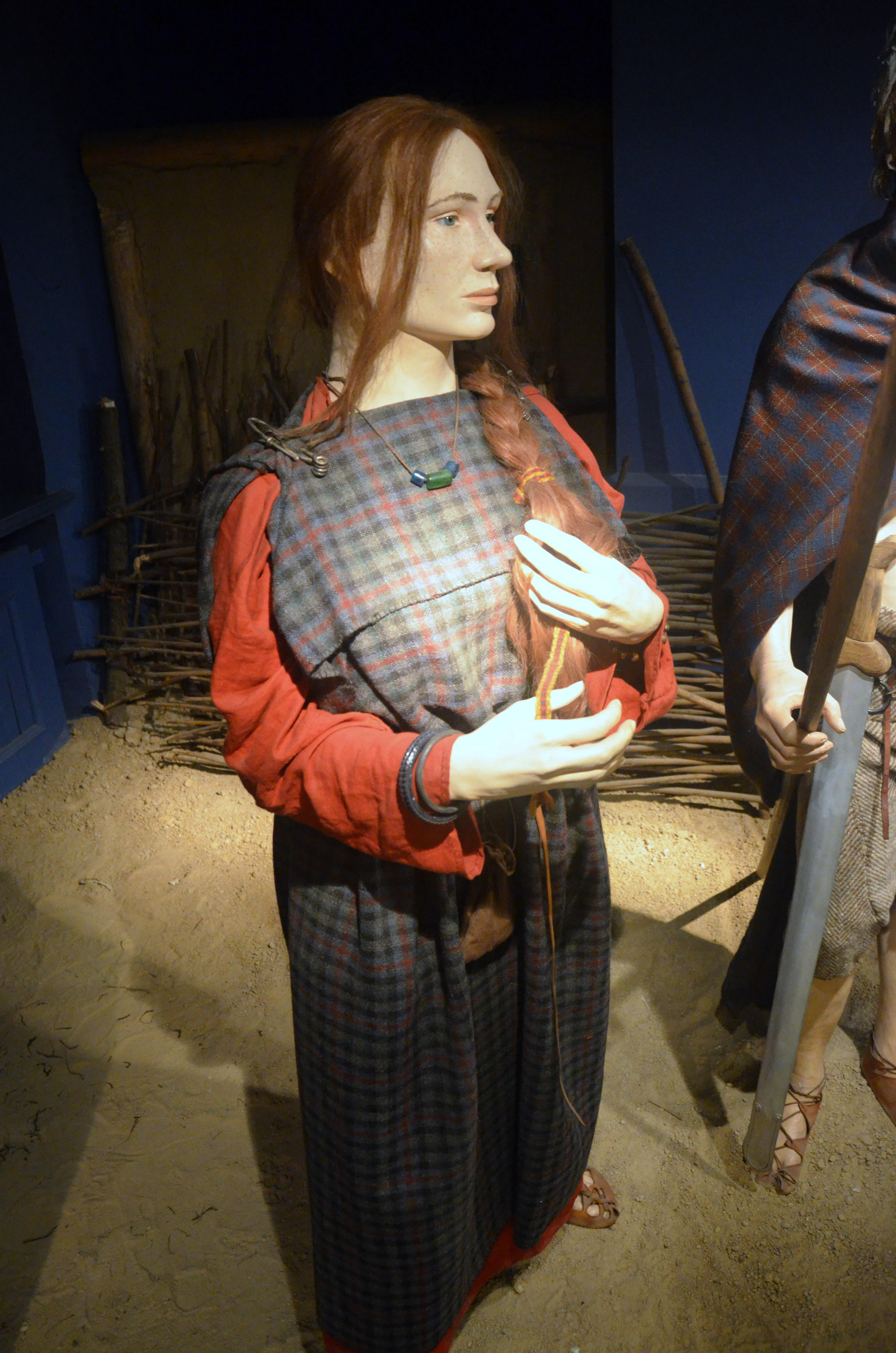
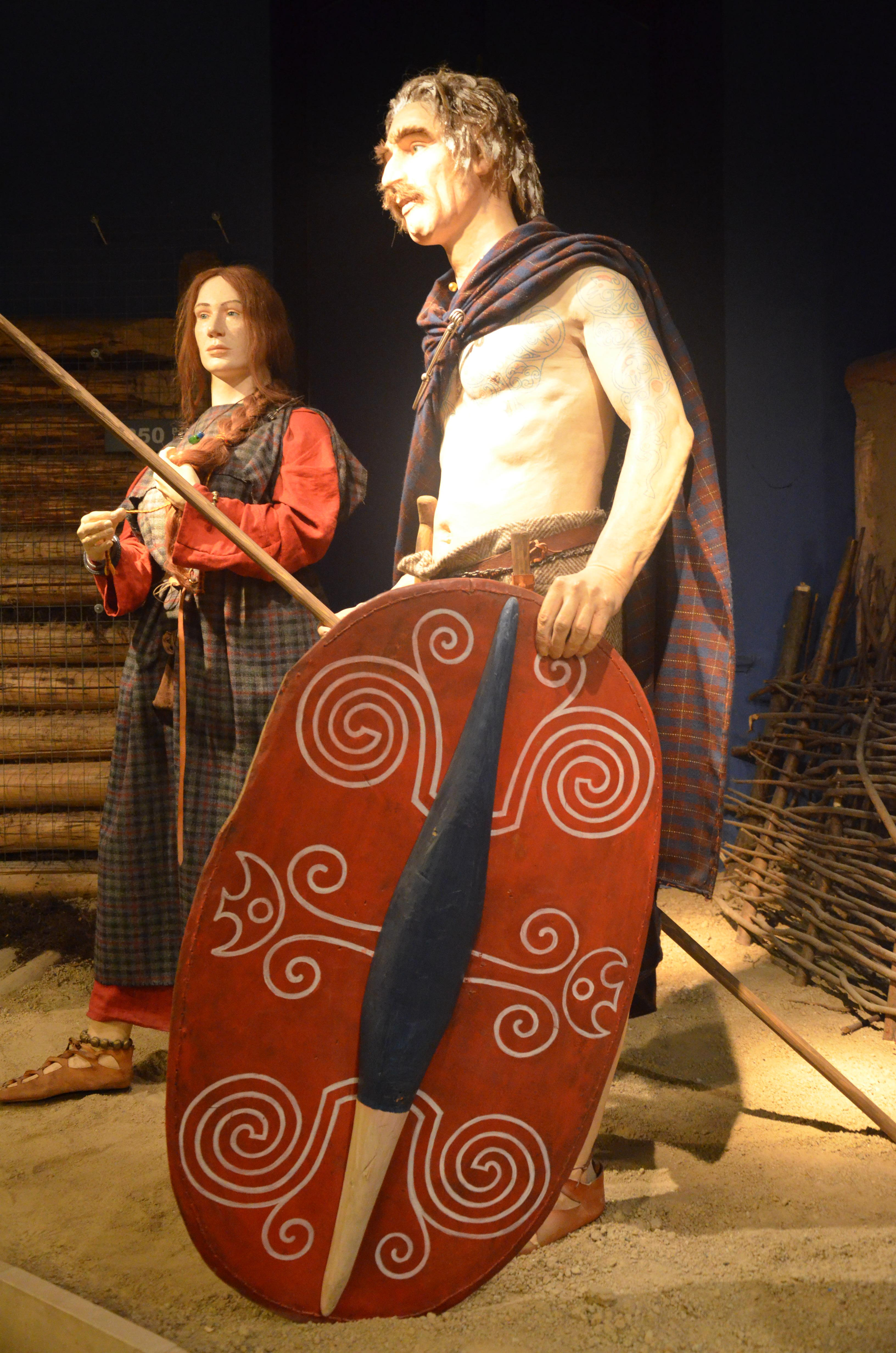
Celtic costumes par in Przeworsk culture (3rd century BC), Archaeological Museum of Kraków.
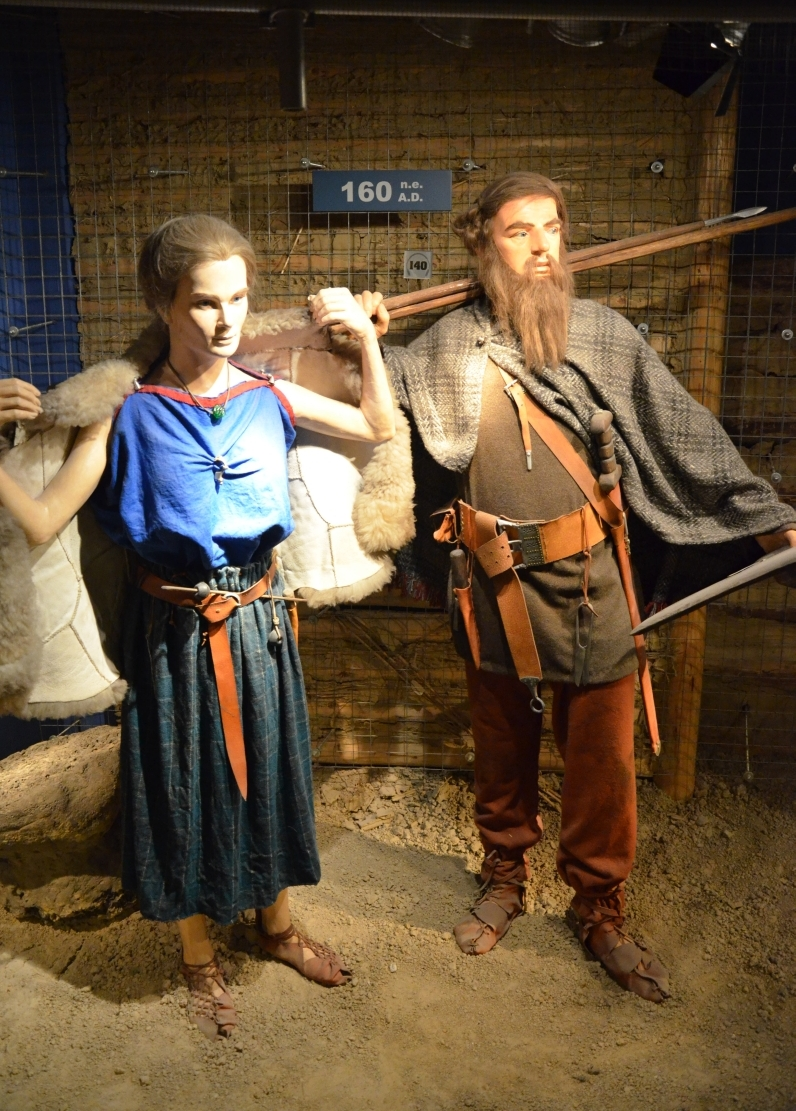
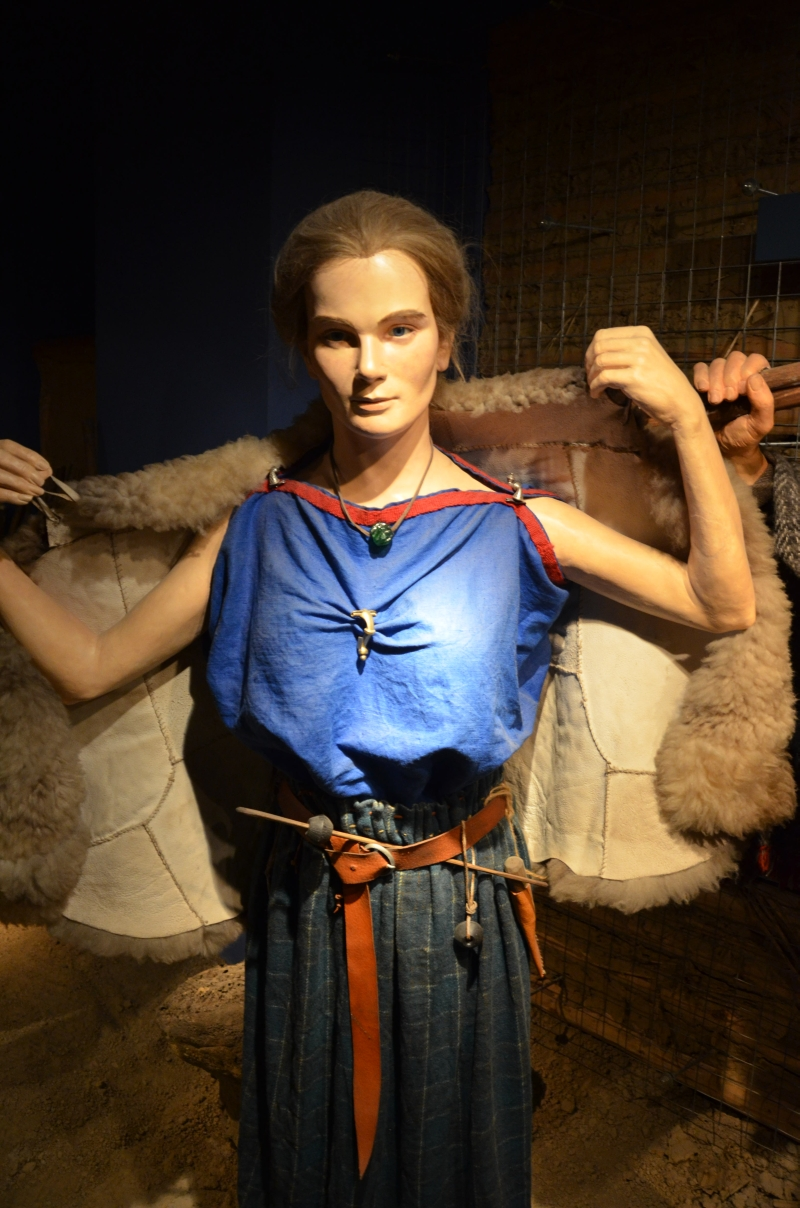
Germanic costumes par in Przeworsk culture (2nd century), Archaeological Museum of Kraków.

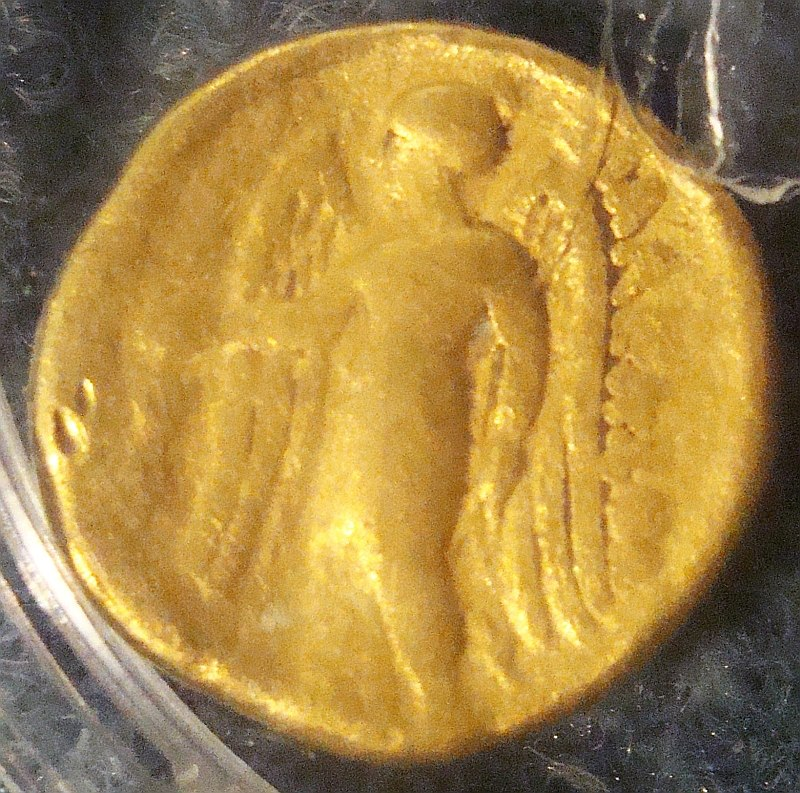
Stater coin, of Alexander the Great (336-323 BC) from Trepcza/ n. Sanok

The region has a turbulent history. In Roman times the region was populated by various tribes of Celto-Germanic admixture, including Celtic-based tribes – like the Galice or "Gaulics" and Bolihinii or "Volhynians" – the Lugians and Cotini of Celtic, Vandals and Goths of Germanic origins (the Przeworsk and Púchov cultures). Beginning with the Wandering of the nations, the great migration coincident with the fall of the Roman Empire, various groups of nomadic people invaded the area:

- 3rd century BC - 2nd century AD: Anartes (west part),
- 2nd – 5th centuries: Vandals (Przeworsk culture, =Hasdingi, Lacringi);Bastarnaes; Goths and Gepids (Wielbark culture)
- 2nd – 5th centuries (east part): Scythians, Sarmatians
- 4th – 5th centuries: Huns
- 5th century: Avars
- 6th – 8th centuries: Slavs
- 6th – 9th centuries (east part): Bulgars (later Slavicized), Hungarians, Pechenegs
- 10th – 13th centuries (east part): Cumans, Karaites
- 13th – 14th centuries (east part): Tatars and other Turco-Mongol peoples from Central Asia

Overall, Slavs (both West and East Slavs, including Lendians as well as Rusyns) came to dominate the Celtic-German population.

== Red Ruthenia ==
In 891–892, the territories of the White and Red Croats came under the control of Great Moravia, a Slavic state. The region of what later became known as Galicia appears to have been incorporated, in large part, into the Empire of Great Moravia. It is first attested in the Primary Chronicle in A.D. 981, when Vladimir the Great of Kievan Rus' took over the Red Ruthenian strongholds in his military campaign on the border with the land of the Lendians, incorporated into the Duchy of Polans, and the land of the White Croats, ruled by the Duchy of Bohemia.

In the following century, the area shifted briefly to Poland (1018–1031 and 1069–1080) and then back to Kievan Rus'. As one of many successors to Kievan Rus', the Principality of Galicia existed from 1087 until 1199, when Roman the Great finally managed to unite it with Volhynia in the state of Galicia–Volhynia. However, the Hungarian claims to the Ruthenian principality emerged in 1188. Despite the anti-Mongol campaigns of Daniel of Galicia, who was crowned the king of Galicia–Volhynia, his state occasionally paid tribute to the Golden Horde. Daniel moved his capital from Galicia to Kholm, and his son Leo moved it to Lviv. Daniel's dynasty also attempted to gain papal and broader support in Europe for an alliance against the Mongols, but proved incapable of competing with the rising powers of Great Duchy of Lithuania and Poland.

At the start of the 13th century, the king of Galicia–Volhynia, Roman Mstislavich, became the main military ally of the Byzantine Empire led by Alexios III, who referred to him as "igemon of Galicia". Roman also married Alexio's niece, the elder daughter of the overthrown emperor Isaak II. The relation with Byzantium helped to stabilize Galicia's relations with the Russian population of the Lower Dniester and the Lower Danube.

== 14th-century wars ==
A succession wars were fought in the years 1340–1392 concerning succession to the rule of the Principality of Galicia–Volhynia. After Boleslaw-Yuri II was poisoned by local nobles in 1340, both the Grand Duchy of Lithuania and the Kingdom of Poland advanced claims over the principality. After a prolonged conflict, Galicia–Volhynia was divided between Poland (Galicia) and Lithuania (Volhynia) and the principality ceased to exist as an independent state. Poland acquired a territory of approximately 52,000 square kilometres (20,000 sq mi) with 200,000 inhabitants.

== Galicia under the Polish-Lithuanian Commonwealth ==
After 1346, the region comprised a Polish possession divided into a number of voivodeships. This began an era of Polish settlement among the Ruthenian population. Armenian and Jewish immigration to the region also occurred in large numbers. Numerous castles were built during this time and some new cities were founded: Stanisławów (Stanyslaviv in Ukrainian, now Ivano-Frankivsk) and Krystynopol (now Chervonohrad).

Galicia was many times subjected to incursions by Tartars and Ottoman Turkey in the 16th and 17th centuries, devastated during the Khmelnytsky Uprising (1648–54) and the Russo-Polish War (1654–67), disrupted by Swedish invasions during The Deluge (1655–60) and Great Northern War of the early 18th century.

== Galicia ==
=== Princes ===
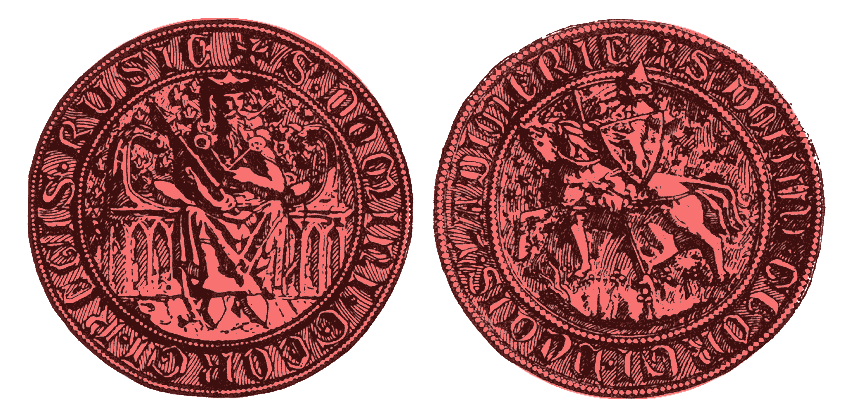
King's seal of Yuri I of Galicia(1301–1308) "S[igillum] Domini Georgi Regis Rusie", "S[igillum] Domini Georgi Ducis Ladimerie"

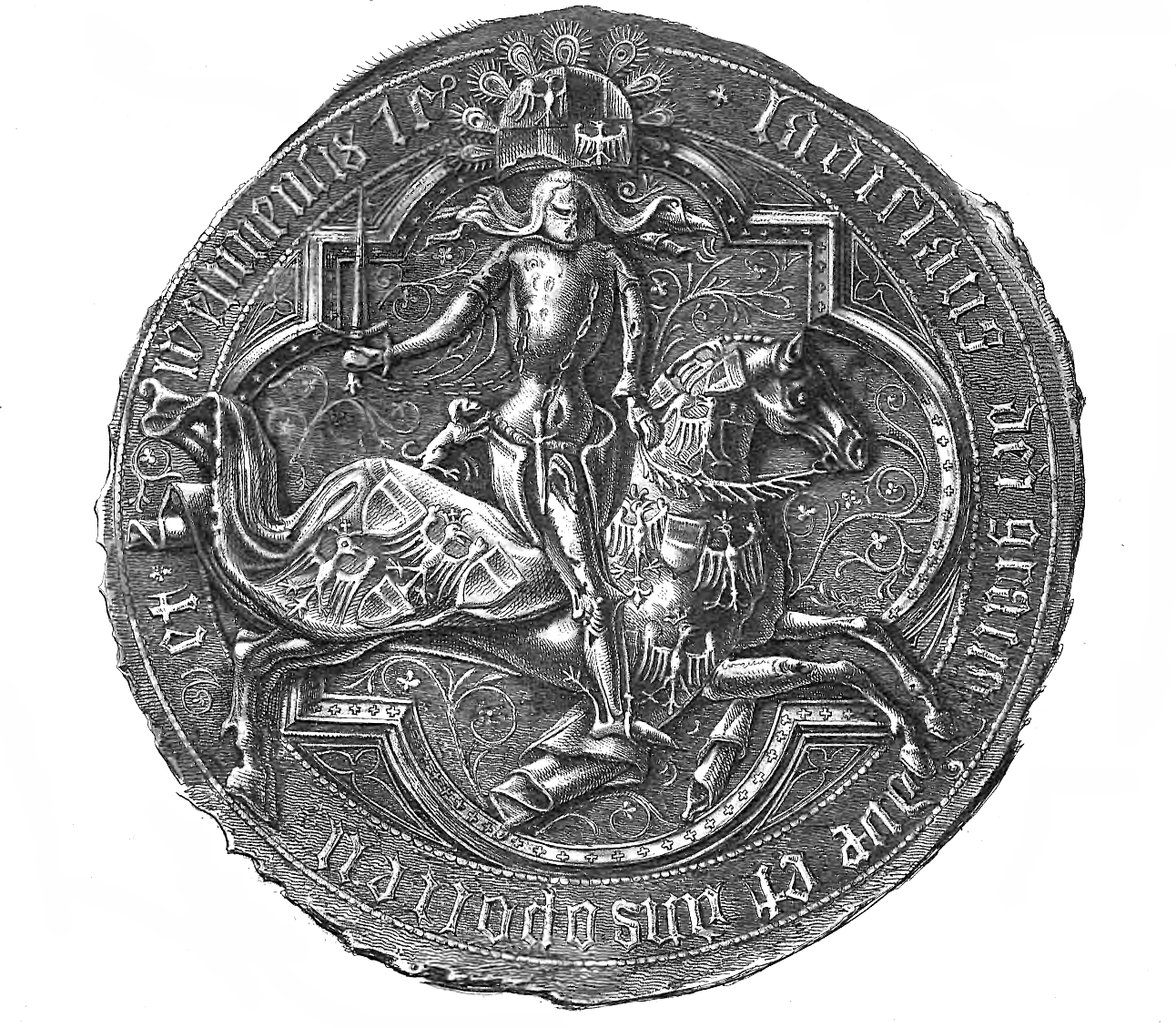
Władysław Opolczyk's duke seal, 1378

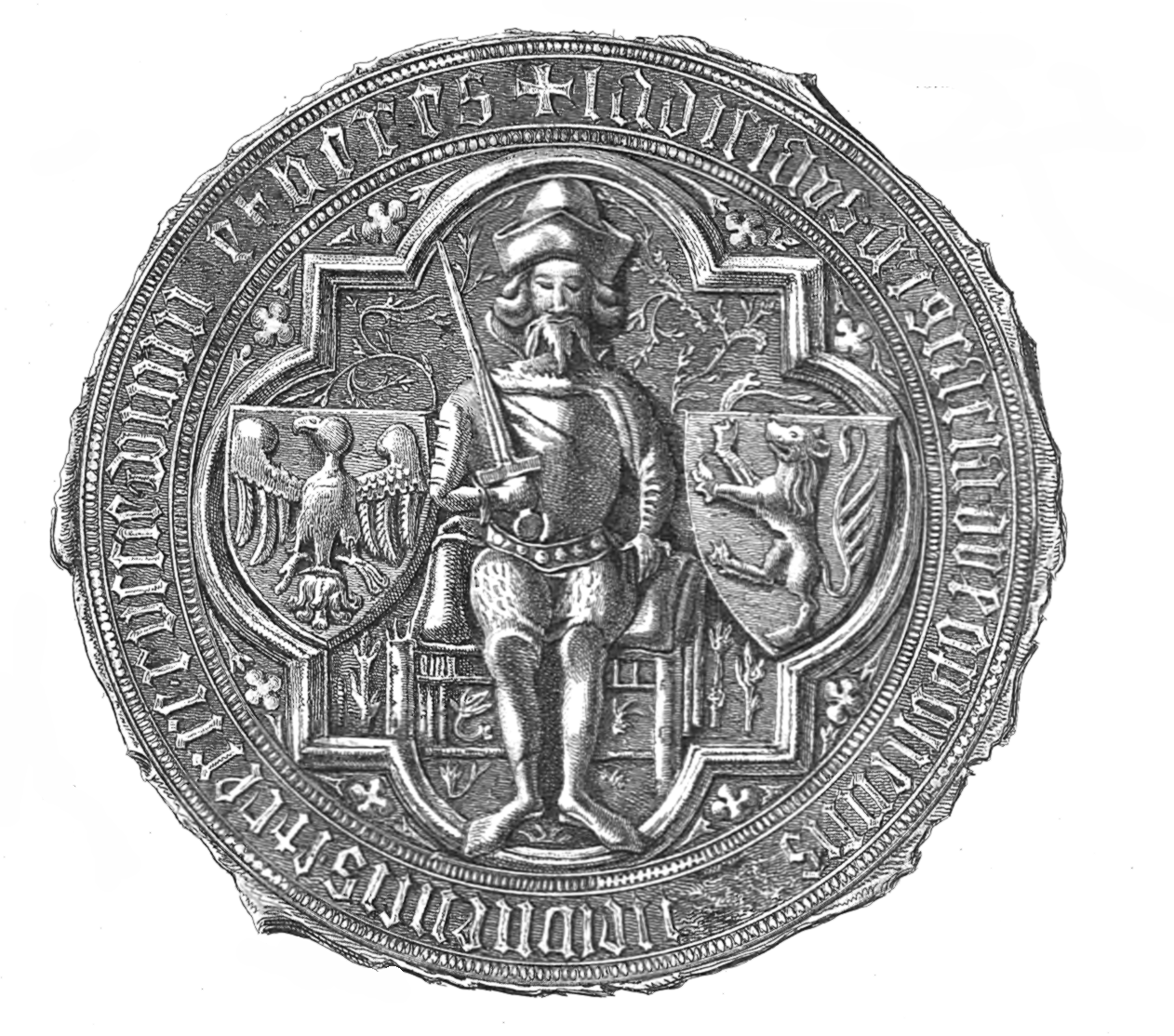
Władysław Opolczyk's duke seal "Ladislaus Dei Gracia Dux Opoliensis Wieloniensis et Terre Russie Domin et Heres" (~1387)
- Roman the Great, prince of Galicia–Volhynia (1199–1205) united Galicia and Volhynia into a single principality
- Daniel of Galicia, prince of Galicia–Volhynia (1211–1212, 1229–1235, 1238–1253), king of Galicia-Volhynia (1253–1264), moved the capital from Galicia to Kholm in 1240.
- Leo I of Galicia, prince of Galicia–Volhynia (1293–1301), moved the capital from Kholm to Lviv in 1272.
- Yuri I of Galicia, prince of Galicia–Volhynia (1301–1308)
- Andrew of Galicia and Leo II of Galicia, the last Ruthenian princes of Galicia–Volhynia (died 1323)
- Yuri II Boleslav, Mazovian-Ruthenian prince of Galicia–Volhynia (1323–1340), ruled with Maria, Andrew's and Leo's II sister.
- Liubartas, Lithuanian prince of Galicia (1340–1349) and prince of Volhynia (1323–1366), prince of eastern Volhynia (1366–1384).

After the death of Yuri II, Galicia was gradually annexed by the Kingdom of Poland, between 1340 and 1366, during the reign of Casimir III of Poland.

=== Kings ===
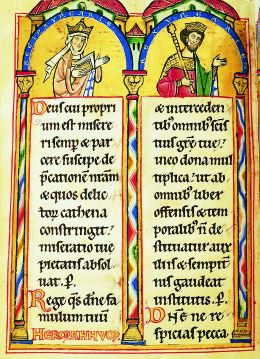
King Andrew II of Hungary with queen Gertrude von Andechs-Meranien

- Andrew II of Hungary, the son of Béla III of Hungary, the first nominal king of Galicia who, as a Hungarian prince, reigned from 1188 to 1190.
- Coloman of Galicia-Lodomeria (Kálmán), the first king of Galicia and Lodomeria, Lat. Rex Galiciae et Lodomeriae (1215–1219) and his wife Salomea of Poland, Reges Galiciae et Lodomeriae
- Andrew (András), the younger brother of Coloman, Hungarian prince, king of Galicia and Lodomeria (1219–1221)
- Protectorate by White Horde of Khans (1245–1338)
  - Daniel of Galicia (Daniel of Galicia), the first Ruthenian king of Galicia–Volhynia (1253–1264), crowned by a papal legat, archbishop Opizo in Dorohychyn in 1253
- Casimir III the Great, King of Poland (1333–1370), incorporated Galicia to Poland in the period of 1344–1366
  - Dmitry Detko, Ruthenian boyar, starost of Galicia, under the overlordship of the Polish king, (1341–1344)
- Louis I of Hungary, King of Hungary (1342–1382), King of Poland (1370–1382), incorporated Galicia to Hungary
  - Władysław Opolczyk, Silesian prince, Hungarian count palatine, Governor of Galicia (1372–1378)
  - Emeric I Bebek (Bebek Imre), Hungarian Governor of Galicia (1378–1386)
  - Benedek, Hungarian Starost of Galicia (1386–1387)
- Kings of Poland 1387–1569
- Kings of Polish-Lithuanian Commonwealth 1569–1772
- Maria Theresa of Austria Holy Roman Empress 1772–1780
- Joseph II, Holy Roman Emperor 1780–1790
- Leopold II, Holy Roman Emperor 1790–1792
- Francis II, Holy Roman Emperor 1792–1835
- Ferdinand I of Austria 1835–1848
- Franz Joseph I of Austria 1848–1916
- Charles I of Austria 1916–1918

=== Partitions of Poland to the Congress of Vienna ===
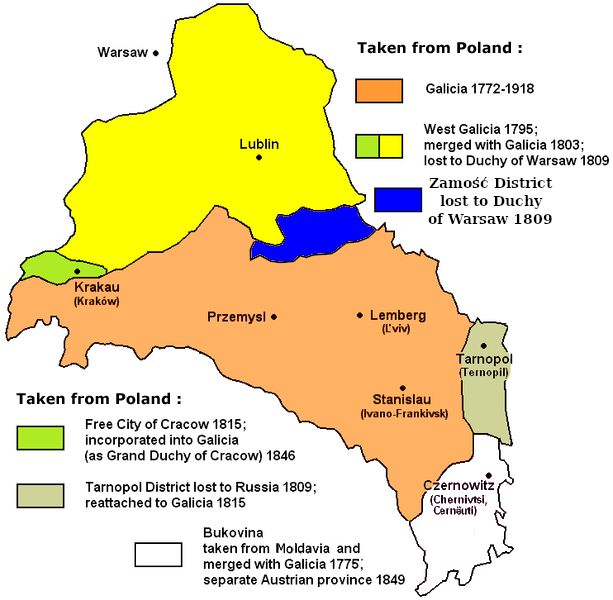
Territorial changes of Galicia, 1772–1918

Galicia and its division into East Galicia and West Galicia in the 18th century

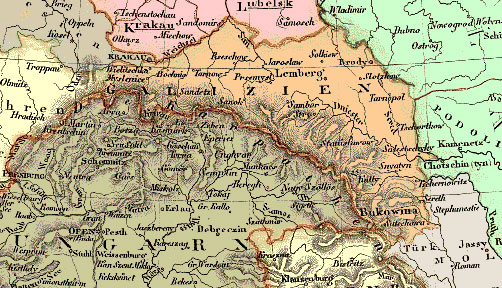
Map of Galicia in 1836

In 1772, Galicia was the largest part of the area annexed by the Habsburg monarchy in the First Partition of Poland. All annexed territories were organized as the Kingdom of Galicia and Lodomeria, in order to underline traditional Hungarian claims to the region. However, a large portion of non-galician and ethnically Polish lands to the west was also incorporated by the same annexation, and added to the province, which changed the geographical reference of the term Galicia, expanding it much to the west. Lviv (Lemberg, Lwów) served as capital of Austrian Galicia, which was dominated by the Polish aristocracy, despite the fact that the population of the eastern half of the province was mostly Ukrainian (or Ruthenian, as they were known at the time). In addition to the Polish aristocracy and gentry who inhabited almost all parts of Galicia, and the Ruthenians in the east, there existed a large Jewish population, also more heavily concentrated in the eastern parts of the province.

The newly arrived Austrians were shocked by the relationships between nobles and peasants in the former Polish territory. The peasants were seen, by the Austrians, as being treated as slaves over whom the nobles had limitless power, and examples of the nobles' alleged barbarism and "wildness", described with "artistic liberty", were distributed in the Austrian press and pamphlets in order to legitimize Habsburg regime in Galicia. The new Habsburg rulers and their supporters thus portrayed themselves as civilizing those whom they described as the savage Polish nobility. Blaming the Polish nobility for Galicia's economic backwardness, the Austrian rulers brought in Austrian Germans and Germanized Czechs to reform the province; until 1849 no native Galician was appointed vice-governor. In 1786, Polish laws were abolished and Austrian code introduced instead; all levels of administration were staffed by German speakers, while major urban centers (Lviv, Cracow, Przemyśl) were filled with Austrian soldiers. During these first decades of Austrian rule, while Galicia was firmly governed from Vienna, many significant reforms were carried out by a bureaucracy. The aristocracy was guaranteed its rights, but these rights were considerably circumscribed. The former serfs were no longer mere chattel, but became subjects of law and were granted certain personal freedoms, such as the right to marry without the lord's permission. Their labour obligations were defined and limited, and they could bypass the lords and appeal to the imperial courts for justice. The Eastern Rite "Uniate" Church, which primarily served the Ruthenians, was renamed the Greek Catholic Church to bring it onto a par with the Roman Catholic Church; it was given seminaries, and eventually, a Metropolitan. Although unpopular with the aristocracy, among the common folk, Polish and Ukrainian/Ruthenian alike, these reforms created a reservoir of good will toward the emperor which lasted almost to the end of Austrian rule. At the same time, however, Austria extracted from Galicia considerable wealth and conscripted large numbers of the peasant population into its armed services.

In 1795, after the Third Partition of Poland, newly annexed polish territory was named "West Galicia" in order to legitimize the annexation. That area was lost in 1809, by the Treaty of Schönbrunn.

=== 1815 to 1860 ===
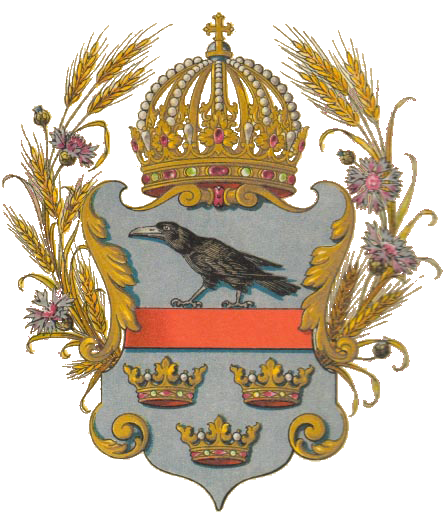
Coat-of-arms of the Kingdom of Galicia and Lodomeria in the 19th century.

In 1815, as a result of decisions of the Congress of Vienna, the Lublin area and surrounding regions were ceded by Austria to the Congress Kingdom of Poland which was ruled by the Tsar, and the Ternopil Region, including the historical region of Southern Podolia (Podillya), was returned to Austria from Russia, which had held it since 1809.

The 1820s and 1830s were a period of absolutist rule from Vienna, the local Galician bureaucracy still being filled by Germans and Germanized Czechs, although some of their children were already becoming Polonized. After the failure of the November insurrection in Russian Poland in 1830–31, in which a few thousand Galician volunteers participated, many Polish refugees arrived in Galicia. The latter 1830s were rife with Polish conspiratorial organizations, whose work culminated in the unsuccessful Galician insurrection of 1846, easily put down by the Austrians with the help of the Galician peasantry, which remained loyal to the emperor.

This insurrection only occurred in the western, Polish-populated, part of Galicia, and the conflict was between patriotic, noble, rebels, and unsympathetic Polish peasants. In 1846, as one of the results of this unsuccessful revolt, the former Polish capital city of Kraków, which had been a free city and a republic, became a part of Galicia, administered from Lviv (Lemberg).

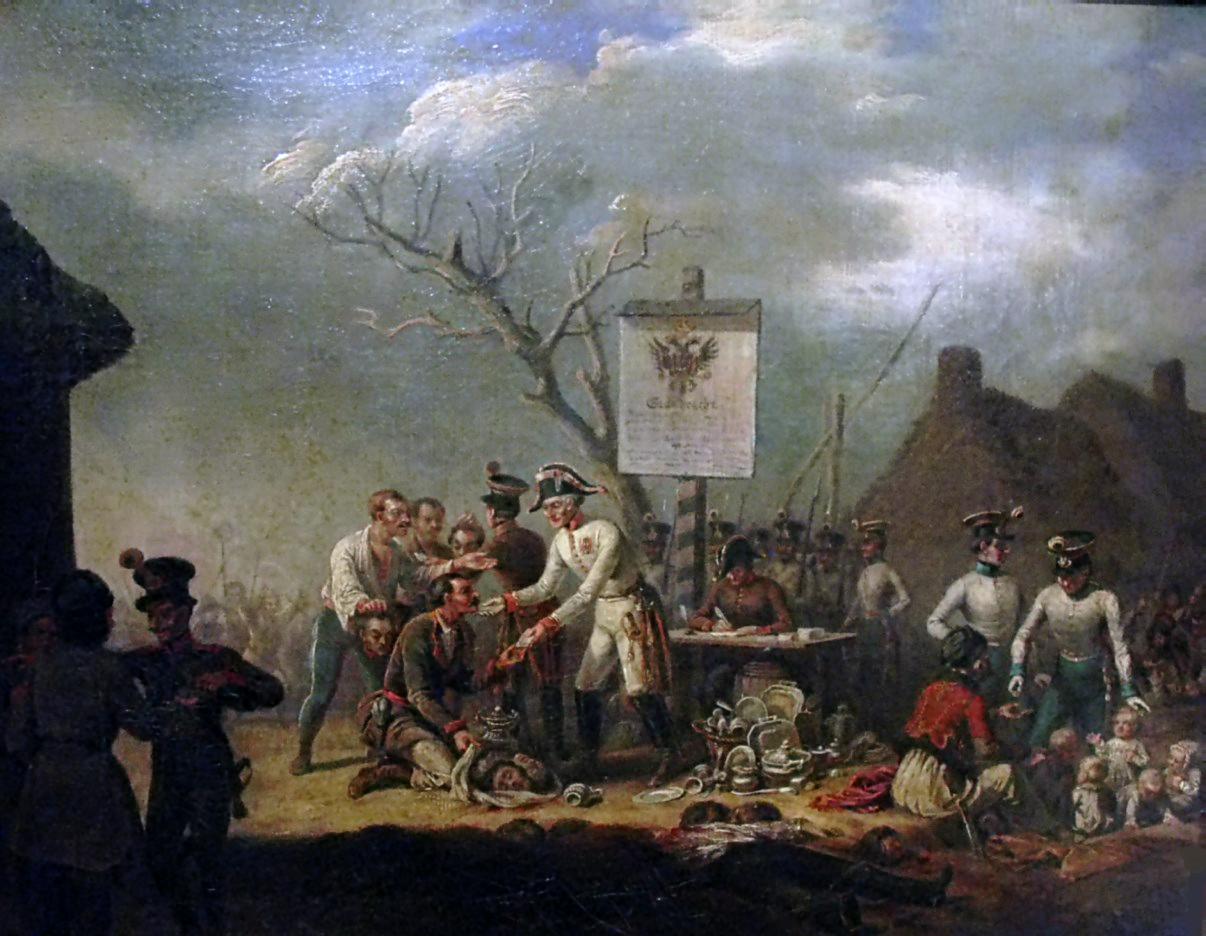
The Galician Peasant Uprising of 1846, the largest peasant uprising against szlachta rulership on Polish lands in the 19th century.

In the 1830s, in the eastern part of Galicia, the beginnings of a national awakening occurred among the Ruthenians. A circle of activists, primarily Greek Catholic seminarians, affected by the romantic movement in Europe and the example of fellow Slavs elsewhere, especially in eastern Ukraine under the Russians, began to turn their attention to the common folk and their language. In 1837, the so-called Ruthenian Triad (Markiyan Shashkevych, Yakiv Holovatsky, and Ivan Vahylevych) published "Русалка Днѣстровая", Rusalka dnistrova ("The Mermaid of the Dnister"), a collection of folksongs and other materials in the common Ruthenian tongue. Alarmed by such democratism, the Austrian authorities and the Greek Catholic Metropolitan banned the book.

Flag of Galicia (1849)

Flag of Galicia (1890—1918)

In 1848, revolutions occurred in Vienna and other parts of the Austrian Empire. When an uprising inspired by Polish revolutionists took place in Kraków, Galician peasants rebelled against the landowners, thus becoming allies of the Austrian government. In the "Galician slaughter" more than 2,000 Polish landowners and members of their families were killed. In some districts, for example in Tarnow, almost 90 percent of the estates were looted and burned.

The Habsburg government was trying to prevent Galicia's turning into a "Polish Piedmont", from where the restoration of an independent Polish state could begin; using national and social controversies in Galicia, it started to encourage the Rusyn movement, which was later called “Ukrainian Piedmont”. In his work Ukraine: the history, Ukrainian-Canadian historian Orest Subtelnyi argues that Galician governor Franz Stadion “actively attracted and supported...the timid elite of Western Ukraine, hoping to use it as a counterbalance against more aggressive Poles”. Under his guidance, the Main Rusyn Rada was created, and in Lviv a newspaper “The Dawn of Galicia” was founded.

On May 15, 1848, this newspaper published an address of Main Rusyn Rada containing demands for administrative autonomy and free development of national culture and language for Galician Rusyns, “a part of the great Rusyn people which speaks a single language and amounts to 15 million people”. It was the first document to express the idea of unity between the population of Habsburg monarchy and Ruthenia, a part of the Russian Empire. But leaders of Main Rusyn Rada actively pointed out that Galicia was inhabited by the Rusyn – “Ruthenen” – a people different from the Russians – “Russen” – as well as from Poles; and that it were the Rusyns who were the backbone of Austria-Hungary in the province.

A decade of renewed absolutism followed, but to placate the Poles, Count Agenor Goluchowski, a conservative representative of the eastern Galician aristocracy, the so-called Podolians, was appointed Viceroy. He began to Polonize the local administration and managed to have Ruthenian ideas of partitioning the province shelved. He was unsuccessful, however, in forcing the Greek Catholic Church to shift to the use of the western or Gregorian calendar, or among Ruthenians generally, to replace Cyrillic script with the Latin alphabet.

== Constitutional experiments ==
In 1859, following Austrian military defeat in Italy, the Empire entered a period of constitutional experiments. In 1860, the Vienna Government, influenced by Agenor Goluchowski, issued its October Diploma, which envisioned a conservative federalization of the empire, but a negative reaction in the German-speaking lands led to changes in government and the issuing of the February Patent which watered down this de-centralization. Nevertheless, by 1861, Galicia was granted a Legislative Assembly or Galicia Diet. Although at first pro-Habsburg Ruthenian and Polish peasant representation was considerable in this body (about half the assembly), and the pressing social and Ruthenian questions were discussed, administrative pressures limited the effectiveness of both peasant and Ruthenian representatives and the Diet became dominated by the Polish aristocracy and gentry, who favoured further autonomy. This same year, disturbances broke out in Russian Poland and to some extent spilled over into Galicia. The Diet ceased to sit.

By 1863, open revolt broke out in Russian Poland and, from 1864 to 1865, the Austrian government declared a State of Siege in Galicia, temporarily suspending civil liberties.

1865 brought a return to federal ideas along the lines suggested by Agenor Goluchowski and negotiations on autonomy between the Polish aristocracy and Vienna began once again.

Meanwhile, the Ruthenians felt more and more abandoned by Vienna and among the "Old Ruthenians" grouped around the Greek Catholic Cathedral of Saint George, there occurred a turn towards Russia. The more extreme supporters of this orientation came to be known as "Russophiles". At the same time, influenced by the Ukrainian language poetry of the eastern Ukrainian writer, Taras Shevchenko, a Ukrainophile movement led by Anatole Vakhnianyn and the Prosvita society arose which published literature in the Ukrainian/Ruthenian vernacular and eventually established a network of reading halls. Supporters of this orientation came to be known as "Populists", and later, simply as "Ukrainians". Almost all Ruthenians, however, still hoped for national equality and for an administrative division of Galicia along ethnic lines.

== Period of increasing Galician autonomy (1867–1914) ==
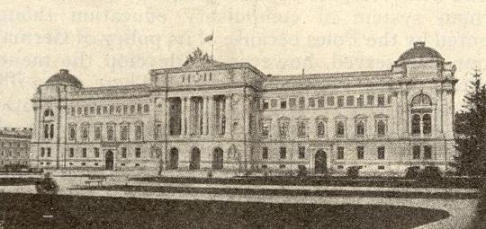
Galician Sejm (parliament) in Lviv.

In 1866, following the Battle of Sadova (Königgrätz) and the defeat of Austria in the Austro-Prussian War of 1866, the Austrian empire began to experience increased internal problems. In an effort to shore up support for the Habsburg monarchy, Emperor Franz Joseph I (r. 1848–1916) began negotiations for a compromise with the Hungarian nobility to ensure their support. Some members of the Imperial government, such as Austrian prime minister Count Belcredi, advised the Emperor to make a more comprehensive constitutional deal with all of the nationalities - a proposal that would have set up a federal structure. Belcredi worried that an accommodation with the Hungarian interests would alienate the other nationalities. However, Franz Joseph was unable to ignore the power of the Hungarian nobility, and they would not accept anything less than dualism between themselves and the traditional Austrian élites.

Finally, after the so-called Ausgleich of February 1867, the Austrian Empire was reformed into a dualist Austria-Hungary. Although the Polish and Czech plans for their national areas to be included in the federal structure failed, a slow yet steady process of liberalisation of Austrian rule in Galicia started. Representatives of the Polish aristocracy and intelligentsia addressed the Emperor asking for greater autonomy for Galicia. Their demands were not accepted outright, but over the course of the next several years a number of significant concessions were made toward the establishment of Galician autonomy.

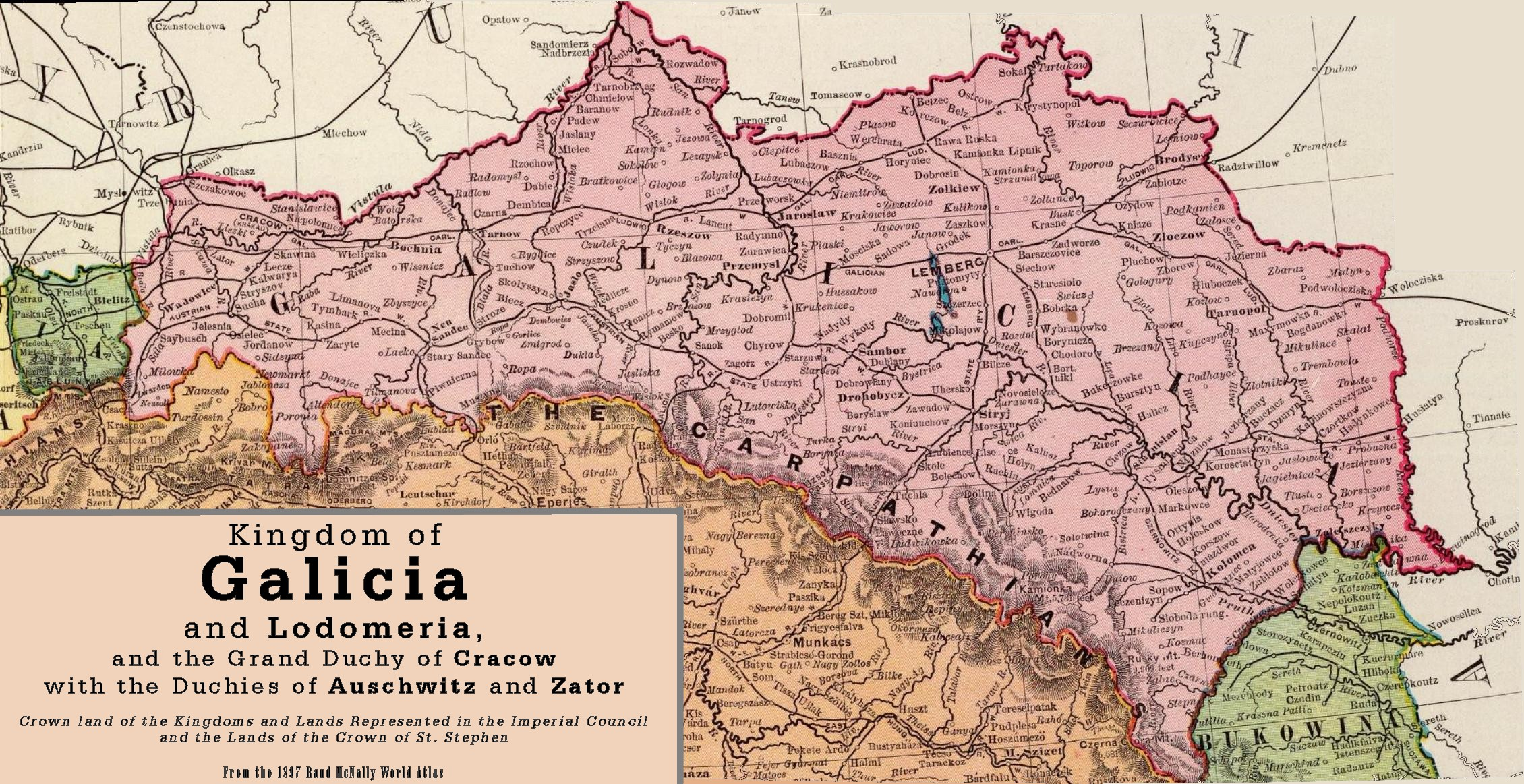
Galicia in 1897

In 1873, Galicia became de facto an autonomous province of Austria-Hungary with Polish and (to a much lesser degree) Ukrainian or Ruthenian as official languages. The Germanisation had been halted and the censorship lifted as well. Galicia formed part of the Austrian part (Cisleithania) of the Dual Monarchy, but the Galicia Diet and provincial administration had extensive privileges and prerogatives, especially in education, culture, and local affairs.

These changes were supported by many Polish intellectuals. In 1869, a group of young conservative publicists in Kraków, including Józef Szujski, Stanisław Tarnowski, Stanisław Koźmian and Ludwik Wodzicki, published a series of satirical pamphlets entitled Teka Stańczyka (Stańczyk's Portfolio). Only five years after the tragic end of the Polish January Uprising of 1863-1864 against the Russian Empire, the pamphlets ridiculed the idea of armed national uprisings and suggested compromise with Poland's enemies (especially with the Austrian Empire), concentration on economic growth, and acceptance of the political concessions offered by Vienna. This political grouping came to be known as the Stanczyks or Kraków Conservatives. Together with the eastern Galician conservative Polish landowners and aristocracy called the "Podolians", they gained a political ascendency in Galicia which lasted to 1914.

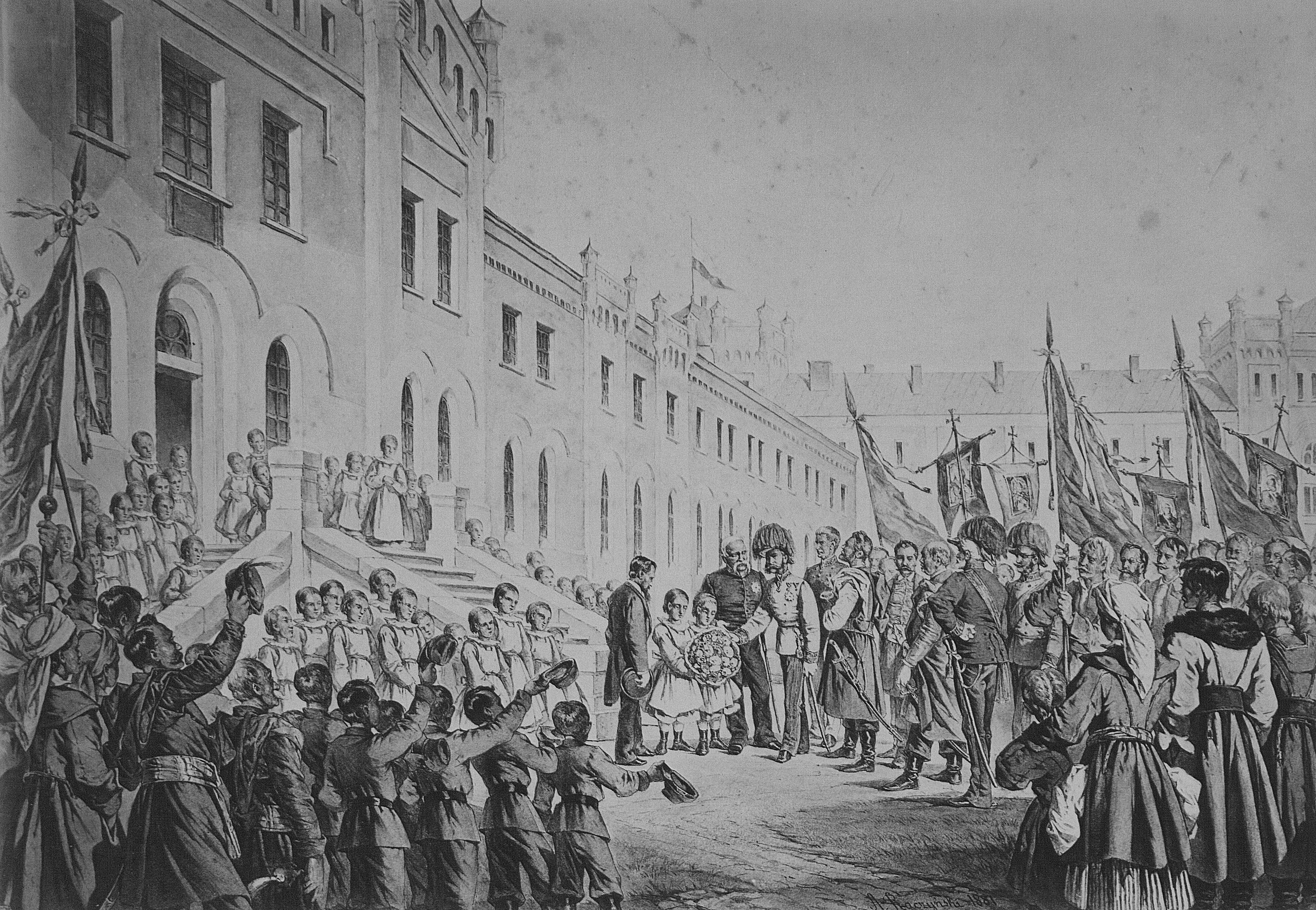
Emperor Franz Joseph I of Austria in Galicia, 1880

The shift in power from Vienna to the Polish landowning class was not welcomed by the Ruthenians, who became more sharply divided into Russophiles (who looked to Russia for salvation) and Ukrainians (Ukrainophiles, who stressed their connections to the common people).

Both Vienna and the Poles saw treason among the Russophiles, and a series of political trials during the 1880s had the effect of discrediting them. By 1890, an agreement was worked out between the Poles and the "Populist" Ruthenians or Ukrainians which saw the partial Ukrainianization of the school system in eastern Galicia and other concessions to Ukrainian culture. Thereafter, the Ukrainian national movement spread rapidly among the Ruthenian peasantry and, despite repeated setbacks, by the early years of the 20th century this movement had almost completely replaced other Ruthenian groups as the main rival for power with the Poles. Throughout this period, the Ukrainians never gave up the traditional Ruthenian demands for national equality and for partition of the Galician province into a western (Polish) half and an eastern (Ukrainian) half.

== Economic emigration ==
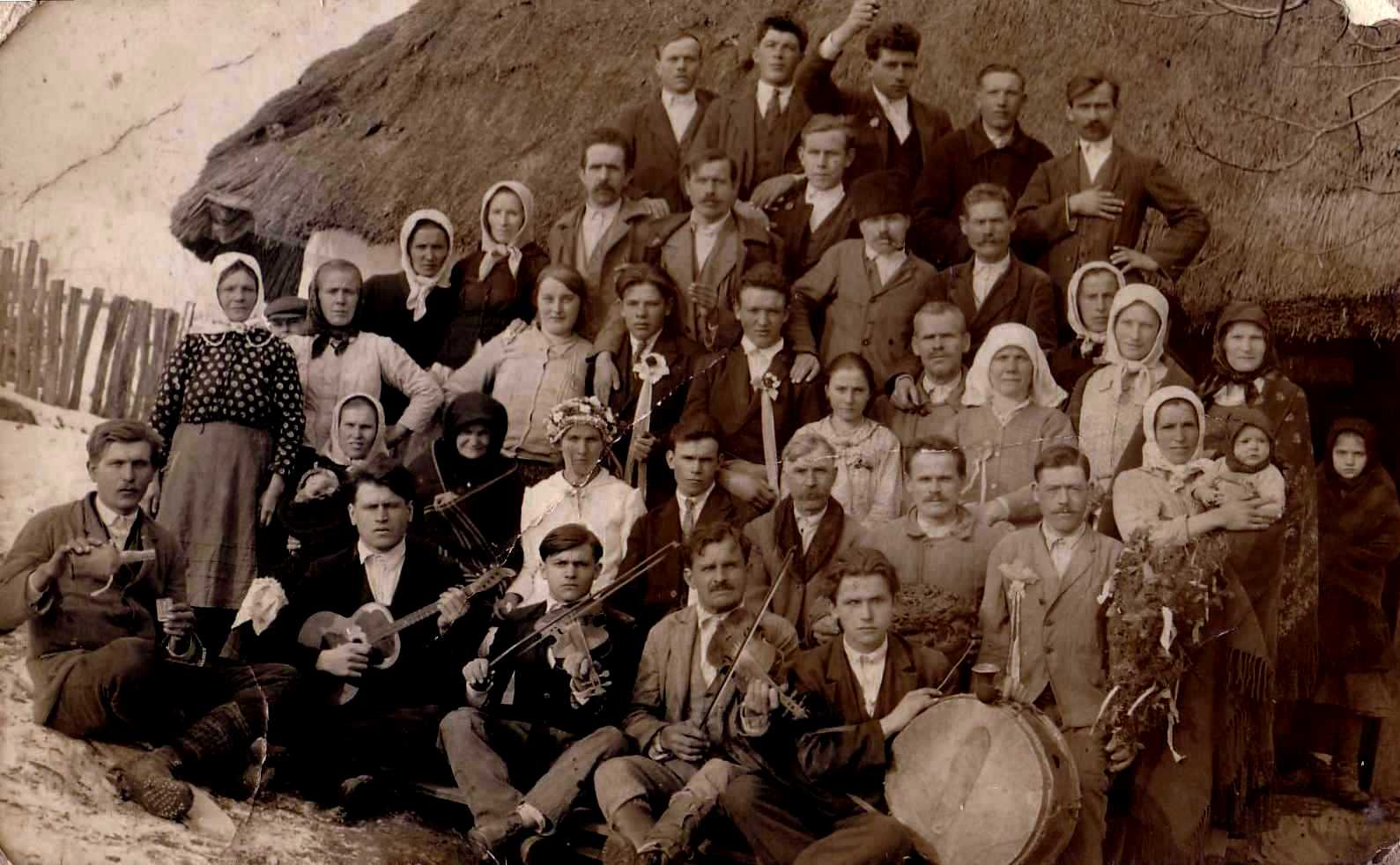
Economic immigrants from Galicia in the Austro-Hungarian Monarchy 1890, modern Prnjavor (today part of Bosnia and Herzegovina).

Beginning in the 1880s, a mass emigration of the Galician peasantry occurred. The emigration started as a seasonal one to Imperial Germany (newly unified and economically dynamic) and to Bosnia and then later became a Trans-Atlantic one with large-scale emigration to the United States, Brazil, and Canada.

Caused by the backward economic condition of Galicia where rural poverty was widespread, the emigration began in the western, Polish populated part of Galicia and quickly shifted east to the Ukrainian inhabited parts. Poles, Ukrainians, Jews, and Germans all participated in this mass movement of countryfolk and villagers. Poles migrated principally to New England and the midwestern states of the United States, but also to Brazil and elsewhere; Ukrainians migrated to Brazil, Canada, and the United States, with a very intense emigration from Southern Podolia to Western Canada; and Jews emigrated both directly to the New World and also indirectly via other parts of Austria-Hungary.

A total of several hundred thousand people were involved in this Great Economic Emigration which grew steadily more intense until the outbreak of the First World War in 1914. The war put a temporary halt to the emigration which never again reached the same proportions.

The Great Economic Emigration, especially the emigration to Brazil – the "Brazilian Fever" as it was called at the time – was described in contemporary literary works by the Polish poet Maria Konopnicka, the Ukrainian writer Ivan Franko, and many others. Writer Osyp Oleskiv was instrumental in redirecting Ukrainian migration away from Brazil towards Canada, although the first arrival, Ivan Pylypiv, had been a few years earlier.

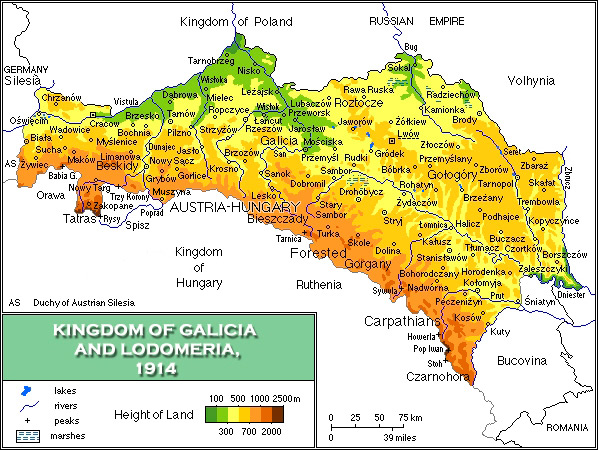
Kingdom of Galicia 1846–1918

== First World War and Polish–Ukrainian conflict ==
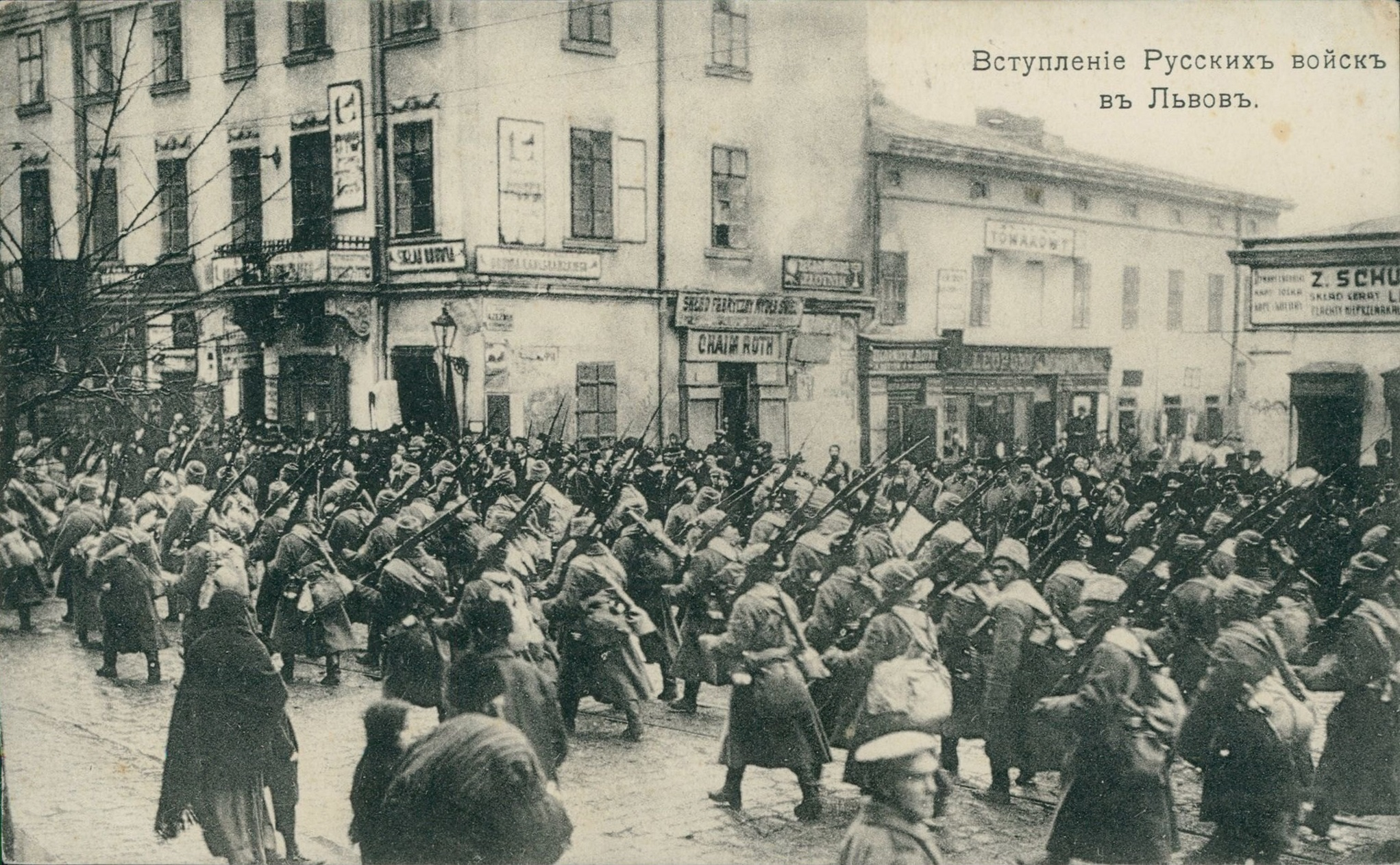
Entry of Russian troops into Lviv in 1914

During the First World War, Galicia saw heavy fighting between the forces of Russia and the Central Powers. The fighting began in 1914 when the Russian Army advanced into the Austro-Hungarian province of Galicia and German East Prussia. The initial attack on East Prussia quickly turned into a defeat following the Battle of Tannenberg in August 1914 but the second incursion was completely successful. Under the command of generals Nikolai Ivanov and Aleksei Brusilov, the Russians won the Battle of Galicia in September and began the Siege of Przemyśl, the next fortress on the road towards Kraków. By the end December 1914, the Russians controlled almost all of Galicia. However, the victory was short-lived; the Russians were pushed out of Galicia in the spring and summer of 1915 by a combined German, Austro-Hungarian and Turkish offensive.

In 1918, Western Galicia became a part of the restored Republic of Poland, while the local Ukrainian population briefly declared the independence of Eastern Galicia as the West Ukrainian People's Republic. These competing claims led to the Polish-Ukrainian War. Upon reclaiming its former territories and perceiving a much greater threat from a Communist Russia, Poland made common cause with the Ukrainian administration in Kiev, the Ukrainian People's Republic, against Soviet Russia. During the Polish-Soviet War, a short-lived Galician SSR in Ternopil was established. Eventually, the whole of the province was recaptured by Poland and divided into four voivodeships, with capitals in Kraków, Lviv (Lwów), Ternopil (Tarnopol) and Stanyslaviv (Stanisławów).

The Ukrainians of the former eastern Galicia and the neighbouring province of Volhynia made up about 15% of the Second Polish Republic's population, and were its numerically largest minority. Poland's annexation of Eastern Galicia, never accepted as legitimate by most Ukrainians, was internationally recognized in 1923. This attitude, among other local problems, contributed to growing tensions between the Polish government and the Ukrainian population, eventually giving the rise to the militant underground Organization of Ukrainian Nationalists.

In the western part of Galicia, Rusyn Lemkos formed the Lemko-Rusyn Republic in 1918, initially attempting to unite with Russia, instead of Ukraine. As this was impossible, they later attempted to unite with Rusyns from the area south of the Carpathians, in an attempt to join Czechoslovakia as a third ethnic entity. This effort was suppressed by the Polish government in 1920, and the area was incorporated into Poland. The leaders of the republic were subsequently tried by the Polish government; they were later acquitted.

== Second World War and Distrikt Galizien ==
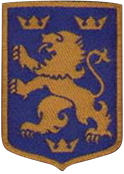
The emblem of 14th SS-Volunteer Division "Galicia".

In 1939 the Supreme Command of the Wehrmacht approved a plan (Fall Weiss) with details of future attack on Poland. In the plan, military brigades from Galicia played the role of a Fifth column, to attack and demoralize the Polish Army in the rear, if resistance from Polish troops were stronger than expected. In early summer of 1939, Germans (Wilhelm Canaris, Erwin von Lahousen), with the support of activists from OUN (Richard Yary), created a Ukrainian Legion under command of Roman Sushko, that had training camps in Germany, Austria (St. Egyden am Steinfeld, Kirchhoff) and Slovakia. With the help of the Ukrainian Legion, German intelligence Abwehr planned, after the defeat of Poland, to create a pro-German Ukrainian state in Galicia and Volhynia. From intelligence reports, the USSR was aware of these plans and actively tried to counteract them in diplomatic negotiations. Finally, in the immediate diplomatic prelude to the Second World War, the Molotov–Ribbentrop pact was signed, which divided Poland roughly along the Curzon line. According to its terms, Germany had to scrap its original plan for the Ukrainian Legion. After September 17, 1939, all territory east of the San, Bug and Neman rivers, approximating the former territory of East Galicia, was occupied and annexed by the USSR. This territory was divided into four administrative districts (oblasts): Lviv, Stanislav, Drohobych and Ternopil (the latter including parts of Volhynia) of the Soviet Republic of Ukraine.

Jews who did not adopt Soviet citizenship were deported to Siberia and northeastern European Russia.

In 1940–1941, the Soviet authorities conducted four mass deportations from the eastern part of the Second Polish Republic, inhabited by Ukrainians, Belarusians, Jews, Lithuanians, Russians, Germans, Czechs, and Armenians, along with Poles. Approximately 335,000 Polish citizens were deported to Siberia, Kazakhstan, and the north-east of European Russia, by the NKVD. According to general Vasily Khristoforov, the director of the FSB archives in Moscow, exactly 297,280 Polish citizens were deported in 1940.

The total number of deportees from Western Ukraine was 198,536 people – it should be treated as the minimum of documented casualties:

- February 1940 – 89,062 people (approximately 84.8% Poles, 13.8% Ukrainians, 1.4% Jews and others) deported to the north-east of European Russia, Siberia, and Kazakhstan;
- April 1940 – 31,332 people (approximately 70.6% Poles, 25.0% Ukrainians, 3.0% Jews, 1.4% Russians, Germans, others) deported to Kazakhstan;
- June–July 1940 – 67,049 people (approximately 84.6% Jews, 11.0% Poles, 3.3% Ukrainians, 0.4% Germans, 0.7% others) deported to Siberia and the north-east of European Russia;
- May/June 1941 – 11,093 people (mostly Ukrainians, also Poles and others) deported to Siberia and Kazakhstan.

After June 22, 1941, the period of Sovietisation came to an end when Germany took East Galicia during Operation Barbarossa. This was a period of massacres. Evacuating Soviets decided to summarily kill the mass of people waiting in the prisons for deportation to the Gulag even if their fault was petty crimes or no fault at all. When Wehrmacht forces arrived in the area, they discovered evidence of the mass murders committed by the NKVD and NKGB, including mass killing of Poles and Ukrainians.

After the outbreak of the German-Soviet war, in June 1941, thousands of prisoners have been murdered in mass executions in prisons (among others in Lviv) and during the evacuation (so-called death marches).

On June 30, 1941, Yaroslav Stetsko declared the "Act of Proclamation of Ukrainian Statehood" in Lviv, and became the Prime Minister in the Ukrainian government. The act was accepted by Andrey Sheptytsky, the Metropolitan Archbishop of the Ukrainian Greek Catholic Church, on July 1, 1941. This was done without approval of the Germans, so they arrested many OUN-B activists, between 6 and 11 July 1941. Finally, Stepan Bandera, Yaroslav Stetsko, Roman Ilnytsky and Volodymyr Stakhiv were sent to the Sachsenhausen concentration camp, and Galicia was subsequently incorporated into the General Government as Distrikt Galizien.

As Germany viewed Galicia as already partially aryanized and civilized, more non-Jewish Galicians escaped the full extent of German intentions than many other Ukrainians who lived more eastward. Despite the more lenient extent of German control for some of the Galician population, many Galicians, especially Jewish Galicians, were deported to concentration camps, much like elsewhere in Ukraine.

Most of the 500 000 Jews (around 12% of the population) were shot on the edge of common graves or killed in Belzec. The Lwów Ghetto was established after the |Lviv pogroms, holding around 120,000 Jews.

Conflicts in Galicia and Volhynia between Poles and Ukrainians also intensified during this time, with skirmishes between the Polish Home Army (AK), Ukrainian Insurgent Army (UPA), German Wehrmacht, and Soviet partisans. These conflicts included the massacres of Poles in Volhynia, and within Galicia, revenge attacks on Ukrainians and Operation Vistula. Despite these warring factions, and despite Ukrainian Galicians joining the UPA and supporting its anti-Soviet, anti-Polish, and anti-German policies, some also joined Germany in its fight against the USSR, forming the 14th Waffen Grenadier Division of the SS Galizien (1st Ukrainian). The Division SS "Galizien" was commanded by German and Austrian officers (Walter Schimana, Fritz Freitag) who were delegated to the division.

=== Post WWII ===
In August 1945, Poland and the USSR signed a border treaty formally recognizing the new frontier between them. According to this treaty, much of prewar Eastern Galicia was incorporated into the Ukrainian Soviet Socialist Republic, while Poland was compensated with lands in the west. This border largely followed the Curzon Line, which had already been agreed upon in principle during wartime conferences. These territorial changes were confirmed by the major Allied powers, who had recognized the realignment at Yalta.

Many ethnic Poles who had lived in what became Soviet territory (particularly from the cities of Lviv, Tarnopol, Stanisławów, and Drohobych) were resettled in postwar Poland. According to historical estimates, as many as 810,000 Poles left former Eastern Galicia and Volhynia, registering for resettlement in Poland. This movement was only partially voluntary: while some Poles opted to leave, others were pressured or compelled to do so, and the Home Army even tried local resistance, though it remained limited.

At the same time, a large number of Ukrainians who had remained on the Polish side of the new border were uprooted. Between October 1944 and September 1946, almost 500,000 Ukrainians registered for resettlement, moving primarily into Soviet Ukraine. In 1947, the Polish communist regime launched Operation Vistula, a large-scale forced resettlement designed to break up and dilute the Ukrainian minority in southeastern Poland. The forced depopulation of Ukrainians in the borderlands was intended to undermine the social base of the Ukrainian Insurgent Army, which continued guerilla activity in the Carpathians well into the 1950s.
