= Yuri of Galicia =

Yuri of Galicia may refer to:

- King Yuri I of Galicia (1252–1308)
- Boleslaw-Yuri II of Galicia and Masovia (1308–1340)
