= Yuri II =

Yuri II may refer to:

- Yuri II of Vladimir (died 1238), grand prince
- Yuri II Boleslav (died 1340), prince of Ruthenia

== See also ==
- Yuri I
