= Galicia–Volhynia Wars =

Collection of Wars between Ruthenia and Poland-Lithuania

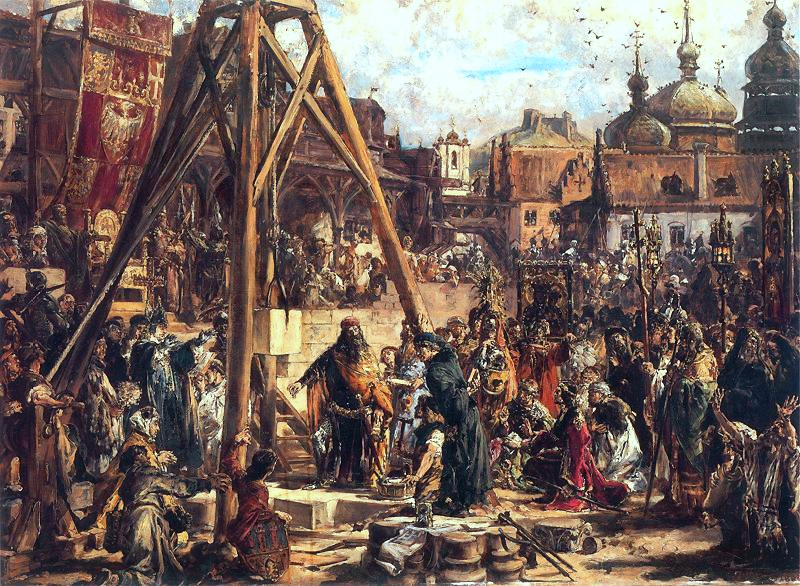
- Casimir III visiting Lwów after the city's reoccupation by Poland in 1366, as depicted by 19th-century painter Jan Matejko
Date	1340–1392
Location	Ruthenia (present-day West Ukraine)
Result	Fall of the Kingdom of Galicia–Volhynia; Ruthenia divided between Poland and Lithuania

Belligerents
Kingdom of Poland; Kingdom of Hungary; Duchy of Masovia; Local Ruthenian factions	Grand Duchy of Lithuania; Golden Horde; Local Ruthenian factions

Commanders and leaders
Casimir III of Poland; Louis I of Hungary; Jogaila	Liubartas; Dmytro Dedko; Vytautas; Tokhtamysh; Danylo Ostrozky

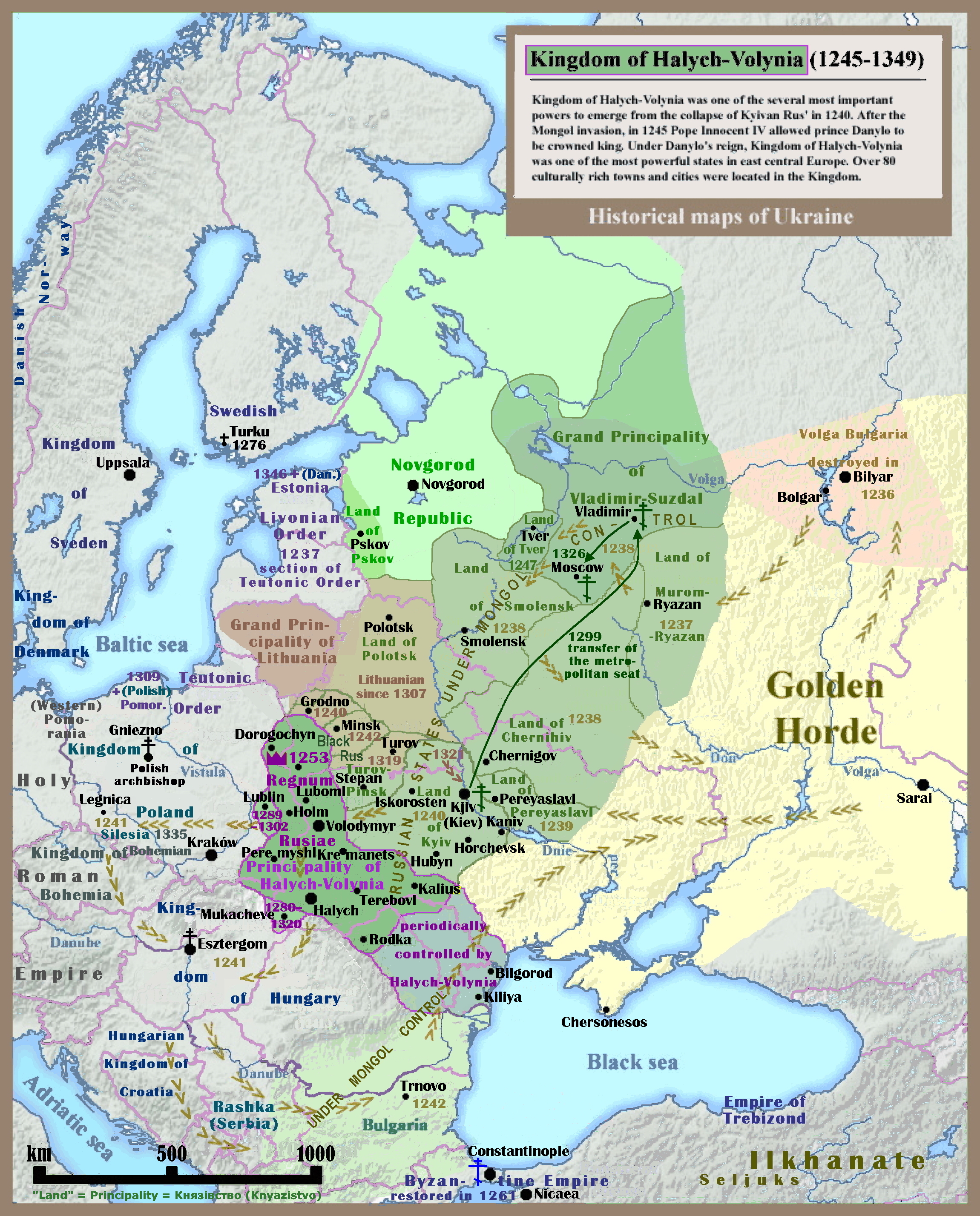
The Kingdom of Galicia–Volhynia (1245–1349)

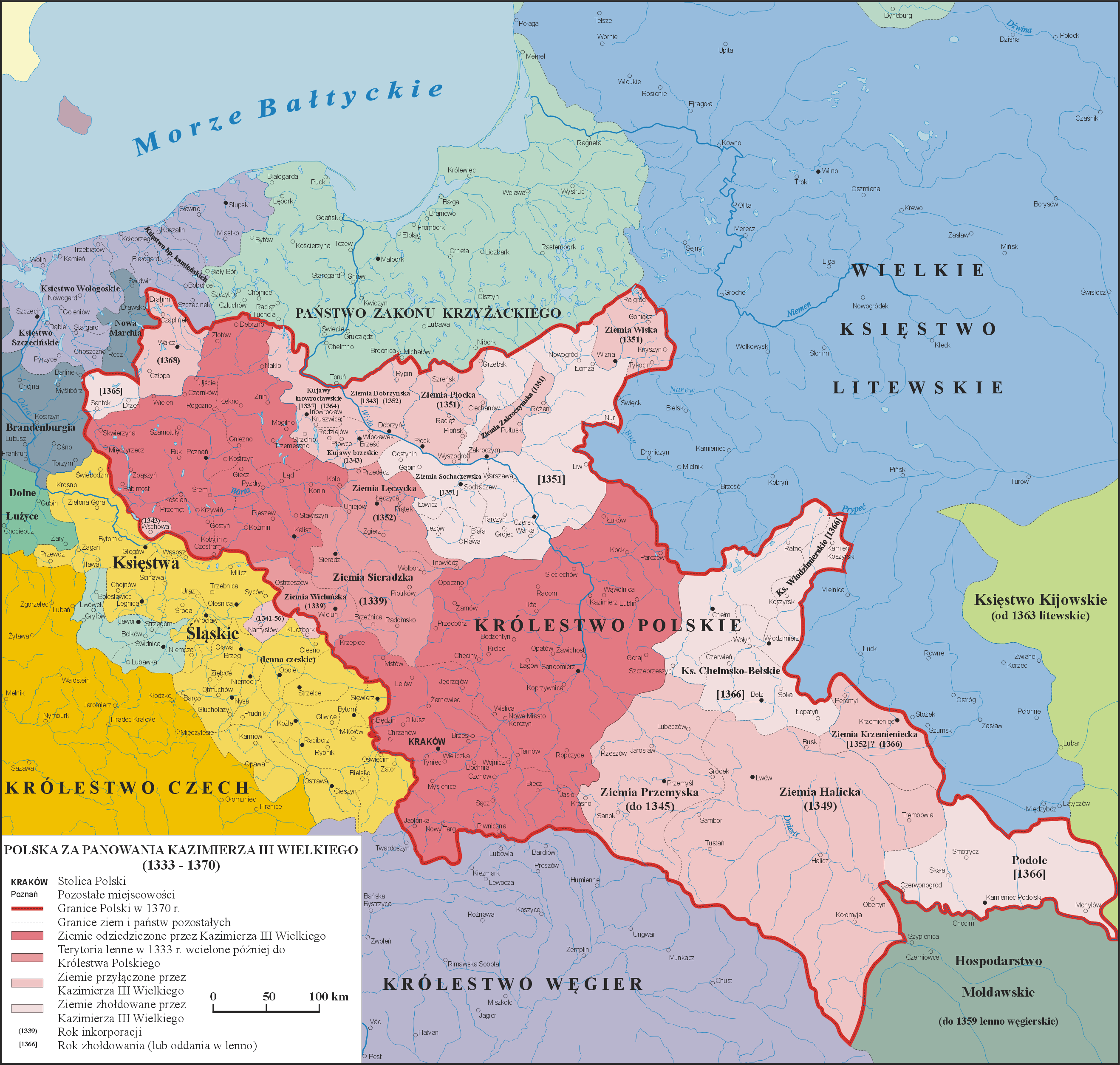
Map of Kingdom of Poland (1333–70). Note territorial expansion into southeast (light pink).

The Galicia–Volhynia Wars were several wars fought in the years 1340–1392 over the succession in the Kingdom of Galicia–Volhynia, also known as Ruthenia. After Yuri II Boleslav was poisoned by local Ruthenian nobles in 1340, both the Grand Duchy of Lithuania and the Kingdom of Poland advanced claims over the kingdom. After a prolonged conflict, Galicia–Volhynia was partitioned between Poland (Galicia) and Lithuania (Volhynia) and Ruthenia ceased to exist as an independent state. Poland acquired a territory of approximately 52,000 square kilometres (20,000 sq mi) with 200,000 inhabitants.

== Background ==
Brothers Andrew and Leo II died c. 1322, leaving no male successor in Galicia–Volhynia. Instead of promoting his son Liubartas (who was married to Andrew's daughter) and causing a war with Poland, Gediminas of Lithuania compromised with Władysław I of Poland. Both parties agreed to install fourteen-year-old Yuri II Boleslav, a Masovian prince and nephew of Leo and Andrew. Yuri Boleslav was the son of Trojden I of Masovia from the Polish Piast dynasty, a cousin of Władysław I and nephew of Gediminas' son-in-law Wenceslaus of Płock. To strengthen the compromise, Yuri Boleslav was betrothed to Eufemija, daughter of Gediminas. He was poisoned in April 1340 by local nobles who resented growing Polish and Bohemian influence in the court. Yuri Boleslav did not have an heir and his death upset the region's fragile power balance.

== Conflicts ==
=== First stage ===
Within days of Yuri Boleslav's murder, Casimir III of Poland invaded the kingdom to save Polish merchants and Catholic residents from attacks in Lviv. In June 1340, Casimir returned with a larger army, conquered Lviv and burned down the Lviv High Castle. After four weeks he reached an agreement with local nobles and their leader Dmytro Dedko: in return for their services, local nobles would enjoy protection from the Polish king. However, the agreement was short-lived. The data is sparse, but it seems that Galicia–Volhynia was divided between the Lithuanians (Liubartas ruled in Volhynia and its chief city Volodymyr) and local nobles (Detko ruled Galicia).

During the winter of 1340–1341, the Golden Horde (probably with Lithuanian help) attacked Poland and reached Lublin as a result of diminished tribute from the principality of Galicia to the Mongol khan. The raid weakened Polish influence in the principality of Galicia. In order to assist Casimir, a Hungarian contingent commanded by William Drugeth entered the Ruthenian border and fought against the Mongols. Eufemija, Yuri Boleslav's widow, was drowned in the Vistula in winter 1342 to keep her out of the succession disputes. Detko, who managed to play Poles, Lithuanians, and Mongols against each other, disappeared from written sources in 1344. The same year direct conflict between Poland and Lithuania renewed, but soon a peace treaty was signed: Volhynia was assigned to Liubartas and Galicia to Casimir.

=== Second stage ===
After the Lithuanians were defeated in the Battle of Strėva by the Teutonic Knights in 1348, Liubartas lost all territories except for eastern Volhynia with Lutsk to Casimir and his ally Louis I of Hungary (Louis was promised the territories if Casimir died without an heir). Liubartas' brothers Algirdas and Kęstutis organized several expeditions to Poland and Red Ruthenia. Lithuanians allied themselves with Muscovy: Liubartas married an unnamed daughter of Konstantin of Rostov, a relative of Simeon of Moscow, and Algirdas married Uliana of Tver, sister-in-law of Simeon.

In spring 1351, Lubartas was taken prisoner by Louis, but was released in summer after a truce was agreed upon with Kęstutis. The deal fell through and more military attacks followed in 1352. Another truce, rather favourable to the Lithuanians, was signed in fall 1352: Lubartas received not only Volhynia and Podolia, but also Belz and Chełm (Kholm). However, already in 1353, Liubartas attacked again. Casimir responded by organizing a large campaign against the pagan Lithuanians with a special permission from Pope Innocent VI. After the campaign did not achieve the desired results, Casimir contemplated an alliance with the Lithuanians.

In 1366, Casimir, allied with Siemowit III of Masovia and nephews of Liubartas, resumed the war. As Algirdas was involved in conflicts in the east and Kęstutis fought with the Teutonic Knights, Liubartas had to defend alone and was defeated. In fall 1366, a treaty was signed: Liubartas retained only eastern Volhynia with Lutsk and became somewhat dependent on Poland (he had to retain neutrality in case Poland attacked Lithuania). Casimir rewarded his allies: Yuri, son of Karijotas, received Chełm, his brother Aleksander received Volodymyr, and Yuri, son of Narimantas, continued to rule Belz.

=== Third stage ===
In 1370, Liubartas took advantage of Casimir's death and captured all of Volhynia, including Volodymyr. Between 1370 and 1387, Galicia was ruled by the Hungarian crown. Louis of Hungary appointed Vladislaus II of Opole as his regent in the region. In 1376, the war resumed: Liubartas, Kęstutis, and Yuri of Belz attacked Sandomierz and Tarnów, reaching as far as Kraków and taking many prisoners. After retaliation by Louis, Liubartas had to swear loyalty to Hungary as his sons were taken hostage. Liubartas could expect little help from Lithuania as his brother Algirdas died in 1377. In 1378, Louis attached Galicia directly to the Kingdom of Hungary. After Louis death in 1382, Liubartas captured castles ruled by Hungarians (including Kremenets and Przemyśl), but did not renew a full-scale war. At the time Lithuania, Poland, and Hungary – all three main contenders for the former Galicia–Volhynia – were engulfed in dynastic succession disputes. Polish nobles crowned Hungarian Jadwiga of Poland as their king and invited Lithuanian Jogaila to become her husband. Jadwiga and Jogaila signed the Union of Krewo in 1385, creating a personal union between Poland and Lithuania. In 1387, Jadwiga attached Galicia to Poland for good.

Liubartas died c. 1384 and his throne was inherited by his son Theodor (Fedir). Jogaila started limiting Theodor's sovereignty in Volhynia. Jogaila, hoping to reconcile with his cousin Vytautas after the Lithuanian Civil War (1381–1384), even promised Lutsk and Volodymyr to Vytautas. However, that did not appease Vytautas, who sought to regain his patrimony in Trakai and gain power in the Grand Duchy of Lithuania, and he started the Lithuanian Civil War (1389–1392). The civil war ended with the Ostrów Agreement of 1392, which settled Galician–Volhynian issue for good: Poland took Galicia adopting title Dei gratia rex Polonie et Russie, nec non Cracovie, Sandomirie, Siradie, Lancicie, Cuiavie, et Pomeranieque Terrarum et Ducatuum Dominus et Heres, while Lithuania controlled Volhynia.
