= Leo of Galicia =

Leo of Galicia may refer to:

- Leo I of Galicia, king of Galicia–Volhynia (1269–1301), also known as Lev Danylovich
- Leo II of Galicia, the last Ruthenian king of Galicia–Volhynia (1308–1323), also known as Lev Yuriyovych
