= Euphemia of Kuyavia =

Euphemia of Kuyavia (c. 1265 – 18 March 1308) was a Kuyavian princess and Queen consort of Galicia-Volhynia.

She was the daughter of Casimir I of Kuyavia by his third wife Euphrosyne, daughter of Casimir I of Opole. Euphemia was sister of Władysław I the Elbow-high, the wife of Yuri I of Galicia, and the mother of Andrew of Galicia and Lev II of Galicia.

The only preserved evidence of Euphemia's existence is from Jan Długosz's Yearbooks, which reported that Euphemia died on 18 March 1308. She was the daughter of Prince Casimir and the wife of Yuri I, who died in the same year on 21 April, which was also his birthday.

== Biography ==
=== Birth ===
Her parents' marriage was concluded in mid 1257, and her father died on 14 December 1267. Thus, Euphemia soon after the wedding. Literature puts her birth at around 1265. In the absence of sources of an accurate date of birth, it is not possible to determine when Euphemia was born.

It is most likely that Euphemia was named after her aunt, Euphemia of Greater Poland. There is also a possibility, though less likely, that she received her name from a daughter of Swantopolk II, Duke of Pomerania because her father tried to make peace with him.

=== Marriage ===
As reported by Jan Długosz, Euphemia was married to Yuri I of Galicia. The date of the wedding is however unknown. Certainly, the marriage took place before the second half 1290, the year in which Euphemia's niece, Fenenna of Kuyavia married Andrew III of Hungary. There are however some predictions of when the marriage took place.

One of these declares that the marriage took place in the summer of 1289. When Yuri was in competition for the throne of Cracow between Euphemia's cousin, Bolesław II of Masovia and Henry IV Probus Euphemia's brother helped Yuri. According to this hypothesis in the summer of 1289 the situation changed when Conrad II of Masovia's brother the Prince of Płock brother decided to separate Sandomierz from his brother. Lesser knights opposing the plan began to promote the plans of Euphemia's half-brother, Ziemomysł of Kuyavia. This strengthened Lev I of Galicia's claim over the other candidates for the throne of Kraków. In return for the military aid against the Duke of Mazovia, Lev I received Lublin. An alliance with Euphemia's brother meant Euphemia could marry his son, Yuri.

== Children ==
Euphemia and Yuri I were parents to four children:

1. Andrew of Galicia (d. 1323), King of Galicia-Volhynia
2. Lev II of Galicia (d. 1323), King of Galicia-Volhynia
3. Maria (d. 11 January 1341), married Trojden I of Masovia
4. Anastasia (d. 1364-65), married Aleksandr Mikhailovich of Tver, they were parents of Uliana of Tver, who was the mother of Jogaila
