= Liubartas =

Lithuanian prince (died c. 1383)

Liubartas Demetrius of Liubar
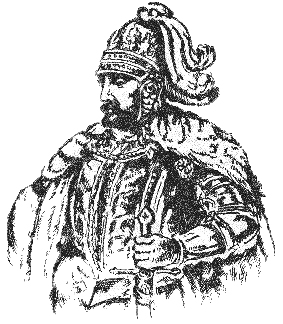
- Modern illustration

Prince of Volhynia
- Reign: 1340–1383
- Predecessor: George II Boleslav
- Successor: Theodore of Volhynia

Prince of Galicia
- Reign: 1340-1349 (represented by Dmytro Dedko)
- Predecessor: George II Boleslav
- Successor: Casimir the Great
- Died: c. 1383
- Spouse: 1. Euphemia of Volhynia; 2. Daughter of Konstantin of Rostov
- House: Gediminids
- Father: Gediminas

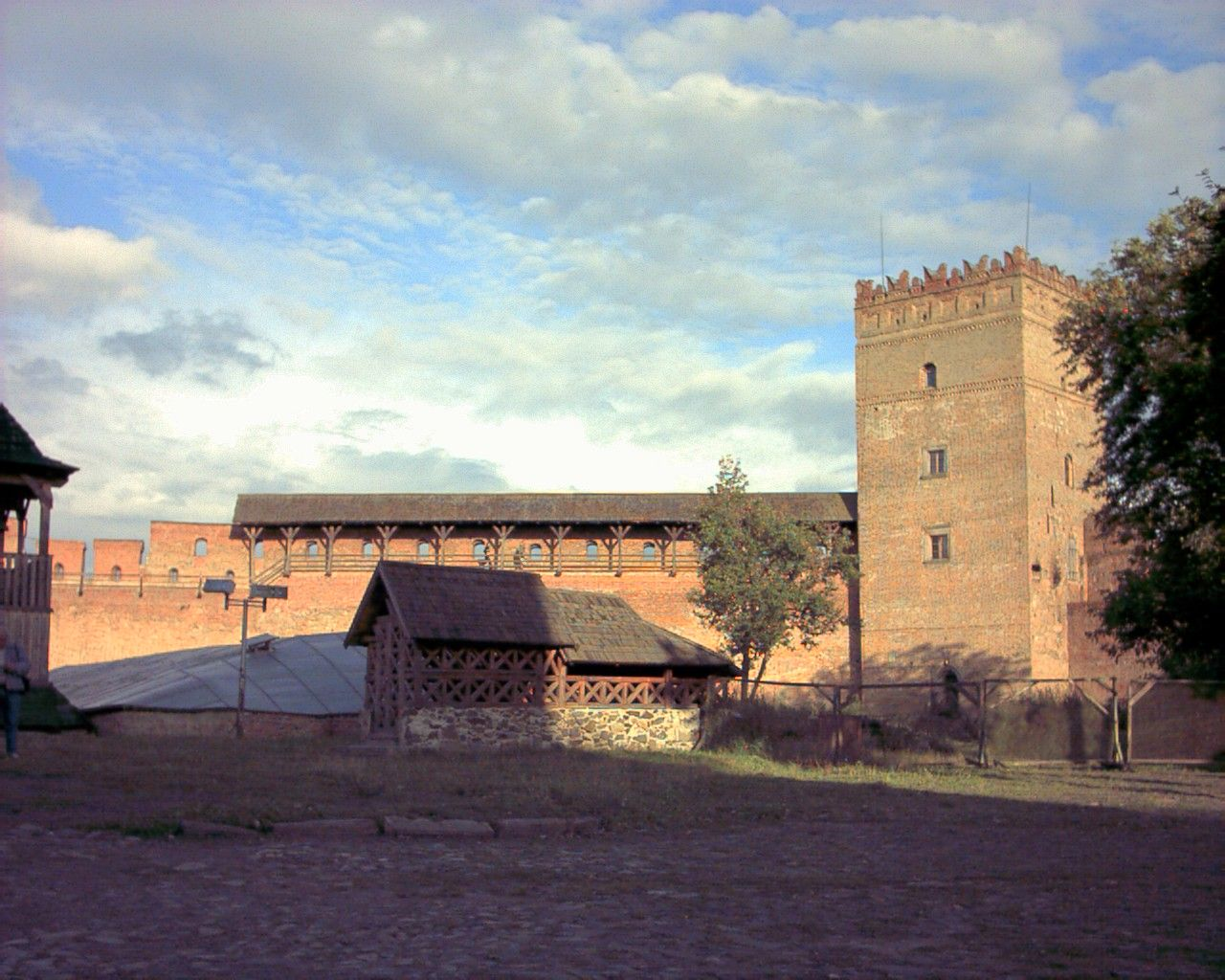
Lutsk Castle, Ukraine, built by Liubartas and improved by Vytautas the Great. During Lithuanian rule the city started to prosper

Liubartas or Demetrius of Liubar (Note: also known as Lubart, Lubko, Lubardus, baptized Dmitry) (died c. 1383) was a Lithuanian prince from the Gediminid dynasty. He was the prince of Volhynia, and from 1320, he ruled over Lutsk, Liubar and Zhytomyr. Liubartas was also the last ruler of the Kingdom of Galicia–Volhynia.

== Biography ==
Liubartas was the youngest son of Gediminas, Grand Duke of Lithuania. In the early 1320s he married a daughter of Andrew of Galicia and ruled Lutsk with Liubar (today town in Zhytomyr Oblast) in eastern Volhynia. After Andrew and his brother Leo II died around 1322, Galicia–Volhynia did not have a male successor. Instead of promoting Liubartas and causing a war with Poland, Gediminas compromised with Ladislaus the Short. Both parties agreed to install Yuri II Boleslav, nephew of Leo and Andrew.

Boleslaw-Yuri was a son of Trojden I, Duke of Masovia from the Piast dynasty, a grandson of Traidenis, a cousin of Władysław I, and nephew of Gediminas' son-in-law Wenceslaus of Płock. At the time Boleslaw was fourteen years old and was betrothed to Eufemija, daughter of Gediminas. Liubartas continued to rule Lutsk and Volodymyr. That way the Galicia–Volhynia Wars were postponed until after Boleslaw's poisoning in 1340. He was poisoned by rebellious nobles, who invited Liubartas to become the ruler for both Galicia and Volhynia. Sources are too scarce to fully reconstruct events between 1341–1349.

Despite the support from his brothers Algirdas and Kęstutis, Liubartas lost all territories except for eastern Volhynia with Lutsk to Casimir III of Poland in 1349. In 1351 he was even taken prisoner during a battle, and Kęstutis had to rescue him. In 1366 a treaty was signed: Liubartas retained eastern Volhynia with Lutsk, while Poland got western Volhynia and Galicia. However the matter was settled only in 1370: Liubartas took advantage of Casimir's death and captured all of Volhynia. The territories changed again only in 1569, when Volhynia, including Lutsk, was transferred to Poland by the Union of Lublin.

In 1382, after death of Louis I of Hungary, Liubartas captured Kremenets, Przemyśl, and other cities from Hungary. He supported his brother Kęstutis against nephew Jogaila during the succession fights. He built a castle in Lutsk, known as the Lubart's Castle, that survives to this day. Liubartas died c. 1385, having ruled Volhynia for roughly sixty years. He married for the second time c. 1350 to an unnamed daughter of Konstantin of Rostov, a relative of Simeon of Moscow.

== Family ==
- 1321/23 married Hanna-Buch (Euphemia), princess of Volhynia, daughter of Andrew of Galicia
- 1350 married daughter of Konstantin of Rostov II
  - Fedor/Theodore of Volhynia (~1351–1431)
  - Lazar (died after 1386)
  - Semen (died after 1386)
  - Demetrius, presumably ancestor of the Sanguszko

== See also ==
- Family of Gediminas – family tree of Liubartas
- List of princes of Galicia and Volhynia

== Notes ==
Liubartas Gediminids Born: c.1300 Died: December c.1383
Regnal titles
Preceded by Leo II of Galicia (as King of Rus)	Prince of Liubar; 1323–1340	Succeeded by Grand Prince of Rus
Preceded by Leo II of Galicia (as King of Rus)	Prince of Lutsk; 1323–1324	Succeeded by George II Boleslav (as King of Rus)
Preceded by George II Boleslav (as King of Rus)	Grand Prince of Volhynia; 1340–1383	Succeeded by Alexander of Podilia (as Prince of Volodymyr)
Preceded by Alexander of Podilia (as Prince of Volodymyr)	Grand Prince of Volhynia; 1340–1383	Succeeded by Theodore of Volhynia
