= Maria of Galicia =

Galicia-Volhynia princess

Maria of Galicia (also Mary; before 1293 – 11 January 1341) was a princess of Galicia-Volhynia and a member of the Rurik Dynasty. She was sister to Leo II of Galicia and Andrew of Halych, daughter of Yuri I of Galicia and his second wife, Euphemia of Kuyavia (d. 1308). She assisted her son king Boleslaus George II of Halych in ruling Galicia.

In 1323, her brothers Andrew of Galicia and Volynia and Leo II of Galicia were killed, and she and her niece, Eufemia, Heiress of Volynia-Lutsk, inherited the lands. Her grandfather, Leo I of Galicia, had been king of Galicia 1269-1301 and he moved his capital from Galich (Halicz) to the newly founded city of Lviv (Lwow, Lemberg).

Her mother, Euphemia of Kuyavia, was the daughter of Casimir I of Kuyavia. Before 1310, she married Duke Trojden I of Masovia, with whom she is traditionally said to have had four children:

1. Yuri II Boleslav (1310 – 21 March 1340), became King of Ruthenia;
2. Euphemia (1312 – c. 11 January 1374), married Casimir I, Duke of Cieszyn;
3. Siemowit III, Duke of Masovia (1316/1325 – 16 June 1381), Duke of Masovia;
4. Casimir I of Warsaw (1329/1331 – 26 November/5 December 1355), traditionally listed as her son by Trojden I; according to a 2026 archaeogenetic study, however, he was not the biological son of Trojden I.
