= Yuri II Boleslav =

5th King of Ruthenia

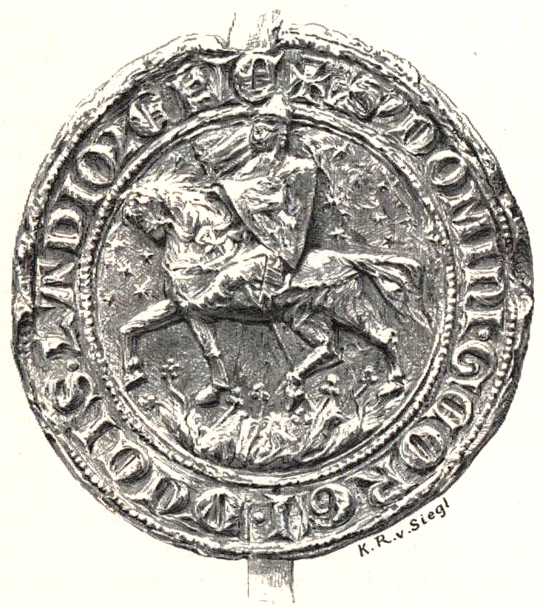
- King's seal of Yuri II of Boleslav

King of Ruthenia
- Reign: 1323–1340
- Predecessor: Andrew and Leo II of Galicia
- Successor: Liubartas
- Born: c. 1305-10
- Died: c. 1340 (aged c. 30)
- Spouse: Eufemia (daughter of Gediminas)
- House: Piast
- Father: Trojden I of Masovia
- Mother: Maria of Galicia

Yuri II Boleslav (Ukrainian: Юрій-Болеслав Тройденович, romanized: Yurii-Boleslav Troidenovych; Polish: Bolesław Jerzy II; Latin: Georgius; c. 1305/1310 – April 7, 1340), was a prince and Dominus of Ruthenia (Latin: natus dux et dominus Russiae) in 1325–1340. He was the son of Trojden I, Duke of Masovia, a member of the Piast dynasty and the grandson of Yuri I of Galicia. His murder prompted a war of succession, known as the Galicia–Volhynia Wars.

== Biography ==
Bolesław was born between 1305 and 1310 to Trojden I of Masovia and Maria, daughter of Yuri I of Galicia. Since his father was still a ruler of the family's Masovian lands, in 1323/1325 Bolesław succeeded Leo II of Galicia and became the ruler over Ruthenia (Galicia and Volynia) as Yuri II. He also received the Duchy of Belz after the childless death of Andrew of Galicia. He used the titles of "Georgius Dei gratia Rex Russiae", "Georgius Dei gratia Dux Russiae", "Georgius Dei gratia Dux terrae Russiae, Galiciae et Ladimeriae".

His candidacy (from a family of minor Masovian princes) pleased neighboring rulers (primarily the Tatar Khan), who did not see him as a competitor. Yuri II was a Catholic by birth, but later converted to Orthodoxy to avoid confrontation with the local aristocracy of Galicia and Volynia during his reign (the boyars resisted his rule). In 1324, Yuri granted city rights to Volodymyr, where he established his court, and in 1339 granted Magdeburg Law to Sanok.

The foreign policy of Yuri II was characterized by a balance in relations with the Kingdom of Poland, the Grand Duchy of Lithuania, Rome and the Tatars. However, Yuri II paid the greatest attention to relations with the Teutonic Order. In a 1325 charter, Yuri II promises the Grand Master of the Teutonic Order Werner von Orseln to observe peace and friendship, "as our ancestors did: King Danylo, great-grandfather Lev, and dearest grandfather Yuri." In 1327, Yuri II concluded an alliance with the Teutonic Order and also granted permission to trade to Toruń merchants. Correspondence between Yuri II and Pope John XXII has also been preserved — the duke of Ruthenia pursued an active policy with Rome. In 1331, Yuri II achieved the restoration of the Metropolis of Halych (which Moscovian prince Ivan Kalita and Metropolitan Theognostus tried to conquer) by the Patriarch of Constantinople Isaias.

In 1331, he married the daughter of Grand Duke of Lithuania Gediminas and sister of Aldona of Lithuania, wife of Casimir III of Poland. The name of Bolesław's wife is disputed; Teodor Narbutt claimed her pagan name was Eufemia and her Christian name was Maria. In opposition, Oswald Balzer claimed that Eufemia was a Christian name. It is widely believed that Narbutt's account was a fabrication.

Yuri II was poisoned in 1340 by Orthodox Ruthenian boyars and died without an heir. Leontiy Voytovych believes that the motives for poisoning Yuri II were not a religious issue, but a diplomatic game of the local boyars with Poland and Hungary, who agreed on their own candidate in 1338 at the Vyshgorod Congress.

Yuri's murder sparked the Galicia–Volhynia Wars fought in the years 1340–1392 over succession in the Kingdom of Ruthenia, which ultimately resulted in the kingdom ceasing to be an independent state, but instead being split between Poland (Galicia) and Lithuania (Volhynia).

== Ancestry ==
Ancestors of Yuri II Boleslav

16. Konrad I of Masovia (=28)
8. Siemowit I of Masovia
17. Agafia of Rus (=29)
4. Bolesław II of Masovia
18. Daniel of Galicia (=24)
9. Pereyaslava of Halych
19. Anna of Toropets (=25)
2. Trojden I, Duke of Masovia
10. Traidenis
5. Gaudemunda of Lithuania
1. Yuri II Boleslav of Galicia
24. Daniel of Galicia (=18)
12. Lev I of Galicia
25. Anna of Toropets (=19)
6. Yuri I of Galicia
26. Béla IV of Hungary
13. Constance of Hungary
27. Maria Laskarina
3. Maria of Galicia
28. Konrad I of Masovia (=16)
14. Casimir I of Kuyavia
29. Agafia of Rus (=17)
7. Euphemia of Kuyavia
30. Casimir I of Opole
15. Euphrosyne of Opole
31. Viola, Duchess of Opole

== Notes ==
Yuri II Boleslav Piast dynasty Born: 1308 Died: 1340
Regnal titles
Preceded by Andrew and Leo II	King of Ruthenia; 1323–1340	Succeeded by Casimir
