= List of princes of Galicia and Volhynia =

This is a list of princes of Galicia (Halych or Halychyna) and its sister principality Volhynia (Volyn' or Volodymyr; Latin: Lodomeria). They were basically separate principalities (rulers being closely related), until Roman Mstislavich "the Great" united Halych and Volhynia in 1199. He was a prince (knyaz) of Volhynia who conquered also Halych, but immediately gave it to his son.

They continued usually as separate states, but within the same dynasty and under vassalage to the knyaz of Halych until Lev, who annexed Volhynia to the principality. The royal crown lapsed and rulers were known as princes and/or dukes after the death of Andriy Yuriyovych (1323).

== Volhynia ==
=== Princes of independent Volhynia ===
- Boris Vladimirovich
- Vsevolod I 987–? - brother of Boris
- Sviatoslav I 1036–1054 - also ruler of Kievan Rus'
- Igor Yaroslavich, 1054–1056
- Rostislav I 1056–1064 - also ruler of Tmutarakan.
- Oleg I 1075–1076 - also ruler of Chernigov.
- Yaropolk I Iziaslavich 1078–1087
- David Igorevich 1087–1099
- Mstislav I Sviatopolkovich 1099
- Yaroslav 1100–1118 - brother of Mstislav I.
- Roman I Vladimirovich 1118–1119
- Andrew I 1119–1135 - brother of Roman I.
- Iziaslav I Mstislavich 1135–1141
- Sviatoslav II 1141–1146 - also ruler of Kiev.
- Vladimir I Andriyovich 1146–1149
- Sviatopolk Mstislavich 1149
- Iziaslav II 1149–1151 - brother of Sviatopolk.
- Sviatopolk Mstislavich (again) 1151–1154
- Vladimir II Mstislavich 1154–1157
- Mstislav II 1157–1170 - also ruler of Kiev.
- Sviatoslav III Mstislavich 1170–1173
- Roman II the Great 1173–1188
- Vsevolod II Mstislavich 1188
- Roman II the Great (again) 1188–1199 - also ruler of Kiev

=== Volhynia in the Kingdom of Halych-Volhynia ===
- Between 1199 and 1205: annexed by the Kingdom of Halych–Volhynia
- Sviatoslav IV Igorevych 1206–1207
- Alexander Vsevolodovich 1208, 1209–1215
- Between 1215 and 1238: annexed by the Kingdom of Galicia-Volhynia
- Vasylko Romanovych 1238–1269
- Volodymyr Vasylkovych 1269–1288
- Mstyslav Danylovych 1288–1292
- In 1293, Lev I centered all the power of the kingdom in his own hands, and the principality ceased to exist.

== Halych ==
=== Princes of independent Halych ===
- Volodar Rostyslavych of Tmutarakan ?–1084
- Vasilko Romanovich 1084–?
- Yuriy Vasilkovich ?
- Igor- Ivan Rostyslavych Berladnik ?–1141
- Volodymyrko Volodarovych or Vladimir I Volodarovich 1141–1153
- Yaroslav Osmomysl 1153–1187
- Oleg Yaroslavich 1187
- Vladimir II Yaroslavych 1187–1189
- Oleg Yaroslavich (restored) 1188
- Roman the Great 1188
- Andrew I 1188–1190
- Vladimir II Yaroslavych (restored) 1190–1199

=== Halych in the Kingdom of Halych–Volhynia ===
Between 1199 and 1206: annexed by the Kingdom of Halych–Volhynia

- Vladimir III Igorevich 1206–1208
- Roman II Igorevich 1208–1210
- Vladimir III Igorevich (again) 1211

Between 1211 and 1213: annexed by the Kingdom of Halych–Volhynia

- Vladislav 1213
- Coloman of Halych–Volhynia and Salomea of Poland 1213-1219
- Andrew II 1220–1221
- Mstislav the Bold 1219–1228

Between 1228 and 1264: annexed by the Kingdom of Halych–Volhynia

- Svarn 1264–1269
- In 1293, Lev I centered all the power of the kingdom in his own hands, and the principality ceased to exist.

== Halychyna and Volynia (Halych–Volhynia) ==
=== Romanovichi ===
Portrait	Name	Born-Died	Ruled From	Ruled Until
	Roman the Great, son of Mstislav II of Kiev. Roman united Halych and Volhynia in 1199.	1160–1205	1199	1205
	Daniel, under regency during his minority. Batu Khan confirmed Daniil as prince of Halych and Volynia in 1245. Crowned in 1253.	1201–1264	1205 (disputed); 1245 (confirmed)	1264
	Leo I	1228–1301	1264	1301
	Yuri I	1252–1308	1301	1308
	Andrew, brother of Lev II, ruled jointly with him.	?-1323	1308	1323
	Leo II, brother of Andrew, ruled jointly with him.	?-1323	1308	1323

=== Piast Dynasty ===
Portrait	Name	Born-Died	Ruled From	Ruled Until
	Boleslaw-Yuri II, grandson of Yuri I by his mother Maria.	1298/1308–1340	1325	1340
	Casimir, brother-in-law of Boleslaw-Yuri II. Also king of Poland 1333–1370. Died without male heirs and all his possessions passed to Louis of Anjou, his nephew.	1310–1370	1340	1370

=== House of Anjou ===
Portrait	Name	Born-Died	Ruled From	Ruled Until
	Louis I the Great, nephew of Casimir. As King of Hungary, received all possessions of his uncle, becoming also King of Poland.	1326-1382	1370	1382
	Maria, eldest daughter of Louis I. Also Queen of Hungary.	1371-1395	1382	1387
	Hedwig, sister of Maria. Also Queen of Poland.	1373-1399	1387	1399

In 1399, Galicia-Volhynia merged in the Kingdom of Poland.

== See also ==
- List of wars and battles involving Galicia–Volhynia
