= Andrew of Galicia =

King of Ruthenia

Andrew
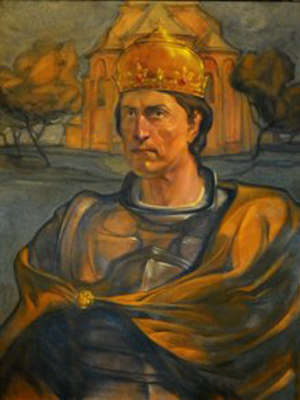

Duke of Lodomeria
- Reign: 1308–1323
- Predecessor: Yuri I
- Successor: Yuri II
- Co-monarch: Leo II
- Died: c. 1323; Berestia
- Issue: Euphemia of Volhynia
- House: Romanovichi
- Father: Yuri I of Galicia
- Mother: Euphemia of Kuyavia

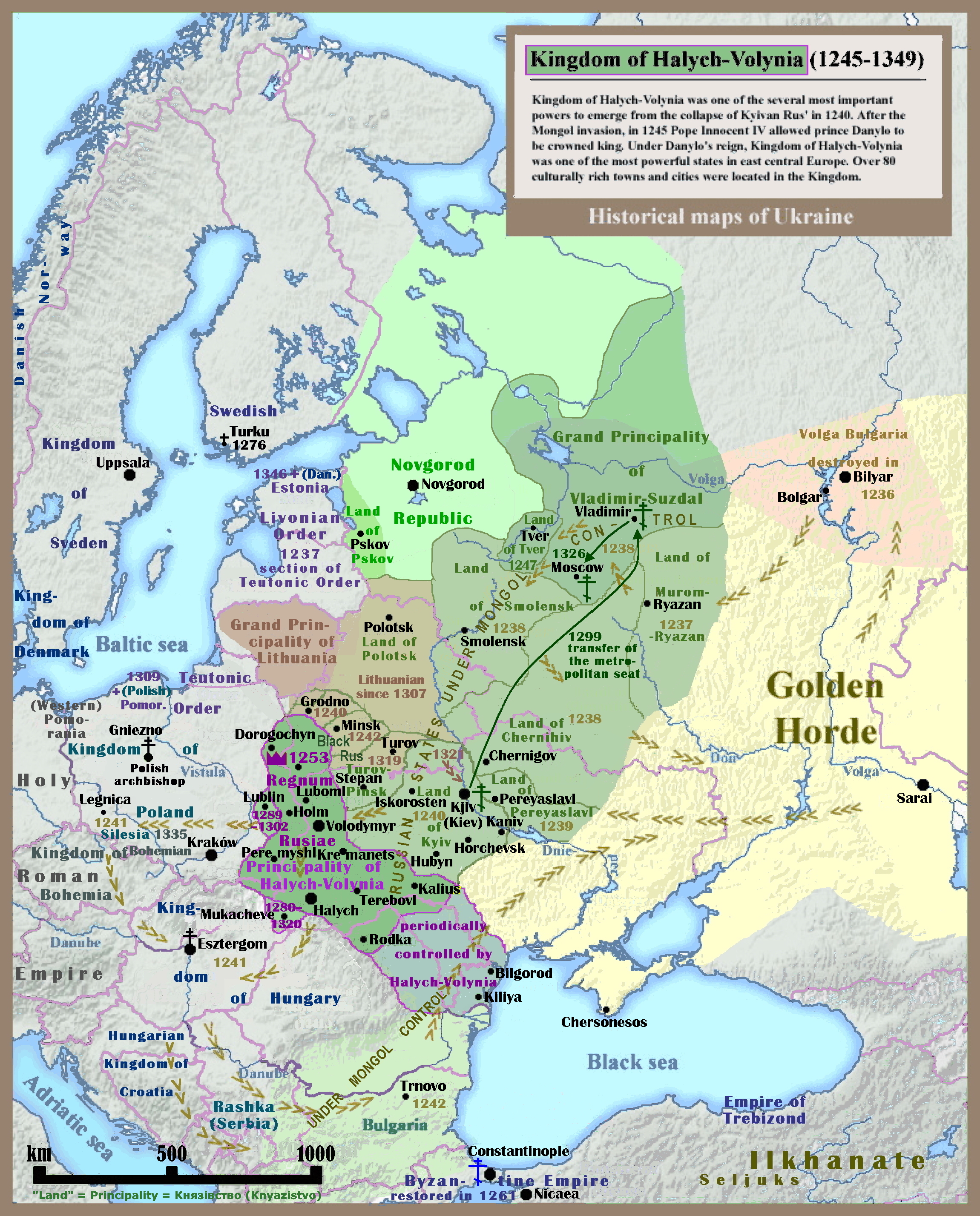
The Kingdom of Galicia–Volhynia (1245–1349).

Andrew (Ukrainian: Андрій Юрійович, romanized: Andrii Yuriiovych, Latin: Andreas) (unknown – 1323) was a ruler of Galicia-Volhynia in 1308–1323 (according to other sources since 1315) under the title "Duke of Lodomeria and Lord of Ruthenian Land" (Latin: dux Ladimirae et dominus terrae Russiae).

He was the son of Ruthenian king Yuri I (1252–1308) whom he succeeded on the throne of Galicia. His mother was Euphemia of Kuyavia. After the death of his father, he ruled the kingdom together with his brother Lev II, with both being colectively titled "Princes of All Lands of Ruthenia, Galicia and Lodomeria" (Latin: duces totius terrae Russiae, Galiciae et Ladimirae). Though their state state managed together, there are sources informing that Andrew was seated in Volodymyr and Lev II in Galicia.

== Reign ==
It is known that in the second decade of 14th century, the Lithuanians strengthened their pressure upon Galicia-Volhynia attempting to take the lands of Dorohychyn and Berestia away. During these years of rule Andrew and his brother were in a constant fight with Gediminas of Lithuania. He had established firm relations with Polish king Władysław I the Elbow-high and Teutonic order and attempted to weaken dependence from the Golden Horde. They were also in union with the allies of Władysław I the Elbow-high - Scandinavian and Pomeranian rulers against the margraves of Brandenburg (1315).

As a ruler of Volodymyr in Volhynia, Andrew promoted the trade of his realm with the Baltic region and Poland. In 1320 he issued a charter allowing merchants from Toruń and Kraków to freely enter Ruthenian lands with their goods without paying any tolls and with equal rights to the local population, and guaranteed them compensation in case of violations. This policy continued the course of his father Yuri Lvovych.

== Death ==
According to some historians he died together with his brother Lev II battling the Mongol-Tatars or Lithuanians while defending Berestia.

Both king Andrew and his brother Lev II were much respected in the west. In May 1323, the Polish king Władysław I the Elbow-high in his letter to the Pope wrote with regret: "The two last Ruthenian kings, that had been firm shields for Poland from the Tatars, left this world and after their death Poland is directly under Tatar threat."

After their death the line of direct descendants of Roman Mstyslavych broke and the Galician state remained without a dynasty. Galician boyars (nobility) attempted to rule the state themselves. That perhaps was the reason that they sought the protection of the Tatars, which Władysław I the Elbow-high became afraid of. But soon more conservative elements took hold among the boyars and the Galician throne was given to the Mazovian duke Boleslaw Trojdenowicz (related to the deceased royal brothers through marriage to their sister Maria), who took the name Yuriy II and who ruled Galicia from 1323 until 1338. Boleslaw Treojdenowicz was married to Andrew's sister Maria who ruled along with the husband. Her niece, Eufemia, heiress of Volhynia ruled in Lutsk.

== Family ==
Daughter

- Euphemia of Volhynia. Married Liubartas, youngest son of Gediminas the Grand Duke of Lithuania

== See also ==
- List of princes of Galicia and Volhynia

Andrew of Galicia Romanovichi Born: ? Died: 1323
Regnal titles
Preceded by Yuri I	King of Galicia-Volhynia; 1308–1323 with Lev II (1308–1323)	Succeeded by Boleslaw-Yuri II
