= Yuri I of Galicia =

King of Ruthenia (1301–1308)

- King of Ruthenia
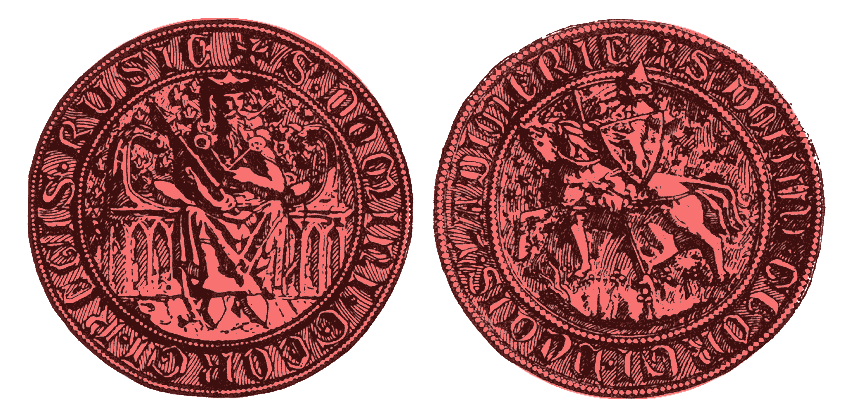
- King's seal of Yuri I of Halych, "Domini Georgi Regis Rusie", "Domini Georgi Ducis Ladimerie"

King of Ruthenia
- Reign: 1301–1308
- Predecessor: Leo I of Galicia
- Successor: Andrew and Leo II of Galicia
- Born: c. 1252/1257 or 1262
- Died: 23 April 1308 or 1315
- Spouse: 1st. Yaroslavna of Tver (died ca. 1286); 2nd. Euphemia of Kuyavia (daughter of Casimir I of Kuyavia); 3rd. Unknown
- Issue: Mykhailo Yurylovich; Maria, Duchess of Masovia; Andrew, King of Galicia; Leo II, King of Galicia; Anastasia, Grand Princess of Vladimir and Tver; Dmytro Dedko (disputed)
- House: Romanovichi
- Father: Leo I of Galicia
- Mother: Constance of Hungary

Yuri I of Galicia (Old Ruthenian: Юрьи Лвовичь; Ukrainian: Ю́рій Льво́вич, romanized: Yurii Lvovych, 24 April 1252 (1257/1262) – 18 March 1308/1315) was King of Ruthenia and Prince of Volhynia.

== Reign ==
In 1264–1301, Yuri ruled as Prince of Belz. Initially a ruler of Kholm and Podlachia, after his father's death he united all lands of Galicia-Volhynia into one principality with its capital in Volodymyr. During his tenure Poland regained the Lublin region and Hungary seized a part of Transcarpathia. However, in general Yuri's reign was largely peaceful and his realm flourished economically. He maintained especially close relations with the princes of Kuyavia in Poland, marrying Euphemia, the sister of Władysław Łokietek. After the Metropolitan of Kyiv had moved his seat to Vladimir in the north, Yuri succeeded in securing the establishment of the Metropolis of Halych by Patriarch Athanasius I of Constantinople in 1303, which included the eparchies of Halych, Volodymyr, Peremyshl, Lutsk, Kholm and Turov. In 1308, Yuri promoted the nomination of Peter of Rata as Metropolitan of Kiev. He was succeeded by his two sons.

== Family ==
Ancestry

Yuri was a son of Leo I of Galicia and Constance of Hungary, a daughter of King Béla IV of Hungary.

Marriages

He married three times. His first wife was Yaroslavna of Tver (died c. 1286). His second wife was Euphemia of Kuyavia (died 18 March 1308), daughter of Casimir I of Kuyavia. His third wife is unknown.

Sons

- Mykhailo (1283–1286) (first marriage)
- Andrew of Galicia, Prince of Ruthenia (1308–1323)
- Leo II, Prince of Ruthenia (1308–1323)
- Dmytro, Lord of Ruthenia (1340–1349)

Daughters

- Maria, Princess of Ruthenia, (died 11 January 1341). Married Trojden I of Masovia
- Anastasia (parentage uncertain; died 1364–1365). Married Alexander I of Tver (died 1339)

== Ancestry ==
Ancestors of Yuri I of Galicia

8. Roman the Great
4. Daniel of Galicia
9. Euphrosene Angelina
2. Leo I of Galicia
10. Mstislav Mstislavich
5. Anna of Toropets
11. Maria of Cuman
1. Yuri I of Galicia
12. Andrew II of Hungary
6. Béla IV of Hungary
13. Gertrude of Merania
3. Constance of Hungary
14. Theodore I Laskaris
7. Maria Laskarina
15. Anna Komnene Angelina

== See also ==
- List of princes of Galicia and Volhynia

Yuri I of Galicia Romanovichi Born: c. 1252 Died: 18 March 1308
Regnal titles
Preceded by Lev I	King of Galicia-Volhynia; 1301–1308	Succeeded by Andrew; Leo II
