= Leo II of Galicia =

King of Ruthenia (1308–1323)

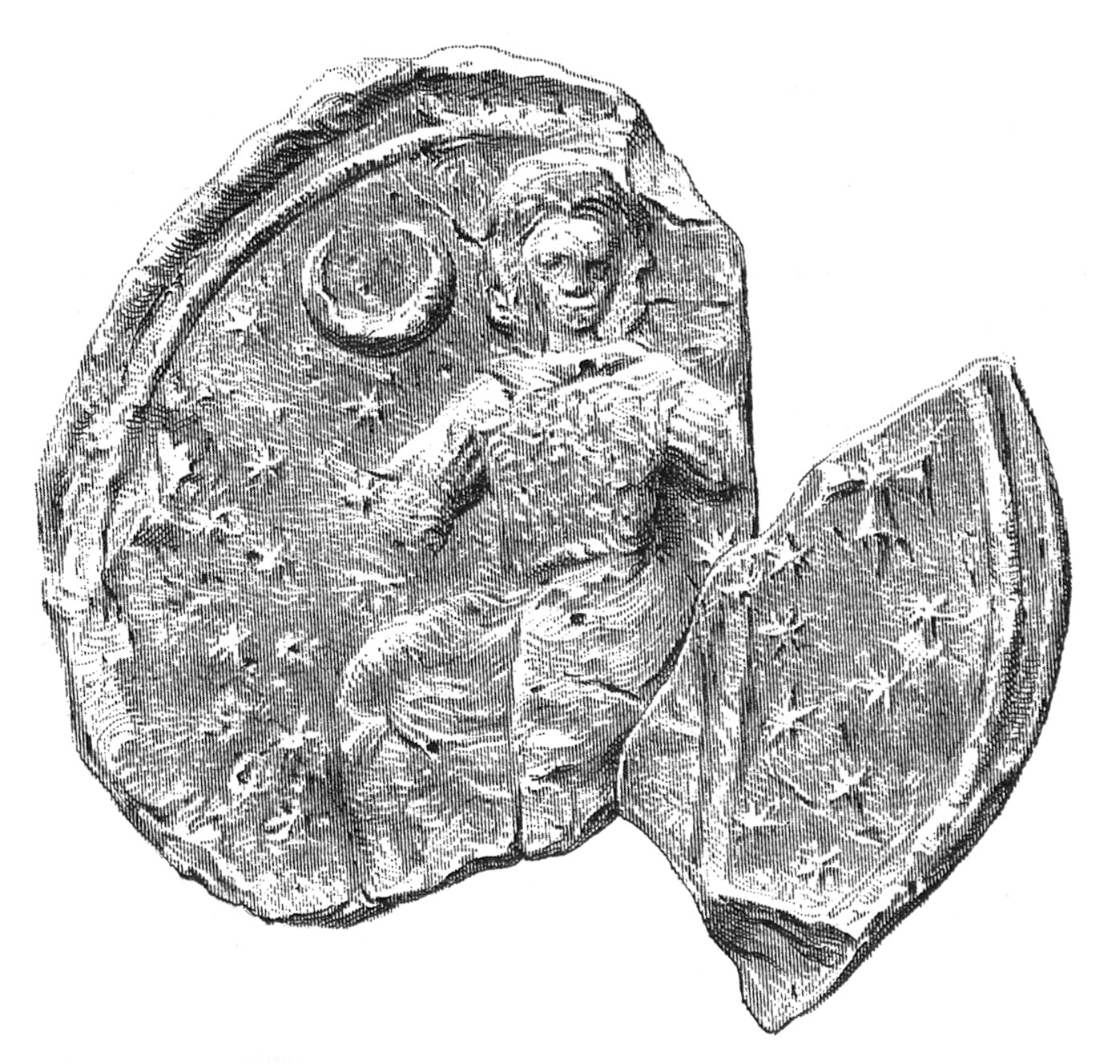
- King's seal of Leo II of Galicia

Prince of Galicia
- Reign: 1308–1323
- Predecessor: Yuri I of Galicia
- Successor: Yuri II Boleslav
- Co-monarch: Andrew of Galicia
- Born: Unknown
- Died: c. 1323; Berestia
- House: Romanovichi
- Father: Yuri I of Galicia
- Mother: Euphemia of Kuyavia

Leo II of Galicia, also known as Lev Yuriiovych (Ukrainian: Лев Юрійович, died in 1323) was Prince of Lutsk and Galicia (Latin: dux Galiciae), one of the last two Romanovichi rulers of Rus' (r. 1308–1323; according to some sources, 1315–23). He was a member of the senior branch of Monomakhovichi.

Leo was the son of King Yuri I (1252–1308), whom he succeeded on the royal throne of Galicia-Volhynia. His mother was Euphemia of Kuyavia. After the death of his father, he ruled the kingdom together with his brother Andrew. According to most sources, the brothers were co-kings, managing the kingdom together, but there are sources indicating that Lev II was seated in Halych and Andrew in Volodymyr, which would seem to imply split jurisdiction. The brothers' policy was aimed at weakening their principality's dependence on the Golden Horde by allying themselves with the Teutonic Knights and Poland.

== Reign ==
The first common letter of Lev II and Andrew dates to August 9, 1316. In it they renewed the union with the Prussian Crusaders (the Teutonic Order, also known as Teutonic Knights), whom they promised to defend from the Tatars and "any hostile invader"; the latter mention apparently referred to the Grand Duchy of Lithuania, as that state at the time threatened not only the unity but also the very existence of both the Knights and the Galician state. In the second decade of 13th century, the Lithuanians increased their pressure upon Galicia-Volhynia, eventually wresting away control of Dorohychyn and Berestia. The years of the brothers' "joint" reign were in spent in more-or-less constant conflict with both the Gediminids of Lithuania and with their own nominal overlords, the Mongol-Tatars of the Golden Horde.

Lev II and Andrew established firm relations with the Polish High Duke (King) Władysław I and, as already pointed out above, with the crusading knights of the Teutonic Order, and worked to lessen the degree of their kingdom's subservience to the Golden Horde. They were also in union with the allies of King Władysław I – the Scandinavian Kings and the Pomorian Dukes – against the Margraves of Brandenburg (1315).

== Death ==
Sources differ on the circumstances of his death; most historians agree he died, together with his brother Andrew, in 1323, but there is disagreement over whether they were battling the Mongol-Tatars or the Lithuanians, and over whether the deaths occurred while defending Pidliashia or Berestia. According to the Encyclopedia of Ukraine, the brothers died in a fight against Tatars.

Both King Lev and his brother King Andrew were apparently much respected in the west. In May 1323, Polish King Władysław I, in a letter to the Pope, wrote with obvious regret: "Two last Ruthenian (Ukrainian) kings, that had been firm shields for Poland from Tatars, left this world and after their death Poland is directly under Tatar threat.

In 1321, Lev's son, Prince George of Lutsk, the last of the line, had died in a battle with the forces of Grand Duke Gediminas of Lithuania while defending the castle in Lutsk. After the deaths of Lev II and his brother two years later, the line of the direct descendants of Roman Mstislavich ended, and the Galician state was left without a ruling dynasty. The Galician boyars (nobility) subsequently attempted to rule the state themselves. Fearing subjugation by Władysław I, they apparently sought the protection of the Tatars. But soon more conservative elements amongst the boyars gained the upper hand, and the Galician throne was given to the Mazovian Duke Boleslaw Trojdenowicz (who was related to the deceased royal brothers through the marriage of his father Trojden I of Masovia to their sister Maria).

== Ancestry ==
Ancestors of Leo II of Galicia

8. Daniel of Galicia
4. Leo I of Galicia
9. Anna of Toropets
2. Yuri I of Galicia
10. Béla IV of Hungary
5. Constance of Hungary
11. Maria Laskarina
1. Leo II of Galicia
12. Conrad I of Mazovia
6. Casimir I of Kuyavia
13. Agafia of Rus
3. Euphemia of Kuyavia
14. Casimir I of Opole
7. Euphrosyne of Opole
15. Viola, Duchess of Opole

== See also ==
- List of princes of Galicia and Volhynia

Leo II of Galicia Romanovichi Born: ? Died: 1323
Regnal titles
Preceded by Yuri I	King of Galicia-Volhynia; 1308–1323 with Andrew (1308–1323)	Succeeded by Boleslaw-Yuri II
