= List of wars and battles involving Galicia–Volhynia =

This is a list of wars and battles involving the Principality, from 1253 Kingdom of Galicia–Volhynia (Halych–Volyn), also known as Ruthenia.

Victory of Galicia–Volhynia (and allies)
Defeat of Galicia–Volhynia (and allies)
Another result*

*e.g. result unknown or indecisive/inconclusive, result of internal conflict inside Galicia–Volhynia, status quo ante bellum, or a treaty or peace without a clear result.

Date	Conflict	Combatant 1	Combatant 2	Result
1199	Leszek the White's expedition to Halicz	Principality of Galicia–Volhynia	Leszek the White	Polish victory
1200–1204	Kievan succession crisis	Roman the Great	Rurik Rostislavich	Inconclusive
1202–1204	Roman's campaigns against the Cumans (1202-1204)	Principality of Galicia–Volhynia	Cumans	Ruthenian victory
1205	Battle of Zawichost	Principality of Galicia–Volhynia	Leszek the White	Polish victory: Death of Roman the Great; Start of War of the Galician Succession (1205–1245)
1207	The expedition of Leszek the White to Ruthenia	Principality of Galicia–Volhynia	Leszek the White	Polish victory
1206–1210	Internecine war in Rus' 1206–1210	Principality of Chernigov; Principality of Turov; Cumans; Principality of Ryazan (until 1207); Principality of Galicia-Volhynia (since 1206); Principality of Pereyaslavl (since 1206); Vladimir-Suzdal (since 1209)	Principality of Smolensk; Novgorod Republic; Kingdom of Hungary; Vladimir-Suzdal (until 1209); Principality of Ryazan (from 1207); Kingdom of Poland (from 1208); Principality of Volhynia (from 1208)	Mixed results: Olgovichi of Chernigov captured Kiev and Galicia; Yurievichi of Suzdalia captured Ryazan; Rostislavichi of Smolensk captured Novgorod
1213	Galician campaign (1213—1214)	Principality of Galicia–Volhynia	Leszek the White Kingdom of Hungary	Leszek's military victory: Lezsek failed to take Halych, but destroyed several towns
1213–1214	Andrew II's campaign against Halych	Principality of Galicia–Volhynia	Kingdom of Hungary	Hungarian victory: Coloman becomes Prince of Galicia
1214	The expedition of Leszek the White to Vladimir Volynsky	Principality of Galicia–Volhynia	Leszek the White	Polish victory
1219–1221	Galician Uprising (1219–1221): Siege of Halych (1221)	Principality of Galicia–Volhynia: Galician rebels; Mstislav Mstislavich of Novgorod; Danylo Romanovych of Volhynia	Leszek the White; Kingdom of Hungary: Andrew II of Hungary; Coloman of Galicia	Ruthenian victory
1223	Battle of the Kalka River (first Mongol invasion of Kievan Rus')	Principality of Kiev; Principality of Galicia–Volhynia; Principality of Chernigov; Principality of Smolensk; Cuman–Kipchak Confederation	Mongol Empire; Brodnici	Crushing Kievan Rus' defeat: Armies of the Rus' principalities and Cumans mostly destroyed; Mongols plundered some towns and retreated east towards Volga Bulgaria, where they were defeated in the Battle of Samara Bend
1227–1238	Hungarian–Romanovych war in Halych: Battle of Zvenyhorod (1227); Siege of Halych (1229); Siege of Halych (1230); Hungarians recaptured Halych (c. 1231); Siege of Volodymyr-Volynskyi (1232); Battle of Shumsk (1233); Siege of Halych (1233); Siege of Halych (1237); Danylo conquered Halych (late 1238, or early 1239)	Danylo Romanovych: Principality of Volhynia; Pro-Danylo Halych	Kingdom of Hungary: Pro-Hungary Halych	Danylo victory
1228–1236/40	Internecine war in Rus' 1228–1240: Casus belli: death of Mstyslav Mstyslavych Udatnyi (1228); Siege of Kamianets (1228); Siege of Chernigov (1235); Battle of Torchesk (1235); Siege of Kamianets (1236); Kiev campaign of Yaroslav Vsevolodovich (1236); late 1238 (or early 1239): Danylo conquered Halych; winter (?) 1239–40: Danylo conquered Kiev	Principality of Volhynia; Principality of Kiev; Principality of Smolensk	Principality of Novgorod-Seversk; Cumania	Danylo victory
1236–1237: 1236	Wars between Konrad I of Masovia and Galicia–Volhynia: Battle of Czerwień	Principality of Galicia–Volhynia	Konrad I of Masovia	Ruthenian victory
March 1238	Battle of Drohiczyn (1238)	Principality of Galicia–Volhynia	Order of Dobrzyń	Ruthenian victory
1237–1241	Mongol invasion of Kievan Rus' (second) (see also List of battles of the Mongol invasion of Kievan Rus'): spring 1239 – autumn 1240: Batu's raid of 1240 in Ruthenia; 6 December 1240: Batu Khan's Siege of Kiev (1240)	Kievan Rus': Kiev; Galicia–Volhynia; Vladimir-Suzdal; Novgorod Republic; Smolensk; Turov and Pinsk; Chernigov; Ryazan; Pereyaslavl	Mongol Empire; Brodnici	Decisive Kievan Rus' defeat (Note: After the Mongol invasion of Kievan Rus' of 1237–1241 (including the 1240 sack of Kiev which ended Kievan Rus'), most of the surviving Rus' principalities (exceptions included the Novgorod Republic) were forced to pay tribute and homage to Batu Khan (residing in Sarai on the Volga) of the newly-established Mongol-Tatar Golden Horde.): Kievan Rus' destroyed; Most surviving Rus' principalities became vassals of the Mongol Golden Horde.; In December 1245–January 1246, Danylo of Halych submitted to Batu Khan in Sarai (sub anno 1250 Galician–Volhynian Chronicle)
winter–spring 1242	Invasion of Galicia by Rostislav Mikhailovich	Principality of Galicia–Volhynia	Principality of Chernigov	Ruthenian victory
17 August 1245	Battle of Jarosław (1245)	Principality of Galicia–Volhynia	Galician opposition Kingdom of Hungary; Duchy of Kraków	Ruthenian victory
10th–13th century	Rus'–Yotvingian Wars: 1248 Romanovych campaign against the Yotvingians	Rus' principalities, primarily: Principality of Kiev; Principality of Volhynia	Yotvingians	Mixed results
c. 1249–1250	Romanovych campaign against Lithuanians in Novgorodok (GVC sub anno 1254)	Principality of Galicia–Volhynia (Grand Duchy of Lithuania) Lithuanians of Tautvilas & Gedvydas	(Grand Duchy of Lithuania) Lithuanians of Mindaugas	Ruthenian-allied victory
1250s	War between Galicia–Volhynia and the Golden Horde: Casus belli: For refusing to renew their jarligs upon the 1251 accession of Möngke Khan, Batu Khan sent punitive expeditions against Andrey II of Vladimir and Danylo of Halych; Nevryuy's campaign against Andrey (1252); Kuremsa's campaign against Danylo (c. 1252–1258); Boroldai/Burandai compelled Danylo to send his brother Vasylko on a campaign against Lithuania (1258); Golden Horde invasion / ultimatum by Boroldai/Burandai (Nov 1259)	Principality of Galicia–Volhynia (until 1253); Kingdom of Galicia–Volhynia (from 1253): Danylo of Halych; Vasylko Romanovych; Vladimir-Suzdal (1252): Andrey II of Vladimir	Golden Horde: Batu Khan; Sartaq Khan; Kuremsa; Boroldai/Burandai	Golden Horde victory: Andrey was defeated and fled (1252); Danylo crowned King of Ruthenia with Pope's support (1253), but planned crusade did not materialise; Danylo won against Kuremsa (1252–1258); Danylo fled to Poland and Hungary (1259); Vasylko Romanovych dismantled anti-Horde fortifications in Halych (1259); Danylo renewed his submission to Golden Horde
1256	Battle of Lutsk (1256)	Kingdom of Galicia–Volhynia	Grand Duchy of Lithuania	Ruthenian victory
1280	Kraków campaign of Leo I of Galicia	Kingdom of Galicia–Volhynia; Golden Horde	Kingdom of Poland: Duchy of Sandomierz; Duchy of Sieradz	Polish victory
1320s	Battle on the Irpin River	Principality of Kiev: Stanislav of Kiev; Oleg of Pereyaslavl †; Roman of Bryansk; Leo II of Galicia †	Grand Duchy of Lithuania: Gediminas	Lithuanian victory. The historicity of this battle is questioned.
1340–1392	Galicia–Volhynia Wars: Casus belli: Assassination of Yuri II Boleslav	Kingdom of Poland; Ruthenian nobles	Grand Duchy of Lithuania; Ruthenian nobles	Compromise: Volhynia incorporated into Lithuania; Galicia part of the Crown of the Kingdom of Poland, from 1434 as Ruthenian Voivodeship; Kingdom of Galicia–Volhynia ceased to exist; Ruthenian nobility continued to develop, and Kievan Rus' law had great influence on Statutes of Lithuania

== See also ==
- Armies of the Rus' principalities
- List of wars and battles involving the Golden Horde
- List of wars involving Kievan Rus'
- List of wars involving the Novgorod Republic
- List of wars involving the Principality of Moscow
- List of wars involving the Principality of Tver
- List of wars and battles involving the Principality of Smolensk
- List of wars involving Lithuania
- List of wars involving Poland
- List of wars involving the Polish–Lithuanian Commonwealth
- List of wars involving Belarus
- List of wars involving Russia
- List of wars involving Ukraine

== Bibliography ==
=== Primary sources ===
- Galician–Volhynian Chronicle (c. 1292)
  - Perfecky, George A. (1973). The Hypatian Codex Part Two: The Galician–Volynian Chronicle. An annotated translation by George A. Perfecky. Munich: Wilhelm Fink Verlag. OCLC 902306.

=== Literature ===
- Halperin, Charles J. (1987). Russia and the Golden Horde: The Mongol Impact on Medieval Russian History. Indiana University. p. 222. ISBN 9781850430575. (e-book).
- Hrushevsky, Mykhailo (1901). Хронологія Подій Галицько-волинського Літопису [Chronology of the Events of the Halych–Volyn Chronicle] (in Ukrainian). Lviv: Records of the Shevchenko Scientific Society.
- Katchanovski, Ivan; Kohut, Zenon E.; Nesebio, Bohdan Y.; Yurkevich, Myroslav (2013). Historical Dictionary of Ukraine. Lanham, Maryland; Toronto; Plymouth: Scarecrow Press. p. 992. ISBN 9780810878471. Archived from the original on 23 April 2023.
- Martin, Janet (2007). Medieval Russia: 980–1584. Second Edition. E-book. Cambridge: Cambridge University Press. ISBN 978-0-511-36800-4.
