= List of armed conflicts between Poland and Ukraine =

The list of armed conflicts between Poland and Ukraine summarizes armed conflicts between Poland and Ukraine, including their antecedent states such as the Polish–Lithuanian Commonwealth and Kingdom of Galicia–Volhynia, respectively.

Polish victory

Ukrainian victory

Inconclusive/Victory for either Pro or Anti-Ukrainian forces

== Piast Poland versus Kievan Rus' ==
This is a list of wars between Piast Poland and Kievan Rus', from the 10th to the 13th century.

Polish victory
Kievan Rus' victory
Another result*

*e.g. result unknown or indecisive/inconclusive, result of internal conflict inside Piast Poland or Kievan Rus' in which the other intervened, status quo ante bellum, or a treaty or peace without a clear result.

Date	Conflict	Piast Poland and allies	Kievan Rus' and allies	Result
981	Vladimir the Great's Polish Campaign	Civitas Schinesghe	Kievan Rus'	Kievan Rus' victory
1013	Bolesław the Brave's expedition to Kievan Rus	Civitas Schinesghe	Kievan Rus'	Polish victory
1017	Yaroslav the Wise's raid of gord	Civitas Schinesghe	Kievan Rus'	Polish victory
1018	Bolesław I's intervention in the Kievan succession crisis	Civitas Schinesghe; Pro-Sviatopolk Kievan Rus'	Pro-Yaroslav Kievan Rus'	Temporary joint victory for Poland and Sviatopolk: Poles left Kiev; acquired Cherven Cities; Yaroslav ousted Sviatopolk from Kiev
1022	Yaroslav the Wise's attack on Brest	Civitas Schinesghe	Kievan Rus'	Polish victory
1030–1031	Yaroslav the Wise invasion in Poland(German-Polish War)	Kingdom of Poland	Kievan Rus'	Kievan Rus' victory: Kievan Rus' recovered the Cherven Cities
1065–1069	Rebellion of Vseslav of Polotsk: Sieges of Pskov and Novgorod (1065–1067); Battle on the Nemiga River (1067); Kiev uprising of 1068; Intervention by Bolesław II the Bold (1069)	Principality of Kiev; Principality of Chernigov; Principality of Pereyaslavl; Kingdom of Poland (1069)	Principality of Polotsk	Allied victory: Principality of Polotsk defeated (1067); Brief Vseslav reign in Kiev (1068–May 1069); Polish intervention (May 1069); Restoration of Iziaslav I of Kiev (May 1069)
1076–1077	Kievan succession crisis: Casus belli: death of Sviatoslav Yaroslavich (26 December 1076); Vsevolod besieged Iziaslav in Volyn (1077); Boris Sviatoslavich captured Chernigov, but Vsevolod ousted him (May 1077); Iziaslav recovered Kiev with Polish support (July 1077)	Iziaslav Yaroslavich; Bolesław II of Poland Boris Sviatoslavich	Vsevolod Yaroslavich	Compromise: Iziaslav and Vsevolod concluded peace; Iziaslav recovered Kiev with Polish help (July 1077); Vsevolod retained Chernigov; Sons of Sviatoslav exiled to Tmutorakan
1092	Vasilko Rostislavich's raid on Poland	Kingdom of Poland	Kievan Rus'	Kievan Rus' victory
1120—1125	Polish-Ruthenian war (1120—1125): Kievan-Cuman raid on Poland (1120); Battle of Wysokie (1122); Siege of Volodymyr (1123); Battle of Wilichów (1124)	Kingdom of Poland	Kievan Rus'	Polish victory (Note: In the end, after the Battle of Wilichów, Bolesław III Wrymouth defeated Vladimirko Volodarovich)
1142-1143	Vsevolod's raid on Poland	Kingdom of Poland	Kievan Rus'	Kievan Rus' victory
1163	Polish raid on Rus'	Kingdom of Poland	Kievan Rus'	Polish victory
1182–1183	War for Brest	Kingdom of Poland	Kievan Rus'	Polish victory
1192	Battle of Drohiczyn	Kingdom of Poland	Kievan Rus'	Polish victory

== Kingdom of Poland versus Galicia–Volhynia (Ruthenia) ==
Date	Conflict	Poland and allies	Ruthenia and allies	Result
1199	Leszek the White's expedition to Halych	Duchy of Sandomierz; Duchy of Kraków	Principality of Galicia–Volhynia	Sandomierz victory
1205	Battle of Zawichost	Duchy of Sandomierz; Duchy of Kraków; Duchy of Masovia	Principality of Galicia–Volhynia	Sandomierz–Masovian victory
1206	Leszek the White's expedition to Volodymyr	Duchy of Sandomierz; Duchy of Kraków	Principality of Galicia–Volhynia	Sandomierz victory
1207	Leszek the White's expedition to Volodymyr	Duchy of Sandomierz; Duchy of Kraków	Principality of Galicia–Volhynia	Sandomierz victory
1211	Polish–Hungarian Expedition to Halych (1211): Siege of Przemyśl (1211); Siege of Zvenigorod (1211); Battle of Zvenigorod (1211)	Kingdom of Hungary; Kingdom of Poland	Principality of Galicia–Volhynia	Polish victory
1213—1214	Galician campaign (1213–1214): Battle of Bóbrka (1214)	Duchy of Kraków; Duchy of Sandomierz	Principality of Galicia–Volhynia; Kingdom of Hungary	Sandomierz military victory (Note: Although Leszek did not get Halych, he fulfilled his aim of introducing his influence and achieved a military victory, but not a political one.)
1218	Leszek the White's expedition to Ruthenia	Duchy of Sandomierz; Duchy of Kraków	Principality of Galicia–Volhynia	Ruthenian victory
1219—1221	Polish–Hungarian–Ruthenian War: Battle of Halych (1219); Battle of Halych (1220); Battle of Halych (1221)	Kingdom of Hungary; Kingdom of Poland	Principality of Galicia–Volhynia	Ruthenian victory
1224—1225	Polish–Ruthenian War (alias war between Leszek the White and Mstislav Mstislavich): Battle of Łysa Góra (1224); Mstislav's expedition to Poland (1225)	Duchy of Sandomierz; Duchy of Kraków	Principality of Galicia–Volhynia	Sandomierz victory
1227	Battle of Zvenigorod	Kingdom of Hungary; Kingdom of Poland	Principality of Galicia–Volhynia	Ruthenian victory
1236—1237	Mikhail's Volyn campaign: Battle of Cherven	Principality of Volhynia; Cumans; Duchy of Kraków; Duchy of Masovia	Principality of Galicia–Volhynia	Ruthenian victory
1243	Ruthenian raid on Poland	Kingdom of Poland	Principality of Galicia–Volhynia	Disputed (Note: Polish victory claim, Ruthenian victory claim)
1245	Battle of Yaroslavl (1245)	Galician opposition Kingdom of Hungary; Duchy of Kraków	Principality of Galicia–Volhynia; Grand Duchy of Lithuania; Duchy of Masovia	Daniel's victory
1259–1260	Second Mongol invasion of Poland	Polish states	Golden Horde Kingdom of Galicia–Volhynia	Mongol–Ruthenian victory
1264	Battle of Brańsk	Kingdom of Poland: Duchy of Sandomierz; Duchy of Kraków	Kingdom of Galicia–Volhynia; Yotvingians	Polish victory
1265—1266	Polish—Ruthenian War: Battle of Wrota (1266)	Kingdom of Poland: Duchy of Sandomierz; Duchy of Kraków	Kingdom of Galicia–Volhynia; Yotvingians	Polish victory
1279	Ruthenian raid on Poland	Kingdom of Poland	Kingdom of Galicia–Volhynia	Ruthenian victory
1280	Kraków campaign of Leo I of Galicia: Battle of Goźlice	Kingdom of Poland: Duchy of Sandomierz; Duchy of Sieradz	Kingdom of Galicia–Volhynia; Golden Horde	Polish victory
1287–1288	Third Mongol invasion of Poland	Kingdom of Poland Kingdom of Hungary	Golden Horde Kingdom of Galicia–Volhynia	Polish–Hungarian victory
1323	Polish–Hungarian expedition to Ruthenia	Kingdom of Poland Kingdom of Hungary	Kingdom of Galicia–Volhynia	Polish–Hungarian victory: Yuri II Boleslav put on the throne
1340—1341	Polish—Ruthenian War: Battle of the Vistula River (1341)	Kingdom of Poland	Golden Horde Kingdom of Galicia–Volhynia	Polish victory

== Polish–Lithuanian Commonwealth versus Ukrainian Cossacks, Haidamaks and Opryshky ==
Date	War	Belligerents	Belligerents	Result
1591–1593	Kosiński Uprising	Polish–Lithuanian Commonwealth	Zaporozhian Cossacks	Polish-Lithuanian victory
1594–1596	Nalyvaiko Uprising	Polish–Lithuanian Commonwealth	Zaporozhian Cossacks	Polish-Lithuanian victory
1625	Zhmaylo uprising	Polish–Lithuanian Commonwealth	Zaporozhian Cossacks	Treaty of Kurukove
1630	Fedorovych uprising	Polish–Lithuanian Commonwealth	Zaporozhian Cossacks	Treaty of Pereiaslav (1630)
1635	Sulima Uprising	Polish–Lithuanian Commonwealth	Zaporozhian Cossacks	Polish-Lithuanian victory
1637	Pavlyuk uprising	Polish–Lithuanian Commonwealth	Zaporozhian Cossacks	Polish-Lithuanian victory
1638	Ostryanyn uprising	Polish–Lithuanian Commonwealth	Zaporozhian Cossacks	Polish-Lithuanian victory
1648–1657	Khmelnytsky Uprising	Polish–Lithuanian Commonwealth	Cossack Hetmanate Tsardom of Russia	Cossack victory: Emergence of the Cossack Hetmanate and it's vassalisation by the Tsardom of Russia); Beginning of The Ruin
1659	Bohun Uprising	Pro-Polish Cossacks; Polish–Lithuanian Commonwealth	Pro-Russian Cossacks; Tsardom of Russia	Russo-Cossack victory: Initial pro-Polish victory at Konotop; Ivan Vyhovsky flees to Poland after Ivan Bohun's successful pro-Russian uprising
1666–1671	Polish–Cossack–Tatar War (1666–1671)	Polish–Lithuanian Commonwealth; Cossacks	Cossacks; Crimean Khanate	Polish-Lithuanian-Cossack victory
1702–1704	Paliy Uprising	Polish–Lithuanian Commonwealth Tsardom of Russia; Cossack Hetmanate	Cossack rebels	Uprising suppressed by Mazepa's Cossacks: Transfer of Right-Bank Ukraine to the Cossack Hetmanate
1734	1734 Haidamak Uprising	Polish–Lithuanian Commonwealth Tsardom of Russia	Haidamaks	Polish-Lithuanian-Russian victory
1738-1745	Oleksa Dovbush movement: Assault on Bogorodchany	Polish–Lithuanian Commonwealth	Opryshky	Opryshky victory
1750	1750 Haidamak Uprising	Polish–Lithuanian Commonwealth Tsardom of Russia	Haidamaks	Polish-Lithuanian-Russian victory
1768	Koliivshchyna	Polish–Lithuanian Commonwealth Tsardom of Russia	Haidamaks	Polish-Lithuanian-Russian victory

== The Inter-War Period and the UPA ==
Date	War	Belligerents	Belligerents	Result
1918–1919	Polish–Ukrainian War	Second Polish Republic Regional support: Romania (in Bukovina and Pokuttia); Hungary; Czechoslovakia; Strategic support: France	West Ukrainian People's Republic; Ukrainian People's Republic; Hutsul Republic (in Maramureș); Komancza Republic (in Lemkivshchyna until January 1919); Ukrainian Bukovina (in Bukovina, 6–11 November 1919)	Polish victory: Signing of the Treaty of Warsaw
1939–1945	Polish–Ukrainian conflict in Volyn and Galicia	Second Polish Republic (1939); Home Army; Peasant Battalions; National Armed Forces (Poland) Polish Self–Defense; Soviet partisans Schutzmannschaft Battalion 202	OUN (1939); Ukrainian Insurgent Army; Polesia Sich (Ukraine) Kusch Units of the Ukrainian Self–Defense; Ukrainian collaborators	Curzon Line division: Volyn and Galicia incorporated into Soviet Ukraine; Population exchange between Poland and Soviet Ukraine; Completed homogenization after deportation of Poles.; Continued UPA insurgency against Soviet power and post-war Poland
1945–1947	UPA insurgency in post-war Poland	Polish People’s Republic; Soviet Union	Ukrainian Insurgent Army	Polish victory: Liquidation of UPA remnants in post-war Poland; Completed homogenization after deportation of Ukrainians

== Bibliography ==
- Kotlar, Nikolai (2003). Политика южной Руси [The politics of Southern Rus'] (in Russian). Алетейя. ISBN 5-89329-593-5.
- Martin, Janet (2007). Medieval Russia: 980–1584. Second Edition. E-book. Cambridge: Cambridge University Press. ISBN 978-0-511-36800-4.
- Pashuto, Vladimir (1968). Внешняя политика Руси [The foreign policy of Rus'] (in Russian). Moscow: Наука.
- Włodarski, Bronisław (1927), Polityka ruska Leszka białego, vol. III, Lviv: Biblioteka Uniwersytecka w Poznaniu
- Snyder, Timothy (2003). The Reconstruction of Nations: Poland, Ukraine, Lithuania, Belarus, 1569-1999. Yale University Press. ISBN 9780300105865.
- Foryt, Artur (2021). Zawichost 1205 (in Polish). Warszawa: Wydawnictwo Bellona. ISBN 978-83-11-16068-2.
