= Battle of Mikulin (1205) =

- Part of War of the Galician Succession (1205–1245)
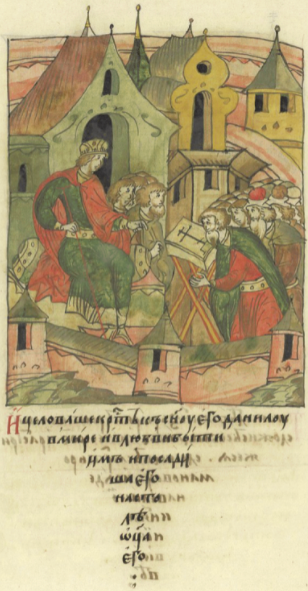
- Boyars swear allegiance to Daniel of Galicia after Roman's death, Illustrated Chronicle of Ivan the Terrible
Date	1205
Location	Mikulin area
Result	Hungarian victory (Note: They eventually defended Halych and repulsed the Olgovichi claims to the throne.)

Belligerents
Principality of Galicia–Volhynia; Kingdom of Hungary	Rostislavichi of Smolensk; Olgovichi of Chernigov

Commanders and leaders
Anna-Euphrosyne; Andrew II of Hungary	Rurik Rostislavich

Casualties and losses
Heavy	Heavy

The Battle of Mikulin (1205) was an armed clash on the Seret River in the Mikulin area, which took place as part of war of the Galician succession after the death of Roman the Great.

The combined forces of Rurik Rostislavich, who had seized the Kyiv throne, and the Olgovichi from Chernihiv advanced on Halych to overthrow the regency of Anna-Euphrosyne over the young Romanovichi, Daniel of Galicia and Vasylko Romanovich. The allied armies encountered Halych and Volynian troops supporting the Romanovichi. After day-long fighting, Daniel's forces retreated to Halych. The support of Hungarian troops, which King Andrew II of Hungary sent to the aid of the Romanovichi, proved decisive. Thanks to this, Halych was successfully defended and the army of Rurik and the Olgovichi abandoned the siege. Hungarian assistance not only strengthened the city's defences, but also prevented the Halych boyars, opposed to the Romanovichi rule, from cooperating with the invaders.

== Bibliography ==
- Dąbrowski, Dariusz (2013). Daniel Romanowicz. Król Rusi (ok. 1201–1264). Biografia polityczna. Avalon. ISBN 9788377300695.
- Foryt, Artur (2021). Zawichost 1205 (in Polish). Warszawa: Wydawnictwo Bellona. ISBN 978-83-11-16068-2.
