= War of the Galician Succession (1205–1245) =

Succession war in the Galician-Volhynian principality

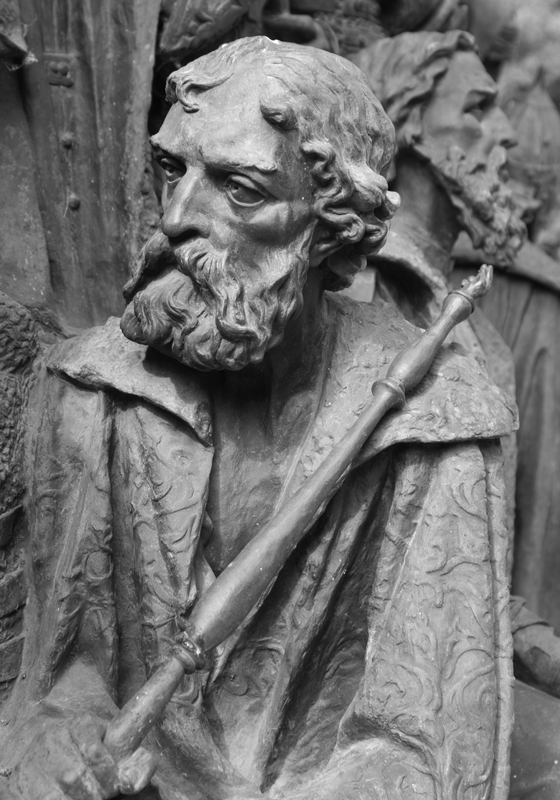
- Daniel Romanovich on the monument Millennium of Russia, Novgorod
Date	19 June 1205 – 17 August 1245
Location	Kingdom of Galicia-Volhynia (Present-day Poland, Ukraine and Belarus)
Result	Romanovichi-led victory

Belligerents
Árpád dynasty (Note: The Árpád dynasty were actively involved in campaigns against Daniel's rivals at the start of the war. This changed since Daniel's increasingly negative attitude towards the Hungarians. Because of this, the sides turned.); Olgovichi; Piast dynasty (Note: The Polish piasts mostly rotated between the sides often putting a spanner in the works for the Hungarians. Of such piasts, it can be mentioned Konrad of Masovia, who once supported Daniel or fought wars with him, and Leszek as similarly with Konrad.); Galician opposition See list of states: Kingdom of Hungary; Duchy of Belz; Principality of Chernigov; Duchy of Kraków; Principality of Kiev; ... and others	Romanovichi dynasty Mstislavichi dynasty

Commanders and leaders
Coloman of Galicia; Andrew; Leszek I the White; Vladimir Igorevich; Michael of Chernigov; Rostislav Mikhailovich	Anna-Euphrosyne; Daniel of Galicia; Vasylko Romanovych; Mstislav Mstislavich "the Daring"

The War of the Galician Succession (Note: Sometimes also known as the Second War of the Galician Succession.) or War for the unification of the Principality of Galicia–Volhynia (Note: Ukrainian: Війна за об'єднання Галицько-Волинського князівства, romanized: Vijna za ob'jednannja Halycjko-Volynsjkoho knjazivstva. Russian: Война за объединение Галицко-Волынского княжества, romanized: Vojna za obʺedinenie Galitsko-Volynskogo knjazhestva.) was a struggle for power over the Principality of Galicia–Volhynia. It took place from 19 June 1205 to 17 August 1245. The conflict was one of the longest wars of succession in Europe, and ended with the Romanovichi clan holding on to power.

The origins of the war can be traced to the death of Roman the Great at the Battle of Zawichost (1205). He left two sons, Daniel (Danylo) and Vasylko (the "Romanovichi", literally "Roman's sons"), who due to being underage were unable to ascend to the throne. The regency of their mother Anna-Euphrosyne, Roman's widow, was not widely accepted, resulting in a succession crisis. A number of contenders became involved in the struggle for power, including the Igorovichi, whom the local boyars invited to Halych (Galicia), hoping to stabilise the situation. The Igorovichi, supported by the Hungarians, initially gained the upper hand, but their brutal rule, including the massacre of boyars, provoked resistance and weakened their position. The Romanovichi, led by regent Anna-Euphrosyne and supported by duke Leszek the White of Sandomierz, the Hungarians and some boyars, attempted to regain power in Halych. In 1211, Daniel was installed on the Halych throne, but the Romanovichi still had to contend with resistance from the Igorevichi and tensions among their own allies. This period was characterised by dynamic changes in alliances, short-lived victories and growing rivalry between the Romanovichi and the Hungarians, who sought full control of Halych.

In 1214, Leszek the White made an agreement with King Andrew II of Hungary in an attempt to divide spheres of influence in the Principality of Halych. This agreement led to a short-lived strengthening of Hungarian influence, but resistance from the Romanovichi faction made it impossible to maintain permanent control over the region. Key clashes, such as the Battle of Halych in 1229, highlighted the fierceness of the fighting, but failed to produce a clear-cut settlement. The situation was further complicated by Mongol incursions in the late 1230s, which weakened both the Ruthenians and their neighbours, forcing the Romanovichi to temporarily move their capital to Kholm (present-day Chełm in Poland). The final years ended in a decisive victory for Daniel Romanovich. On his return from Kholm in 1241, Daniel began to rebuild his position, reclaiming Halych and waging further campaigns against his opponents. The war culminated in the Battle of Yaroslavl in 1245, in which Daniel, supported by the Polovtsians, defeated the forces of Rostislav, Béla IV and Boleslav the Chaste. This victory ended the 40-year struggle for the succession and consolidated the power of the Romanovichi in the Principality of Galicia–Volhynia.

== Background ==
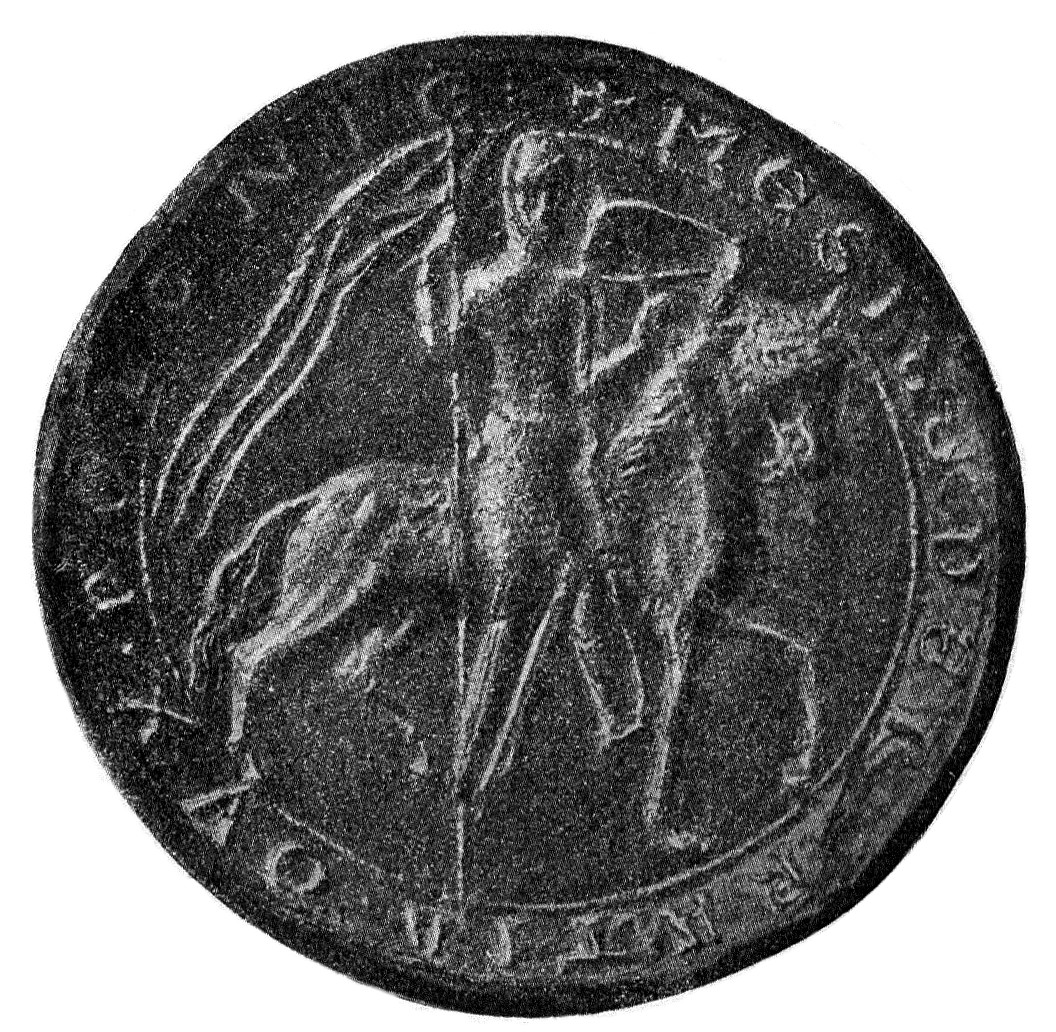
Mieszko's seal from 1145

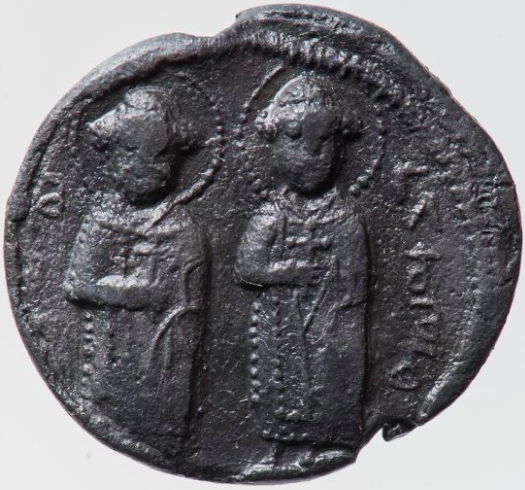
Seal of Roman II the Great

Over the course of the 11th and 12th centuries, the Kingdom of Poland (fragmented after 1138) had several conflicts with Kievan Rus' over the Cherven Cities, strategically located on the borders of both realms. (Note: The first mention of the conflicts between the two states dates back to 981 when Vladimir the Great occupied the Cherven Cities. They were later recaptured by Bolesław the Brave in 1018. In 1031, Jaroslav the Wise took them back from the Poles. However, the Polish forces regained it again under Bolesław the Bold in 1069.) Two separate Rus' appanages emerged in this area: the principalities of Halych (Galicia) and Volhynia. In 1183, thanks to the support of Casimir the Just, prince Roman the Great of Volhynia was established in Berestia (Brest), which started his political career. After Casimir's death, young Leszek the White ascended to the throne of Kraków (symbolising the heart of royal authority before Poland fragmented), prompting Mieszko III the Old to attempt seizing power over Kraków by taking advantage of Leszek's underage age, leading to the Battle of Mozgawa (1195). In this clash, Roman of Volyn' supported Leszek of Sandomierz, which initiated an alliance between the two. Leszek returned the favour to Roman in 1199, supporting him in his fights for the throne of Halych and restoring him to power.

That same year, the latter united the principalities of Galicia and Volhynia to form a new state. Roman quickly consolidated his principality, making it one of the most powerful in Rus', in time even conquering Kyiv. However, in 1205, Roman unexpectedly broke the alliance and invaded Leszek's lands. The reasons for such a hasty decision remain unclear. Some chronicles point to Roman's support of duke Władysław III Spindleshanks of Greater Poland (based in Poznań) in his fight for the throne of Kraków; others to Leszek's possible claim for a tribute, as recorded in the Wielkopolska chronicle. Roman began the campaign with successes, capturing Lublin and Łuków, but at Zawichost his troops encountered the Poles in battle; Roman's forces were completely crushed and the prince himself died, ending his ambitions.

== Phase I of the war 1205–1214: Igorevichi rule and Polish-Hungarian interventions ==
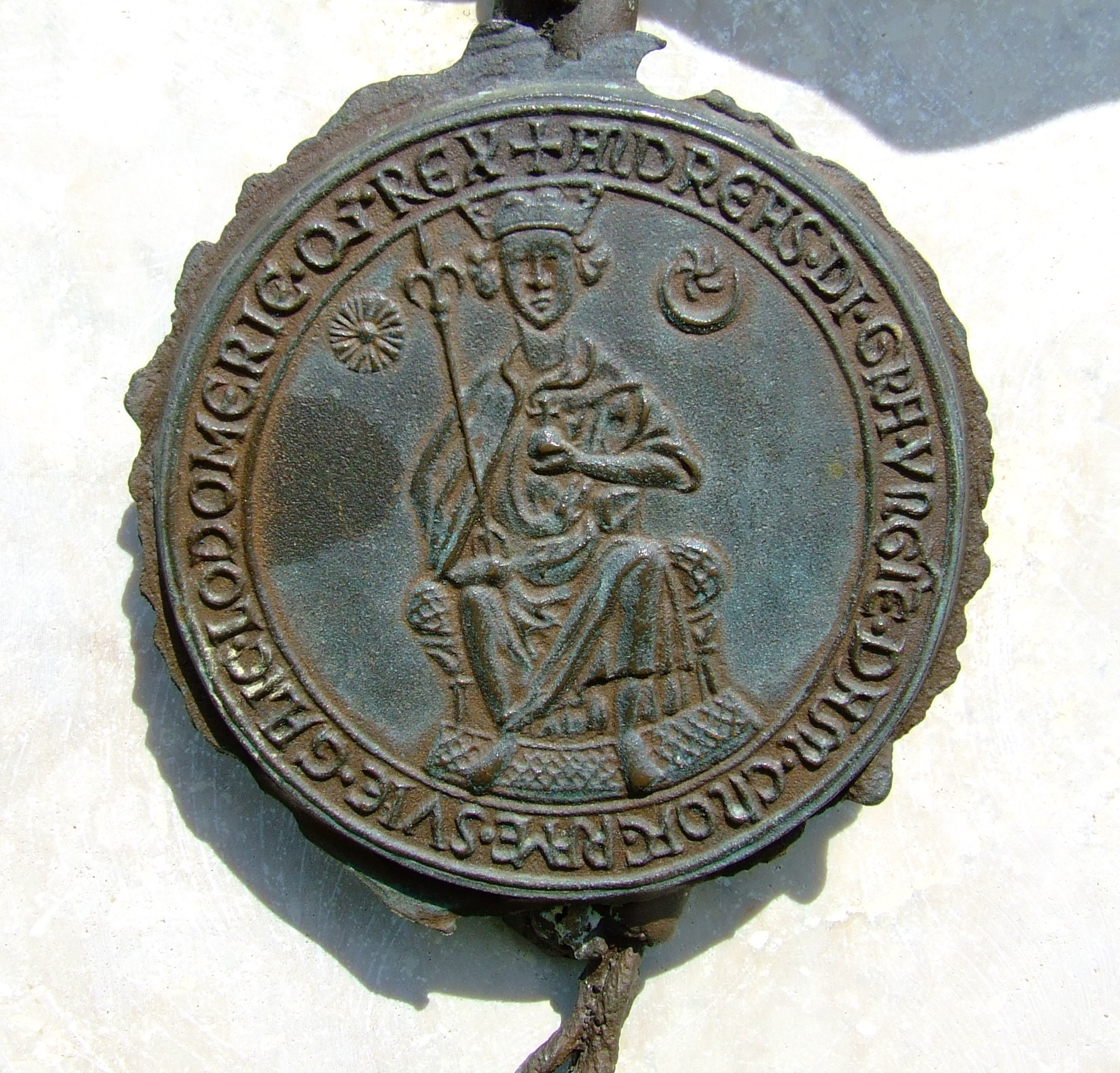
Depiction of the Golden Bulla on the statue of Tóth Andrew II in the Ópusztaszeri National Historical Memorial Park

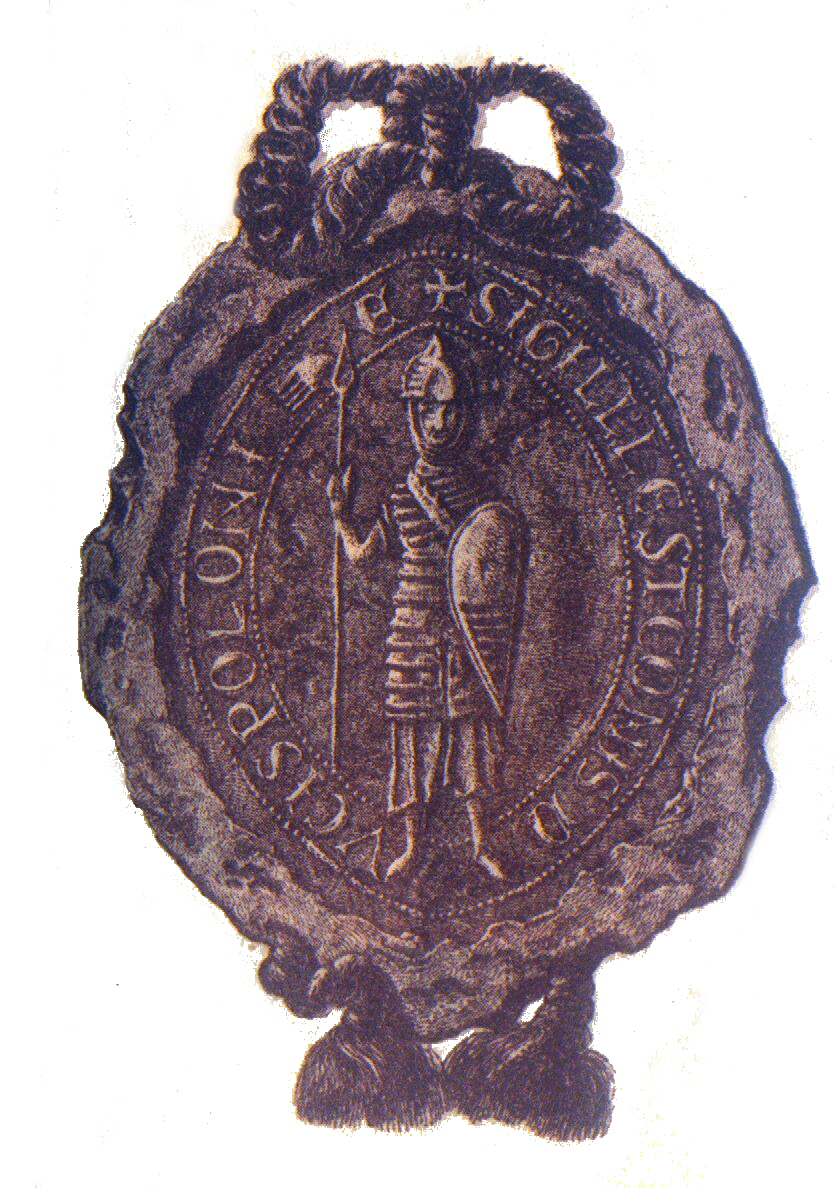
Seal of Leszek the White

After the death of Roman the Great, his young sons, Daniel and Vasylko, called the Romanovichi after their father, inherited a state in political chaos. The return of Roman's political opponents and the claims of various dynasties to Galician and Volhynian regions complicated their situation. At the same time, Rurik Rostislavich, supported by the Olgovichi of Chernigov, invaded the lands of the young princes. In response, Roman's widow Anna Euphrosyne assumed the regency of Galicia–Volhynia, and requested help from King Andrew II of Hungary, who agreed to provide assistance. Despite the defeat of the Hungarian army at Mikulin, they managed to defend Halych against the allied forces of Rurik and the Olgovichi, temporarily repelling their claims. However, the situation deteriorated again in 1206, forcing the Romanovichi to flee.

After a series of political perturbations, the boyars elected Vladimir Igorevich to the Halych throne. The Hungarians and Poles attempted to stabilise their territories through intervention, which led to the division of Galician and Volhynian lands into spheres of influence. Hungarian intervention handed power in Halych to Benedict, whose rule quickly collapsed. The boyars of Halych resumed their allegiance with the Igorevichi, who, however, brutally dealt with them for an unknown reason by massacring them.

A surviving boyar, Vladislav Kormilchyc, called on the Hungarians and Poles for help. A joint expedition began, which initially ended with the defeat of the Hungarians at the River Luta. Eventually, however, Polish-Hungarian forces crushed the Igorevichi army at the Battle of Zvenigorod (1211), temporarily restoring stability in Halych. After Zvenigorod, Vladimir Igorevich's sons Roman, Rostislav and Sviatoslav were taken prisoner. In an act of retaliation for the earlier massacre, the boyars ransomed them and then hanged them. In 1212, the boyars expelled regent Euphrosyne from Halych, possibly due to her attempts to curb the power and influence of the boyars; nevertheless, a subsequent Hungarian intervention allowed her to return. In 1213, Euphrosyne once again lost power due to the actions of the boyars, who invited Peresopnytsian prince Mstislav the Nemesis to the throne.

The situation prompted the King of Hungary to launch another armed expedition, after which he installed Vladislav Kormilchyc as governor on the throne of Halych. In response, Euphrosyne turned to Leszek the White for help. The Polish princeps defeated Vladislav at the river Bóbrka, although he failed to capture Halych. But in retaliation he carried out a raid, plundering Galicia–Volhynia. As a result of this, the Poles and Hungarians concluded a treaty in Spiš, dividing Galicia–Volhynia into spheres of influence — the Poles were to take control of Volodymyr and the Hungarians of Halych.

== Phase II of the war 1214–1227: Mstislav's appearance in Halych ==
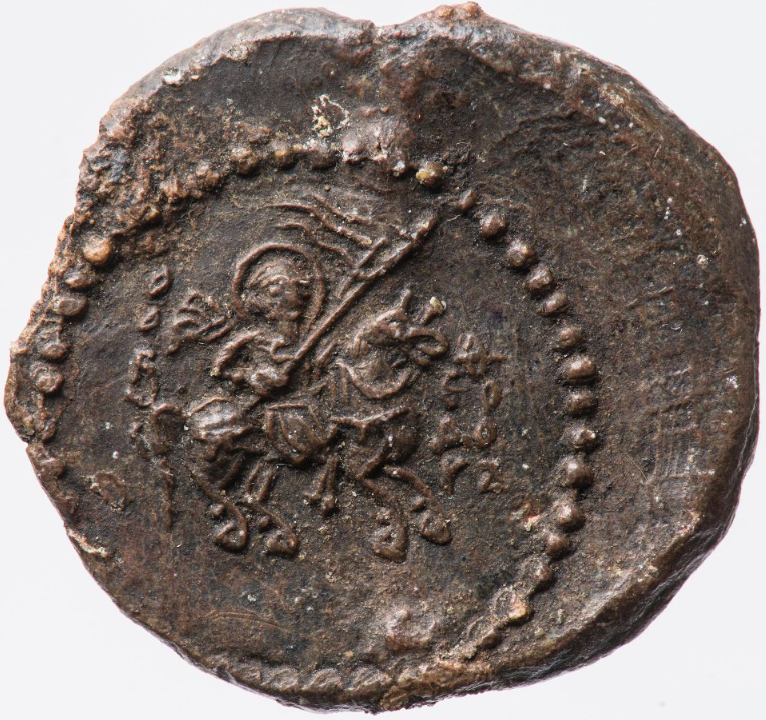
Seal of Mstislav Mstislavich

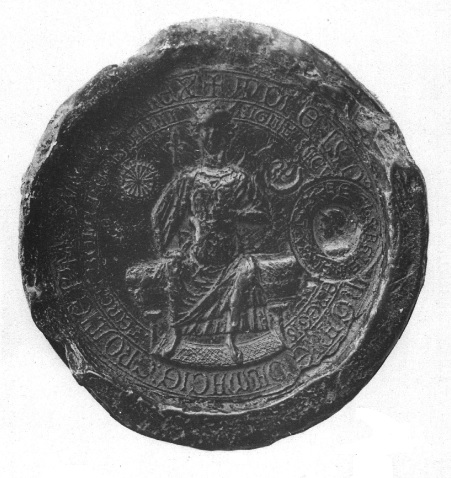
Seal of Andrew II, 1224

The new arrangement for the division of influence in the Galicia-Volhynian principality quickly collapsed. In 1215, Daniel Romanovich (who had just reached adulthood and succeeded the regency of Euphrosyne) was supported by Leszek the White who, against the wishes of King Andrew II of Hungary, occupied Volyn's capital city of Volodymyr. This action was regarded by the Hungarians as a violation of the treaty, leading to antagonism. Meanwhile, prince Mstislav Mstislavich of Novgorod joined the conflict, and formed an anti-Hungarian coalition with the Romanovichi. Leszek, perceiving the threat, tried to extricate himself from the situation by making a deal with Hungary, which led to the outbreak of the so-called Polish-Hungarian-Ruthenian War (1218–1221).

The war began with Leszek's defeat in the Battle of Sukha Dorogva River (spring 1218). With the support of the Hungarians, Mstislav and Daniel were defeated at the Battle of Halych (1219). In 1220, Leszek conducted another expedition, which ended indecisively. In 1221, Mstislav launched a new offensive that ended in defeat. A few months later, the Novgorodian prince, reinforced by Rus' reinforcements, won a decisive victory at the second Battle of Halych (1221). The Hungarian crown prince Coloman was taken prisoner in battle. The peace negotiations ended favourably for Andrew II of Hungary; for Leszek the White, it was a complete defeat, resulting in the failure of his Rus' policy.

In 1223, a new threat appeared on the southern periphery of Kievan Rus' — the Mongol invasion, which culminated in the disastrous Battle of the Kalka River. This defeat, combined with the complete decimation of Rus' forces, significantly weakened the defensive capabilities of the Rus' princes there. The weakening of Kievan Rus' created new opportunities for political reshuffling in the ongoing struggle for the Halych succession. This time, Daniel Romanovich formed an alliance with Leszek the White, while Mstislav Mstislavich tied himself to Hungary. Mstislav, trying to take the initiative, suffered a series of defeats, starting with a battle in an unknown location, and ending with an unsuccessful expedition to Volhynia. The situation changed again, with Leszek reverting to co-operation with the Hungarians, while Daniel tied up with Mstislav. The new arrangement led to another campaign in which Lesser Poland (Sandomierz and Kraków) and Hungarian forces took part. However, it ended in a severe defeat at the Battle of Zvenigorod (1227), which further widened the anarchy in Halych.

== Phase III of the war 1227–1241: Daniel's battles against the Hungarians ==
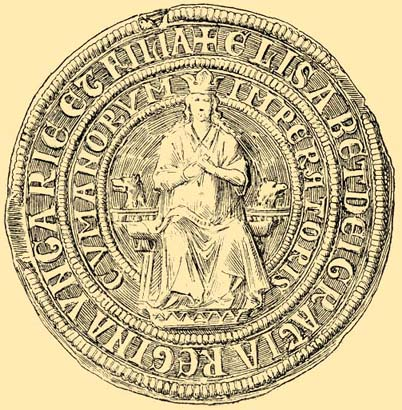
Seal of Béla's daughter-in-law, Elizabeth the Cuman

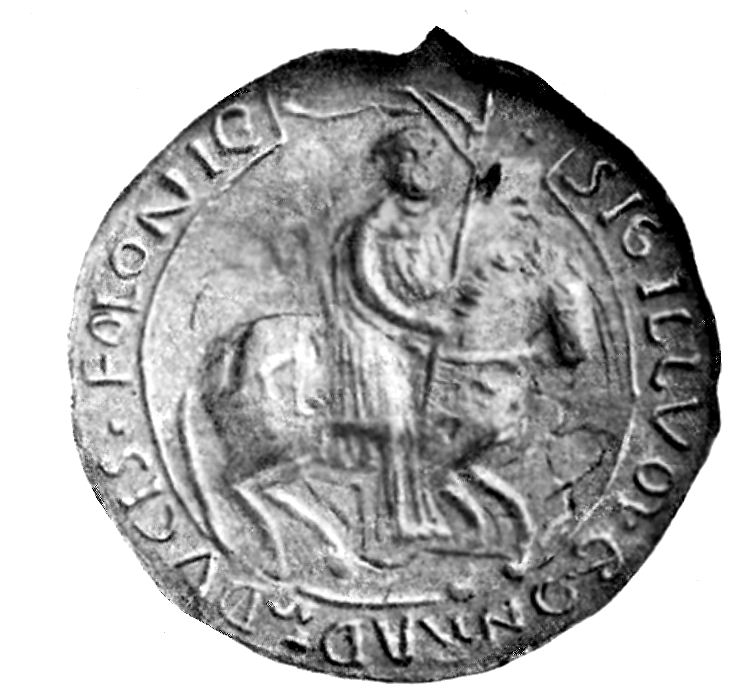
Konrad I of Masovia seal

In 1227, an assassination attempt took place at Gąsawa (the Gąsawa massacre), which resulted in the death of Leszek the White. This event severely weakened the Hungarian Árpádian policy towards Halych Rus', as the Hungarians lost a key ally in the region. The death of Leszek, who was the last Polish princeps, opened up new political opportunities. Daniel Romanovich, taking advantage of this situation, began fighting for Kyiv. In 1229, Daniel allied himself with Leszek's brother, Konrad of Masovia, and supported him during the siege of Kalisz. However, the expedition ended in defeat. At the same time, Daniel had to face rivals in the battle for Halych. After the death of Mstislav Mstislavich in 1227, power in the principality of Galicia fell to the Hungarian king Andrew, which was a failure of Daniel's policy. Although he had been on good terms with Mstislav, Daniel could not become his successor to the throne of Halych, a major setback. In 1230, Daniel took advantage of the absence of the pro-Hungarian boyar Sudyslav and attacked the Principality of Halych, taking the town without a fight. In response, the Hungarians organised a retaliatory expedition, but it was unsuccessful. In 1231, Daniel got rid of his political enemy Alexander Vsevolodovich Belsky, forcing him to flee to Hungary. Alexander agitated there in his favour, which resulted in another Hungarian expedition. This time the Hungarians defeated Daniel's weakened forces. In 1233, Daniel attempted to mediate between the Ruthenian princes in Kyiv, but during this visit to the capital of Kievan Rus', his own lands were invaded by the forces of Andrew and Alexander Belsky. The Battle of Shumsk ensued, which ended inconclusively. In 1234, harassed by successive Hungarian invasions, Daniel decided to strike at Halych. The expedition was successful — Daniel captured the town, strengthening his position and eliminating the Hungarian threat for the time being.

In 1234, Daniel Romanovich began supporting prince Vladimir IV of Kiev in his conflict with Michael of Chernigov, leader of the Olgovichi clan. Daniel's first expedition against him ended in defeat. In 1235 he made another attempt by unsuccessfully besieging Chernigov, and Daniel was forced to retreat. During the retreat, Vladimir's and Daniel's forces were attacked by Izyaslav IV, a partisan of Michael. The allies' decision to fight the Battle of Torchevsk ended in total defeat. Daniel was taken prisoner, but managed to escape from it. Meanwhile, in Halych, Daniel's defeats did not fill the boyars with optimism; they undertook an attempt to remove him from power and install Michael of Chernigov on the Halych throne. In 1235 a new king, Béla IV, was crowned in Hungary. Daniel formed an alliance with him, which opened the way for further actions. Together with his brother, he launched an attack on Halych, but failed to achieve his aims. In 1236, the Halychians organised a retaliatory expedition against the Kamenets region, which was repulsed by Daniel. In the same year, Daniel concluded an alliance with the Silesian Piasts; this arrangement put Konrad of Masovia at a disadvantage. Then Konrad began to hold secret talks with Michael; he decided to attack Daniel with his new ally. However, Michael and Konrad's joint invasion ended in defeat. Konrad was defeated at Cherven, and Michael's offensive bogged down. The conflict ended with the conclusion of the status quo, which was advantageous for Michael, but a defeat for Konrad of Masovia.

Map of Kievan Rus' in 1237. The names of tribes and peoples are in bold and yellow, the names of countries outside Kievan Rus' are in bold and black.

Konrad of Mazovia, wishing to resolve the Drohiczyn problem (Daniel had staked his claim to the region in 1237), decided to use the Order of Dobrzyń in a manner analogous to his actions of 1226 in the matter of the Prussians. However, this plan did not last long. In 1238, Romanovich gathered his forces and struck at Drohiczyn, winning a crushing victory at the Battle of Drohiczyn, which ended the Order's activities in the region. That same year, Michael left his son Rostislav Mikhailovich in Halych to organise a loot raid into Lithuania. Taking advantage of this weakness, Daniel directed his forces towards Halych, capturing the capital of the principality. Meanwhile, the year 1240 brought dramatic events in Rus': the devastating Mongol invasion of Kievan Rus'. After a siege, they captured Kyiv, marking the fall of Kievan Rus' and ushering in a period of Mongol domination in Rus'. They then invaded Hungary and Poland with spectacular victories — defeating the Hungarians at the Battle of Mohi Plain and the Poles at the Battle of Legnica. Forced to flee from the Mongol onslaught, Daniel and his brother Vasylko first took refuge in Hungary and then in Masovia, where they were given shelter by Bolesław I of Masovia. After the situation calmed down and the Mongols receded, Daniel returned to his lands to rebuild his state after the destruction. It seems that around this time, Daniel made Kholm (modern Chełm), which he had founded in 1237, his new capital.

== Phase IV of the war 1241–1245: Victory of the Romanovichi at the Battle of Yaroslavl ==
After Daniel Romanovych had recaptured Halych, Rostislav Mikhailovich, seeking support, turned to King Béla IV of Hungary for help, becoming engaged to his daughter Anna. In the meantime, Daniel had improved relations with Konrad of Masovia, and together they supported him in his actions against Bolesław the Chaste of Sandomierz. Daniel's expedition (c. 1243) to Lublin ended in defeat, however — his forces were smashed by Rostislav and his allies at the Siena River. This clash proved to be only a prelude to a larger campaign in 1245. Both sides prepared by gathering troops and seeking allies for what would later turn out to be the decisive clash. The Olgovichi army of Rostislav, supported by the Hungarian troops of Béla IV and the Sandomierz forces of Bolesław the Chaste, set out in the summer of 1245. Daniel and his brother Vasylko, knowing of the impending threat, tried to secure support from Mindaugas, a Lithuanian prince, and Konrad of Masovia, but according to the Galician–Volhynian Chronicle, neither side took part in the battle. However, to the aid of the Romanovichi came the Polovtsians, who played an important role in the clash.

The battle began on 17 August 1245 near Yaroslavl (modern Jarosław). The attack was initiated by the Olgovichi army of Rostislav, which was supported by the Polish commander Florian Wojciechowicz and the Hungarian general File. However, in the course of the fighting, the Hungarian forces were shattered, which tipped the balance of victory to the Romanovichi side of Daniel and Vasylko. The defeat of the Rostislav's coalition was a watershed event, ending the 40-year struggle for succession in Halych and sealing the victory of the Romanovichi. The conflict was officially ended in 1247 with a peace that consolidated Daniel Romanovych's power in the region.

== Overview of princely clans involved ==
Rus' princely clans involved in the War of the Galician Succession (1205–1245)

Olgovichi of Chernigov; Oleg I of Chernigov	Mstislavichi; Mstislav I
Vsevolod II	Sviatoslav; Olgovich	Iziaslavichi of Volhynia; Iziaslav II	Rostislavichi of Smolensk; Rostislav I
Sviatoslav III	Igorevichi	Mstislav II	Mstislav of Smolensk	Roman I	Riurik
Vsevolod Chermnyi	Anna-Euphrosyne	Romanovichi of Galicia; Roman the Great
Michael of Chernigov	Elena Romanovna	Mstislav Mstislavich	Mstislav III
Rostislav Mikhailovich	Vasylko	Daniel	Anna

Died before the conflict began
Cause of the conflict: death of Roman the Great, prince of Galicia and Volhynia (1205)

== See also ==
- Mongol invasion of Kievan Rus' (1237–1241): the Golden Horde's conquest of Kievan Rus'
- Kuremsa war (1252–1258) between Galicia–Volhynia and the Golden Horde

== Sources ==
- Chrzanowski, Marek (2021). Leszek Biały, książę krakowski i sandomierski, princeps Poloniae (ok. 1184-23/24 listopada 1227). Kraków: Avalon. ISBN 978-83-7730-294-1.
- Dąbrowski, Dariusz (2013). Daniel Romanowicz. Król Rusi (ok. 1201–1264). Biografia polityczna. Avalon. ISBN 978-83-7730-069-5.
- Érszegi, Géza; Solymosi, László (1981). "Az Árpádok királysága, 1000–1301 [The Monarchy of the Árpáds, 1000–1301]". In Solymosi, László (ed.). Magyarország történeti kronológiája, I: a kezdetektől 1526-ig [Historical Chronology of Hungary, Volume I: From the Beginning to 1526] (in Hungarian). Akadémiai Kiadó. pp. 79–187. ISBN 963-05-2661-1.
- Foryt, Artur (2021). Zawichost 1205 (in Polish). Warszawa: Wydawnictwo Bellona. ISBN 978-83-11-16068-2.
- Kostomarov, Nikolai (1998) [1873]. "Knyaz Danilo Romanovich of Galicia". Русская история в жизнеописаниях её главнейших деятелей [Russian history in the biographies of its most important figures] (in Russian). Vol. 1. Series: Великая Россия (Great Russia). Moscow: Рипол-классик. pp. 150–180. ISBN 5-7905-0214-8. Archived from the original on 10 December 2015.
- Martin, Janet (2007). Medieval Russia: 980–1584. Second Edition. E-book. Cambridge: Cambridge University Press. ISBN 978-0-511-36800-4.
- Pashuto, Vladimir (1950). Grekov, Boris (ed.). Очерки по истории Галицко-Волынской Руси [Essays on the history of Galician-Volhynian Rus'] (in Russian). Moscow: Издательство академии наук СССР. pp. 191–220.
- Perfecky, George A. (1973). The Galician-Volynian Chronicle. München: Wilhelm Fink Verlag.
- Plokhy, Serhii (2006). The Origins of the Slavic Nations: Premodern Identities in Russia, Ukraine, and Belarus (PDF). New York: Cambridge University Press. pp. 10–15. ISBN 978-0-521-86403-9. Archived (PDF) from the original on 6 June 2011.
- Włodarski, Bronisław (1927), Polityka ruska Leszka białego (in Polish), vol. III, Lwów: Biblioteka Uniwersytecka w Poznaniu
