= Battle of Sukha Dorogva River =

- Part of War of the Galician Succession (1205–1245) and Polish-Ruthenian-Hungarian war (1218–1221)
Date	Spring 1218
Location	Sukha Dorogva river
Result	Ruthenian victory

Belligerents
Principality of Volhynia	Duchy of Kraków; Duchy of Sandomierz

Commanders and leaders
Daniel of Galicia	Leszek the White

Strength
More than a Polish army	Unknown

Casualties and losses
Light	Many captured or killed

Battle of Sukha Dorogva River was an armed clash between the armies of Daniel Romanovich and the forces of Leszek the White, following Daniel's political actions. A key element of his strategy was to conclude an alliance with Mstislav Mstislavich, which made it possible to regain lost lands.

This alliance was met with displeasure by Leszek the White, who perceived it as an attempt to make the Romanovichi independent from Polish sovereignty. In response, the Duke of Kraków organised a retaliatory expedition. In the spring of 1218, Polish troops invaded the lands along the Bug River, but the Ruthenian forces, led by the boyars Gavrilo Dushilovich, Semyon Ohiyevich and Vasyl Gavrilovich, defeated them. Poles were forced to retreat as far as the Wieprz River, and Daniel's triumphant army returned to Vladimir, leading the captured captives. The Galician-Volhynian Chronicle states that the site of the battle was Sukha Dorogva River.

== Bibliography ==
- Dąbrowski, Dariusz (2013). Daniel Romanowicz. Król Rusi (ok. 1201–1264). Biografia polityczna. Avalon. ISBN 9788377300695.
