= Battle of Halych (1221) =

- Part of War of the Galician Succession (1205–1245)
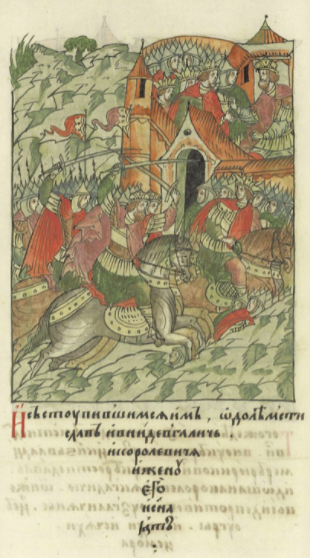
- Mstislav expels the Hungarian prince from Halych
Date	24 March 1221
Location	Halych
Result	Ruthenian victory

Belligerents
Novgorod Republic; Principality of Volhynia	Kingdom of Hungary; Duchy of Kraków; Duchy of Sandomierz

Commanders and leaders
Daniel of Galicia; Mstislav Mstislavich	File Szeretvai (POW)

Battle of Halych (1221) was an armed clash as part of the Galician War of Succession, which took place between a coalition of Ruthenian princes supported by the Polovtsians and Hungarian-Polish forces led by the voivode File.

== Battle ==
The coalition of Ruthenian princes, led by Mstislav Mstislavich, formed two main battle groups, supported by troops of the Polovtsians. The Hungarian-Polish forces deployed in two battle lines, with the Hungarian File troops supported by the Halychians on one wing and the Poles on the other. The battle began with a strike by the Poles, which forced Vladimir Rurykovich's unit to retreat. However, at the decisive moment, thanks to the attack of the Polovtsians and the return of some of the Ruthenian troops, Mstislav managed to tip the balance of power. The Hungarian and Polish forces were shattered and the voivode File was taken prisoner. The Galician-Volhynian Chronicle describes the moment as follows:

[Ugrian] Uz in the eye. And he fell from his horse, and they took his body and mourned for him. And the next day, on the eve of the [Annunciation] of the Holy Virgin, Mstislav came in the morning to the proud Filya and the Ugrians with the Poles, and there was a heavy battle between them, and Mstislav won. When the Ugrians and Poles fled, many of them were beaten and the proud Filya was captured by the peasant Dobrynin. But he was kidnapped by the deceitful [boyar] Zhyroslav, who was exposed, and because of him, [Filya], he destroyed his fatherland.

— Galician–Volhynian Chronicle c. 1290

After the victory, Mstislav proceeded to lay siege to Halych, where the Hungarian king Coloman and his wife Salomea took refuge. After a brief resistance, the crew, deprived of water supplies, surrendered the city. Mstislav, as a humanitarian gesture, supplied water to the besieged, which contributed to the surrender. The capture of Halych and the capture of Coloman and Salomea was a significant triumph for the Rus' coalition, and the event had a significant impact on the subsequent succession struggle in the region. The Galician–Volhynian Chronicle afterwards describes the capture of the city as follows:

And when Mstislav won, he went to Galich, and they fought for the city gates. And then [the Hungarians] ran out to the church vaults, and others climbed up on ropes, and 3 of their horses were captured. The fortification was built on the church, and they shot and threw stones at the townspeople, [but] they were exhausted from thirst, because there was no water in them. And when Mstislav arrived, they surrendered to him and were led out of the church.

— Galician–Volhynian Chronicle c. 1290

== Bibliography ==
- Dąbrowski, Dariusz (2013). Daniel Romanowicz. Król Rusi (ok. 1201–1264). Biografia polityczna. Avalon. ISBN 9788377300695.
