= Battle of Yaroslavl (1245) =

Battle involving Poland against Galycia-Volhynia in 1245

- Part of War of the Galician Succession (1205–1245)
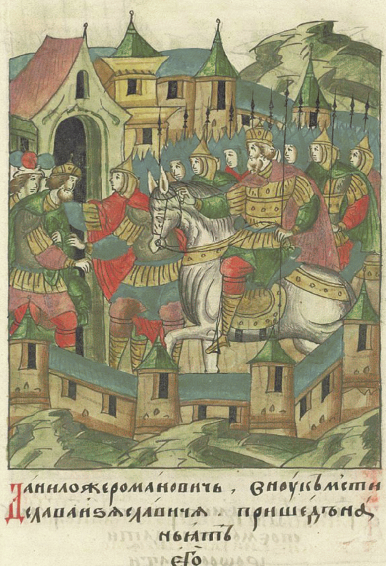
- Daniel of Galicia capturing Rostislav after the battle
Date	17 August 1245
Location	Jarosław
Result	Daniel's victory

Belligerents
Principality of Galicia-Volhynia; Grand Duchy of Lithuania; Duchy of Masovia; Cumans	Galician opposition Kingdom of Hungary; Duchy of Kraków

Commanders and leaders
Daniel of Galicia; Vasylko Romanovych; Mindaugas; Konrad I of Masovia	Rostislav Mikhailovich; File Szeretvai (executed); Florian Wojciechowicz (executed)

Casualties and losses
Light	Many captured and killed

The Battle of Yaroslavl (1245) was a battle fought on 17 August 1245 near San next to the town of Yaroslavl, between the Kingdom of Galicia–Volhynia led by Daniel of Galicia and Vasylko Romanovych supported by the Cumans and the Galician opposition supported by Hungarians and Poles. The battle resulted in the defeat of the Galician opposition.

== Background ==
The year 1245 was a period of strife in the Ruthenian lands, particularly in the principality of Galicia-Volhynia. After the death of Prince Roman of Galicia, the struggle for control of the area continued. The main roles in these events were played by Roman's sons, Daniel and Vasylko Romanovich, and Rostislav Mikhailovich, who laid claim to the Halych throne. Rostislav gained the support of his father-in-law, the Hungarian king Béla IV, and local boyars dissatisfied with Romanovich rule.

The forces of Rostislav, having concentrated in Małopolska, moved to the land of Przemyśl, where they laid siege to Yaroslav. The troops took up positions around the castle, erecting siege machines and preparing for a possible assault. There was an atmosphere of tension and anticipation in the siege camp, punctuated by minor clashes with the castle's garrison. Meanwhile, the Romanovich army, commanded by Daniel and Vasylko, marched towards Yaroslavl, hoping to break up the forces of Roscislav. The army, having crossed the San River, advanced towards the enemy encampment. Earlier, an advance reconnaissance detachment, commanded by courtly Andrew, informed the besiegers of the approaching relief. Upon reaching the site, the Romanovichs' troops began to form battle formation in preparation for the clash.

== Battle ==
The battle began with a dynamic strike by the forces of Rostislav. His cavalry, consisting of Ruthenian, Hungarian and Lesser Polish troops, advanced through a ravine towards Daniel's forces. Rostislav hoped to quickly smash the enemy and push them towards the river, where the terrain difficulties were to make it impossible to develop defensive formations. However, a detachment of courtly Andrew stood in the way of this charge, which shielded Daniel's main force. A fierce battle ensued, in which Rostislav's cavalry began to gain the upper hand. Seeing the threat, Daniel sent a detachment of good warriors led by Vasilek and other trusted commanders to assist Andrew. Despite the support, this detachment was forced to retreat towards the river.

In the meantime, Daniel, taking advantage of the moment gained, managed to set up his forces in battle formation. Seeing that the infantry of Rostislav left at the castle would not be able to quickly support their commander, the Romanovs launched a counterattack. On one wing Vasylko attacked the Małopolans. Despite initial resistance, the Volhynians began to gain the upper hand, pushing the Poles from their positions. On the other wing, Daniel personally led a charge against a Hungarian unit led by File. The battle was extremely fierce, and the Hungarian troops initially managed to repel the attack. Daniel himself was almost captured by his opponents, but with the help of his commanders he managed to retreat. It was only the second charge, carried out with greater vigour, that managed to break the Hungarian array. File's ensign was shattered and the commander himself was forced to withdraw from the battlefield.

The final phase of the battle took place near the castle. Daniel and his troops made a third, decisive charge on the retreating Rostislav troops. The enemy army's array was completely shattered. Vasylko's forces on the other wing crushed the Małopolans, forcing them to flee. The combined Romanovich troops began a pursuit of the survivors of the Rostislav army. Rostislav himself, seeing inevitable defeat, threw himself into flight with the remnants of his army.

== Aftermath ==
The battlefield was strewn with the bodies of the dead and wounded. Many prisoners fell into the hands of the Romanowiczes, including Filia and other important commanders. Daniel and Wasylko, standing on a barrow opposite Yaroslav, watched the battlefield, celebrating the triumph. The victors did not spare many prisoners - some of them, including Filia, were executed on Daniel's orders. Despite this, some of the boyars were released as part of the later negotiations.

== Bibliography ==
- Foryt, Artur (2021). Zawichost 1205 (in Polish). Warszawa: Wydawnictwo Bellona. ISBN 978-83-11-16068-2.
- Dąbrowski, Dariusz (2013). Daniel Romanowicz. Król Rusi (ok. 1201–1264). Biografia polityczna. Avalon. ISBN 9788377300695.
