= Battle of Shumsk (1233) =

Battle in 1233 of the War of Succession

- Part of War of the Galician Succession (1205–1245)
Date	1233
Location	Shumsk
Result	See § Aftermath

Belligerents
Duchy of Volhynia	Kingdom of Hungary

Commanders and leaders
Daniel of Galicia; Vasylko Romanovich	Andrew II of Hungary; Alexander Vsevolodovich

Casualties and losses
Light	Heavy

Battle of Shumsk (1233) was an armed clash between the forces of Daniel of Galicia and Vasylko Romanovich and the Hungarian army led by king Andrew, supported by Alexander Vsevolodovich and the Halych boyars. The battle was part of the struggle for control of Halych, forming part of the Romanovichs' rivalry with Hungary for power in the region.

== Background ==
In 1233, the situation in Kievan Rus' was tense due to the rivalry for control of Halych. Daniel of Galicia and Vasylko Romanovich, supported by Vladimir IV of Kiev, posed a threat to Hungarian influence in the region. King Andrew II of Hungary, supported by Alexander Vsevolodovich and the Halych boyars, decided to launch a preventive campaign to weaken the Romanovichs and demonstrate their strength. The Hungarian-Halycian army moved north-east, reaching as far as Beloberez, south of the Sluch River. There their presence was spotted by Daniel's guards, led by one of his boyars.

== Battle ==
he first clashes took place at the Dernava River, where the Hungarians forced the Volhynian troops to retreat. Daniel, after conferring with Vladimir of Kiev, decided to advance against the enemy. The two armies met at Shumsk, by the White River. Initially, the Hungarians and their allies attacked the wings of the Romanovich army, which caused confusion in Daniel's ranks. Despite this, his troops managed to mount an effective counter-attack — Daniel personally led the assault on the rear of the Halych forces, while Vasylko repelled the Hungarians, capturing the banner of king Andrew. In the midst of the battle, Daniel almost fell captive when his mount was wounded, but managed to retreat. Although the battle was fierce and both sides suffered losses, the Hungarians failed to hold their positions and eventually retreated towards Halych. The Romanovich forces held the battlefield, giving them a strategic victory. The Hungarians suffered heavy losses.

== Aftermath ==
The victory at Shumsk strengthened the position of Daniel and Vasilko Romanovichs in Rus. According to Artur Foryt, the battle ended without winner. The Galician-Volhynian Chronicle describes the battle as a key clash that ended on 3 April 1233, Holy Saturday, confirming the Romanovich advantage in the region.

== Bibliography ==
- Foryt, Artur (2021). Zawichost 1205 (in Polish). Warszawa: Wydawnictwo Bellona. ISBN 978-83-11-16068-2.
- Dąbrowski, Dariusz (2013). Daniel Romanowicz. Król Rusi (ok. 1201–1264). Biografia polityczna. Avalon. ISBN 9788377300695.
