= List of wars between Piast Poland and Kievan Rus' =

This is a list of wars between Piast Poland and Kievan Rus', from the 10th to the 13th century.

Polish victory
Kievan Rus' victory
Another result*

*e.g. result unknown or indecisive/inconclusive, result of internal conflict inside Piast Poland or Kievan Rus' in which the other intervened, status quo ante bellum, or a treaty or peace without a clear result.

| Date | Conflict | Piast Poland and allies | Kievan Rus' and allies | Result |
|---|---|---|---|---|
| 981 | Vladimir the Great's Polish Campaign | Civitas Schinesghe | Kievan Rus' | Kievan Rus' victory |
| 1013 | Bolesław the Brave's expedition to Kievan Rus | Civitas Schinesghe | Kievan Rus' | Polish victory |
| 1017 | Yaroslav the Wise's raid of gord | Civitas Schinesghe | Kievan Rus' | Polish victory |
| 1018 | Bolesław I's intervention in the Kievan succession crisis | Civitas Schinesghe; Pro-Sviatopolk Kievan Rus' | Pro-Yaroslav Kievan Rus' | Temporary joint victory for Poland and Sviatopolk: Poles left Kiev; acquired Cherven Cities; Yaroslav ousted Sviatopolk from Kiev |
| 1022 | Yaroslav the Wise's attack on Brest | Civitas Schinesghe | Kievan Rus' | Polish victory |
| 1030–1031 | Yaroslav the Wise invasion in Poland(German-Polish War) | Kingdom of Poland | Kievan Rus' | Kievan Rus' victory: Kievan Rus' recovered the Cherven Cities |
| 1065–1069 | Rebellion of Vseslav of Polotsk: Sieges of Pskov and Novgorod (1065–1067); Battle on the Nemiga River (1067); Kiev uprising of 1068; Intervention by Bolesław II the Bold (1069) | Principality of Kiev; Principality of Chernigov; Principality of Pereyaslavl; Kingdom of Poland (1069) | Principality of Polotsk | Allied victory: Principality of Polotsk defeated (1067); Brief Vseslav reign in Kiev (1068–May 1069); Polish intervention (May 1069); Restoration of Iziaslav I of Kiev (May 1069) |
| 1076–1077 | Kievan succession crisis: Casus belli: death of Sviatoslav Yaroslavich (26 December 1076); Vsevolod besieged Iziaslav in Volyn (1077); Boris Sviatoslavich captured Chernigov, but Vsevolod ousted him (May 1077); Iziaslav recovered Kiev with Polish support (July 1077) | Iziaslav Yaroslavich; Bolesław II of Poland Boris Sviatoslavich | Vsevolod Yaroslavich | Compromise: Iziaslav and Vsevolod concluded peace; Iziaslav recovered Kiev with Polish help (July 1077); Vsevolod retained Chernigov; Sons of Sviatoslav exiled to Tmutorakan |
| 1092 | Vasilko Rostislavich's raid on Poland | Kingdom of Poland | Kievan Rus' | Kievan Rus' victory |
| 1120—1125 | Polish-Ruthenian war (1120—1125): Kievan-Cuman raid on Poland (1120); Battle of Wysokie (1122); Siege of Volodymyr (1123); Battle of Wilichów (1124) | Kingdom of Poland | Kievan Rus' | Polish victory (Note: In the end, after the Battle of Wilichów, Bolesław III Wrymouth defeated Vladimirko Volodarovich) |
| 1142-1143 | Vsevolod's raid on Poland | Kingdom of Poland | Kievan Rus' | Kievan Rus' victory |
| 1163 | Polish raid on Rus' | Kingdom of Poland | Kievan Rus' | Polish victory |
| 1182–1183 | War for Brest | Kingdom of Poland | Kievan Rus' | Polish victory |
| 1192 | Battle of Drohiczyn | Kingdom of Poland | Kievan Rus' | Polish victory |

== See also ==
- List of wars involving Kievan Rus'
- List of wars and battles involving Galicia–Volhynia
- List of wars involving the Principality of Moscow
- Muscovite–Lithuanian Wars
- List of wars involving the Polish–Lithuanian Commonwealth
- List of wars involving Poland
- List of armed conflicts involving Poland against Ukraine
- List of armed conflicts involving Poland against Russia

== Bibliography ==
- Karamzin, Nikolay (1824). История Государства Российского [History of the Russian state]. Volume II, Chapter IX.
- Martin, Janet (2007). Medieval Russia: 980–1584. Second Edition. E-book. Cambridge: Cambridge University Press. ISBN 978-0-511-36800-4.
- Pashuto, Vladimir (1968). Внешняя политика Руси [The foreign policy of Russia] (in Russian). Moscow: Наука.
