= File Szeretvai =

Hungarian nobleman and military leader

Master of the stewards
- Reign: 1231–1232
- Predecessor: Demetrius Csák
- Successor: Maurice Pok
- Died: 17 August 1245; Jarosław, Principality of Halych
- Noble family: House of Szeretvai
- Spouse: daughter of Sudislav
- Issue: Stephen; Nicholas

File Szeretvai (Hungarian: Szeretvai Füle, Old Ruthenian: Филѧ; died 17 August 1245) was a Hungarian noble and military leader in the first half of the 13th century, who faithfully served kings Andrew II and then Béla IV. He participated in various royal campaigns against the Principality of Halych, which allowed him to rise to the ranks of the upper nobility. He functioned as Master of the stewards from 1231 to 1232.

== Service in Halych ==
The parentage of File (also Phyle, Füle, Fila or Filja) is unknown. His descendants later possessed landholdings mostly in the northeast part of Upper Hungary, including Szeretva (present-day Stretava, Slovakia), which he acquired during his career and later was named after this village. He may have been of relatively lesser noble origin, while Mór Wertner considered that he had belonged to the gens Miskolc. Ukrainian historian Myroslav Voloshchuk also shared this viewpoint based on a 1233 charter, but he misidentified his person with clergyman File Miskolc.

His political and social orientation connected entirely to the Hungarian aspirations in the Principality of Halych along the north-eastern border. After Andrew II installed his second son, the minor Coloman the ruler (prince, then king) of Halych (or Galicia) in 1214, File belonged to the entourage of the young monarch. It is possible File was present when Andrew II and Leszek the White, High Duke of Poland in Szepes (today Spiš, Slovakia) in the autumn of 1214, where they arranged the marriage between Coloman and Salomea, and their alliance against regent Vladislav Kormilchyc. Representing the Hungarian elite, along with Demetrius Aba and Benedict the Bald, File became one of the outstanding pillars of Coloman's reign in Halych in the subsequent years. To forge closer ties within the "Hungarian party" in Halych, File married an unidentified daughter of Sudislav, a leading Galician boyar who supported Coloman. File and his wife had two sons, Stephen and Nicholas. Stephen was the progenitor of the Szeretvai and Ramocsa de Szeretva noble families, a prominent kinship in Ung County until the beginning of the 16th century, but also possessed estates in Pozsony, Trencsén and Nyitra counties.

"... the ever-proud Filja [File] advanced [upon Halych], hoping to encircle the land and to empty the sea with his great host of Hungarians. He was wont to say that one stone could break many pots or to boast that one needed only a sharp sword and a swift steed [to kill] many Rus'ians. [...] Prince Oleksander [Alexander Vsevolodovich] betrayed Danilo [Danylo] and Vasilko [Romanovich] and they had no succour from anyone except God until [Prince] Mstislav [Mstislavich] arrived with the Polovcians [Cumans]. Then Filja retreated with his great host of Hungarians and Poles, taking with him the Galician boyars, his father-in law Sudislav, and [many] others. But some [of the boyars] fled [from him], for he had looked down upon them."
Galician–Volhynian Chronicle (c. 1219)

The relationship between Andrew II and Leszek the White had become tense after 1214. The Polish prince granted Volodymyr, which was the most prestigious princely seat in Volhynia, to Danylo and Vasilko Romanovich. He also failed to support Coloman during the siege of Halych. Leszek approached Mstislav Mstislavich, Prince of Novgorod, seeking his assistance against the Hungarians. Mstislav invaded Halych most probably in early 1219, according to historian Márta Font. File led the Hungarian army against the prince, but Mstislav routed his troops with the assistance of Cumans led by his father-in-law Köten. The defeat forced Coloman and his retinue, including File's father-in-law Sudislav, to flee to Hungary. The contemporary Galician–Volhynian Chronicle frequently calls File (Filja) as "gordy" – "proud", "haughty" or "overconfident" –, who constantly disparaged the Galician army. In Ukrainian historiography, he appears as a "cruel oppressor of Galicia".

"In the meantime, Filja was preparing for war. He was convinced that no one could oppose him on the field of battle. [...] The next day, on the eve of the feast of the Blessed Virgin, Mstislav marched early in the morning against the proud Filja and his Hungarians and Poles, and a great battle ensued which Mstislav won. Many of the Hungarians and Poles were killed as they fled [from the battlefield]. The haughty Filja was captured by the youth Dobrynin, whom the treacherous [boyar] Žiroslav had kidnapped [and Filja, thus, could flee]. [...] [At that time] Oleksander had betrayed [Danylo and Vasilko Romanovich] and concluded peace with Lestko [Leszek the White], Koloman [Coloman of Galicia], and the proud Filja."
Galician–Volhynian Chronicle (c. 1221)

By the summer of 1219, Leszek became hostile with Mstislav and the Romanovich brothers. Mstislav gave his daughter, Anna, in marriage to Danylo who soon occupied the lands between the rivers Wieprz and Bug from the Poles. Leszek reconciled with Andrew II; the two monarchs launched a military campaign jointly against Halych in October 1219. They defeated Mstislav in three battles, forcing him to withdraw and Coloman returned to the principality, while Danylo also surrendered the fortress of Halych. During the campaign, File led the Hungarian contingent, according to Márta Font, and remained in Halych in order to militarily support Coloman's labile rule in the principality, as there is no source for that King Andrew II sent subsequent Hungarian armies to Halych in the upcoming two years.

Mstislav hired Cumans and again invaded Halych in late 1220 or early 1221, but could not seize the capital. Mstislav's fiasco encouraged File to join Leszek's campaign against Volhynia, leaving Coloman and Salomea in the newly fortified Church of the Virgin Mary in Halych. Taking advantage of the absence of the bulk of the Hungarian army, Mstislav and the Cumans laid siege Halych in August 1221. File hurried back from his campaign, but Mstislav defeated his army and File was himself captured too on 14 August 1221. He could only flee with the help of a Galician boyar, Žiroslav. Coloman's retainers tried to resist in the fortified church, but the lack of water forced them to surrender. The Polish chronicler, Jan Długosz, wrote that Coloman and Salomea were imprisoned in the fortress of Torchesk. Andrew II and Mstislav negotiated and concluded a peace in late 1221 or early 1222. Mstislav released the Hungarian prisoners, while Coloman, who thus was able to return Hungary, had to relinquish his claim to the throne of Galicia–Volhynia.

== Social ascension ==
According to historian Attila Zsoldos, it is possible that File Szeretvai is identical with that File (Fila), who served as one of the vice-palatines (Latin: vicarius palatini) under Palatine Nicholas Szák in 1220. Zsoldos draw a social ascension for File, similarly to a fellow vice-palatine Maurice Pok. This File acted as judge in lawsuits in Transdanubian counties. Márta Font, who considered File permanently stayed in Halych between 1219 and 1221, questioned the identification.

"Rostislav [Mikhailovich]'s troops approaching and Filja standing with the rear-guard, bearing a standard, and [exhorting his men] to endure the attack [of the Rus'], for [he boasted] that although they were quick to do battle, they would not last long in the fighting. But God would not tolerate his boasting, and Danilo attacked him with [his stolnik] Jakov Marković and Selv. [At first encounter] Selv was wounded and Danilo [momentarily] captured, but he broke loose from [Filja] and rode forth [free] from within the [enemy] regiment. Catching sight of a Hungarian who was coming to help Filja, he struck him with his lance, plunging it [into his heart]. [...] Lev [Danylovych], who was still a child, broke his lance, [charging into] the proud Filja. [Then] Danilo swiftly swooped down upon Filja again, annihilated his regiment and tore his standard in half. When Rostislav saw this, he fled, and the Hungarians also turned to flight. [...] Many Hungarians and Poles were killed and captured from all [the enemy regiments]. And at that time the proud Filja was captured by the dvorskij Andrej [Danylo's right-hand man]. He was brought before Danilo and was killed by him."
Galician–Volhynian Chronicle (c. Summer 1245)

Despite his military failures in Halych, File did not fall out of the king's favor. He was granted the land Szeleste in Vas County by Andrew II around 1230. He also acquired the village Gyüd, which laid near Tasnád in Szolnok County (present-day Tășnad, Romania). He served as Master of the stewards in the royal court from 1231 to 1232. When Andrew II concluded an agreement with the Holy See in August–September 1233, File was among those barons of the realm, who swore on the document. He was referred to as ispán of Sopron County in 1234. Following his death, a royal charter styled him as "ban". It could be a honorific title, but also possible he held the dignity of Ban of Slavonia or – less likely – Ban of Severin sometime during his life. The Polish chronicler Jan Długosz incorrectly styled him as "palatine" (Latin: palatinus), and this error has been taken over by some historians thereafter.

After Béla IV ascended the Hungarian throne in 1235, File retained his influence in the royal court, unlike several other barons, but there are no sources for additional office positions. During their first invasion in 1241–1242, the Mongols, who advanced from Kievan Rus' broke through the barricades erected in the Verecke Pass (Veretsky Pass, Ukraine), devastated File's estates laid in Northeast Hungary along the border with the Kingdom of Galicia–Volhynia. File "lost all his property" during the invasion, but managed to survive. As a compensation, Béla IV donated him the lands Biccse and Hoznica in Trencsén County (present-day Bytča and Hvozdnica in Slovakia, respectively). Nevertheless, File concentrated his acquisitions primarily in Ung County. He bought Szeretva for 16 marks from local castle warriors sometime after 1241. It is plausible he acquired the surrounding settlements too – Pályin (Palín, Slovakia), Gejőc (Mali Hejivci, Ukraine) and Pinkóc (Pinkovce, Slovakia) –, which were later mentioned as properties of the Szeretvai family by the end of the 13th century.

Following the withdrawal of the Mongols in 1242, Béla IV was seeking to organize a new defensive system by creating client states to the south and east of Hungary. He had given his daughter Anna in marriage to Rostislav Mikhailovich, a claimant to the throne of Halych. Following Rostislav's unsuccessful attack in 1244, Béla supported his son-in-law to invade Halych, ruled by Danylo Romanovich, in the summer of 1245 (earlier historiography incorrectly marked 1249 as the year of the Hungarian campaign). The Hungarian monarch appointed File Szeretvai to lead a huge army consisted of Hungarians and Poles. File is the only known Hungarian military leader, who participated in campaigns against Halych during the reigns of both Andrew II and Béla IV, over a period of twenty-five years. His role may have been motivated by his existing family relationships in Galicia–Volhynia. Rostislav launched an attack against Jarosław north of Przemyśl; on 17 August 1245, Danylo, with Cuman assistance, annihilated the enemy, and Rostislav had to flee again to Hungary. File was killed during the skirmish, along with many Hungarians and Poles. According to the Galician–Volhynian Chronicle, File was captured and executed by Danylo himself. The Chronicle of the Romanids narrates that File was "captured by the enemies in our former army in Rus' and murdered by diverse tortures and miserably perished". His sons, Stephen and Nicholas were granted his formerly possessed domains in Trencsén County by Béla IV in December 1250.

== Sources ==
=== Primary sources ===
- The Hypatian Codex II: The Galician-Volynian Chronicle (An annotated translation by George A. Perfecky) (1973). Wilhelm Fink Verlag. LCCN 72-79463.

=== Secondary sources ===
- Engel, Pál (1998). A nemesi társadalom a középkori Ung megyében [The Noble Society in Medieval Ung County] (in Hungarian). Társadalom- és művelődéstörténeti tanulmányok 25., MTA Történettudományi Intézete. ISBN 963-8312-59-9.
- Font, Márta (2017). "A halicsi magyar uralmat támogató elit [The Elite Supporting Hungarian Rule in Galicia]". Világtörténet (in Hungarian). 39 (1): 33–52. ISSN 0083-6265.
- Font, Márta (2021). The Kings of the House of Árpád and the Rurikid Princes. Cooperation and conflict in medieval Hungary and Kievan Rus'. Arpadiana VIII., Research Centre for the Humanities. ISBN 978-963-416-278-0.
- Font, Márta; Barabás, Gábor (2019). Coloman, King of Galicia and Duke of Slavonia (1208–1241): Medieval Central Europe and Hungarian Power. Amsterdam University Press. ISBN 978-164-1890-24-3.
- Szőcs, Tibor (2014). A nádori intézmény korai története, 1000–1342 [An Early History of the Palatinal Institution: 1000–1342] (in Hungarian). Magyar Tudományos Akadémia Támogatott Kutatások Irodája. ISBN 978-963-508-697-9.
- Voloshchuk, Myroslav (2021). Ruthenians (the Rus') in the Kingdom of Hungary (11th to mid-14th Century): Settlement, Property, and Socio-Political Role. Leiden: Brill. ISBN 9789004469709. Archived from the original on 14 April 2023.
- Zsoldos, Attila (2011). Magyarország világi archontológiája, 1000–1301 [Secular Archontology of Hungary, 1000–1301] (in Hungarian). História, MTA Történettudományi Intézete. ISBN 978-963-9627-38-3.

File (Füle) House of Szeretvai Born: ? Died: 17 August 1245
Political offices
Preceded by Demetrius Csák	Master of the stewards 1231–1232	Succeeded by Maurice Pok
