= Battle of Zvenigorod (1211) =

Battle in Galicia-Volhynia

- Part of War of the Galician Succession (1205–1245)
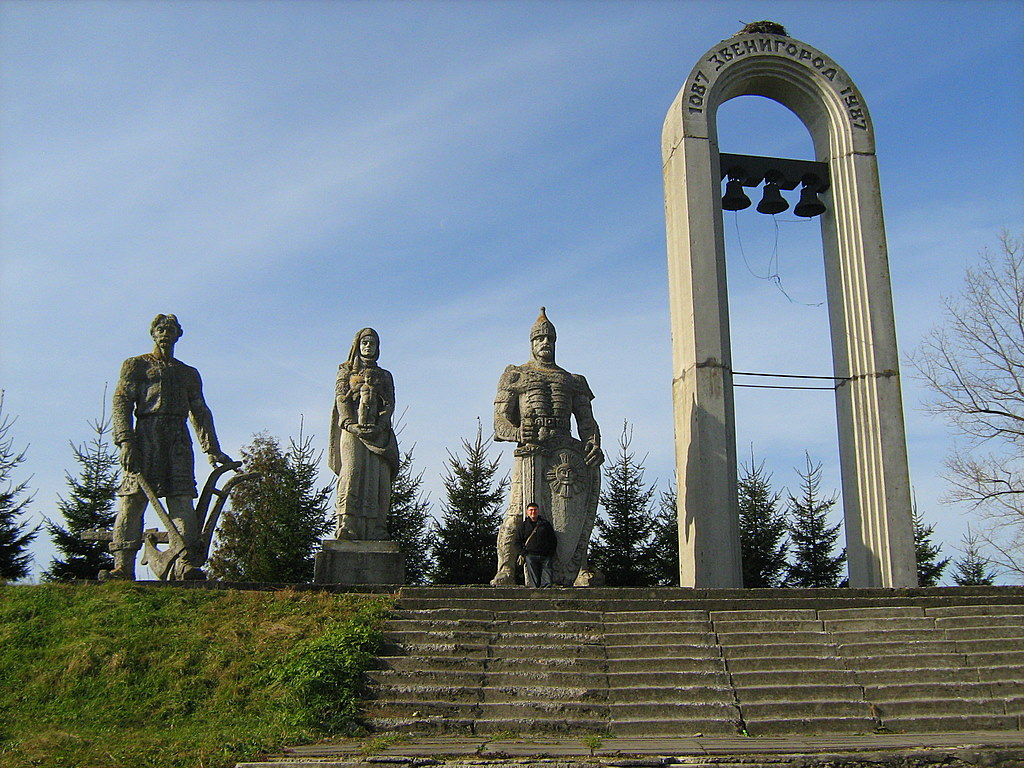
- Monument to the 1000th anniversary of Zvenigorod (Lviv region).
Date	Summer 1211
Location	Zvenigorod, Principality of Galicia-Volhynia
Result	Polish–Hungarian victory
Territorial changes	Installation of Daniel on the Halychian throne

Belligerents
Duchy of Kraków; Duchy of Sandomierz; Kingdom of Hungary	Principality of Galicia

Commanders and leaders
Leszek the White; Andrew II of Hungary; Vladislav Kormilchyc; Sudyslav	Vladimir III Igorevich; Izyaslav Vladimirovich

Casualties and losses
Light	Heavy

Battle of Zvenigorod (1211) was an armed clash fought in 1211 between Hungarian-Volhynian-Małopolska forces and Ruthenian forces supported by the Polovtsians, as part of the struggle for the throne of the principality of Galicia-Volhynia.

After the death of Prince Roman the Great in 1205, the Igorevichi took over the principality, but their rule was met with resistance from the boyars. In 1211, supporters of Daniel Romanovich, the rightful heir to the throne, turned to King Andrew II of Hungary for help. The military expedition was led by the Palatine Pat Győr, who set out for Ruthenia with numerous Hungarian troops and allied Galician and Volhynian forces.

After the capture of Przemyśl, the Hungarian army besieged Zvenigorod, where Vladimir Igorevich was defending himself. Reinforcements from the Rus' rulers and the Polovtsians, brought by Izyaslav Vladimirovich, came to the relief. The clash ended in the defeat of the defenders – Roman Igorevich was captured at Shumsk, and Zvenigorod fell into the hands of the coalition. After the victory, the intervention troops captured Halych, from which Vladimir Igorevich escaped. Daniel Romanovich was put back on the throne at the Uspensky Council, with the support of the Hungarians and boyar opposition.

== Bibliography ==
- Foryt, Artur (2021). Zawichost 1205 (in Polish). Warszawa: Wydawnictwo Bellona. ISBN 978-83-11-16068-2.
- Dąbrowski, Dariusz (2013). Daniel Romanowicz. Król Rusi (ok. 1201–1264). Biografia polityczna. Avalon. ISBN 978-83-7730-069-5.
