= Galician campaign (1213–1214) =

- Part of War of the Galician Succession (1205–1245)
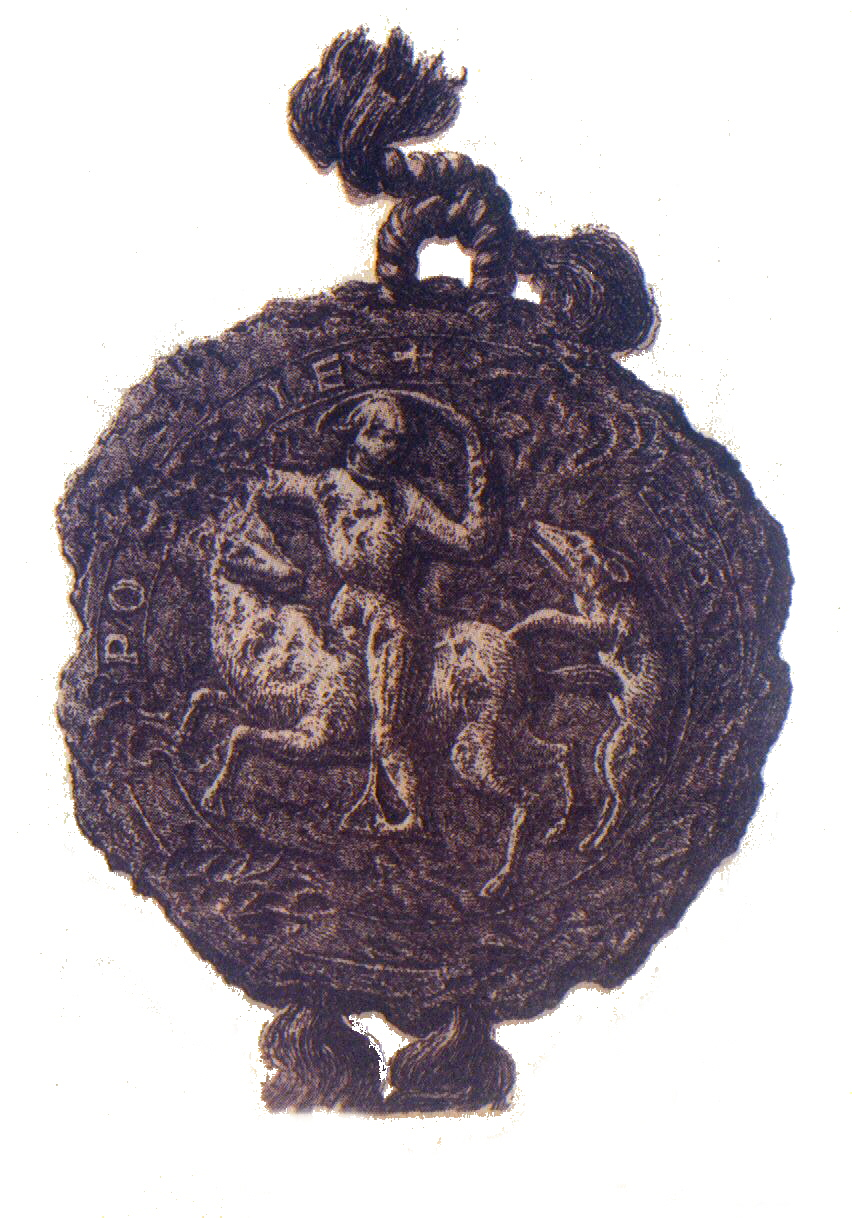
- Seal of Leszek the White
Date	1213–1214
Location	Duchy of Galicia-Volhynia
Result	Leszek's victory

Belligerents
Duchy of Galicia-Volhynia; Kingdom of Hungary	Duchy of Kraków

Commanders and leaders
Vladislaw Kormiliczyc	Leszek the White

Casualties and losses
Heavy	Light

The expedition of Leszek the White to Halych (1213–1214) or Galician campaign (1213–1214) was an expedition by the Duke of Kraków that ended in victory over the Ruthenian forces, although it did not lead to the capture of the city but only to the ransacking of the Duchy of Galicia-Volhynia.

== Campaign ==
In 1213, Prince Leszek the White undertook an expedition to Halych. The reason for the expedition may have been Prince Daniel of Galicia's claim to the throne of the principality of Galicia-Volhynia. Leszek's forces were joined by, among others, Prince Alexander of Vladimir and Vsevolod of Belz. In response, the boyar Vladislav assembled his army, which confronted Leszek's troops at the Bóbrka River. In the battle, Vladislav's forces were completely crushed by the Poles. Despite this victory, Leszek did not manage to capture Halych, but in retaliation he carried out a plundering expedition, plundering the Principality of Galicia-Volhynia.

== Bibliography ==
- Foryt, Artur (2021). Zawichost 1205 (in Polish). Warszawa: Wydawnictwo Bellona. ISBN 978-83-11-16068-2.
