= Palín, Michalovce District =

Village and municipality in Slovakia

Palín Pályin
- Municipality
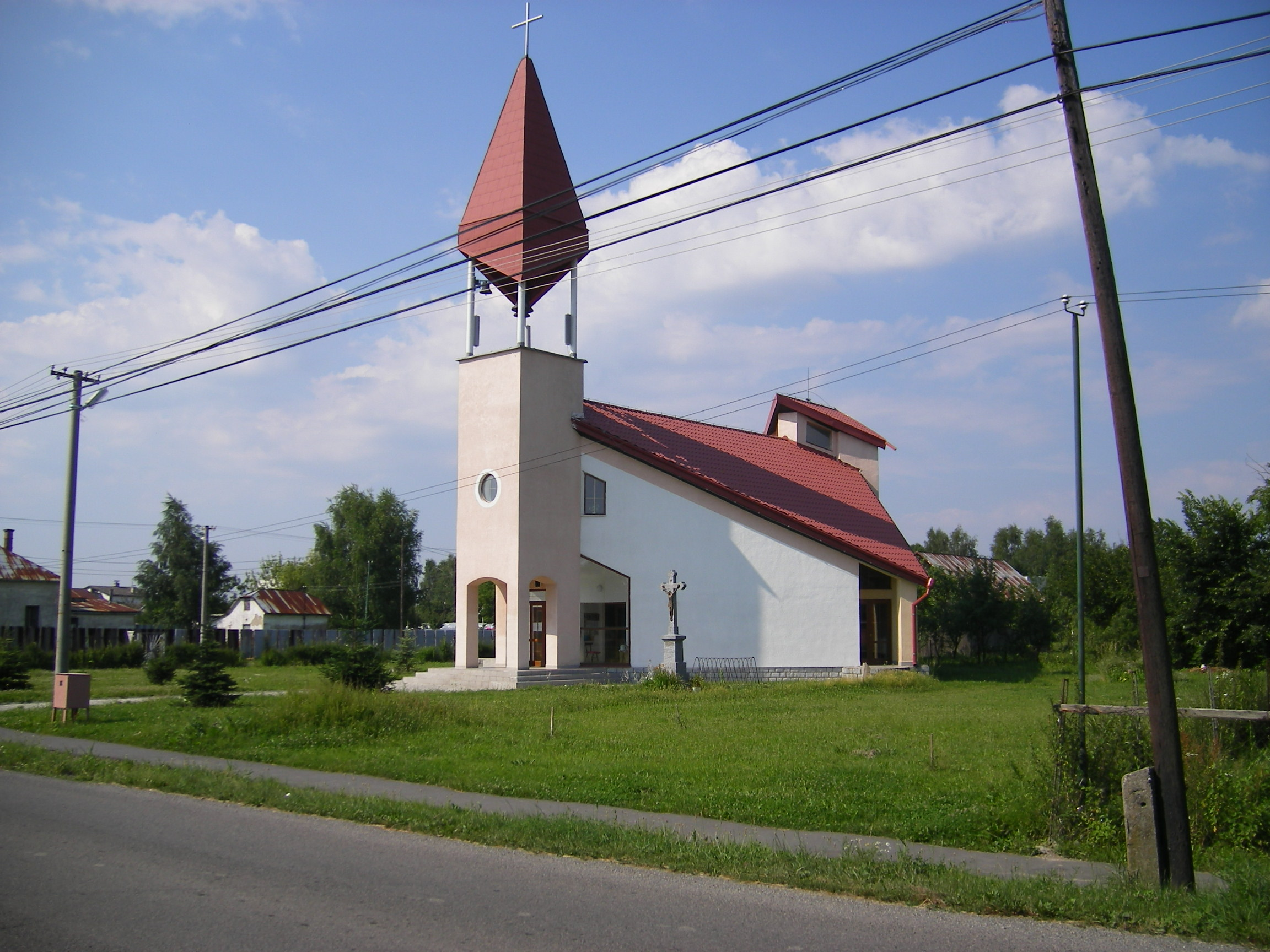
- Church of the Ascension of Christ

- Flag

- Location of Palín in the Košice Region Location of Palín in Slovakia
- Coordinates: 48.67°N 21.98°E
- Country: Slovakia
- Region: Košice Region
- District: Michalovce District
- First mentioned: 1302

Area
  - Total: 11.22 km^{2} (4.33 sq mi)
- Elevation: 104 m (341 ft)

Population (2025)
  - Total: 867
- Time zone: UTC+1 (CET)
  - Summer (DST): UTC+2 (CEST)
- Postal code: 721 3
- Area code: +421 56
- Vehicle registration plate (until 2022): MI
- Website: www.obecpalin.eu

Palín (Hungarian: Pályin) is a village and municipality in Michalovce District in the Kosice Region of eastern Slovakia. It is located 15 kilometres from the city of Michalovce.

== History ==
In historical records the village was first mentioned in 1302.

== Geography ==
The municipality lies at an altitude of 104 metres (341 ft) and covers an area of 11.22 km^{2} (4.33 sq mi) (2025).

== Population ==
Population statistic (10 years)
Year	1995	2005	2015	2025
Count	827	871	903	867
Difference		+5.32%	+3.67%	−3.98%

Population statistic
Year	2024	2025
Count	872	867
Difference		−0.57%

It has a population of 867 people (31 December 2025).

=== Ethnicity ===
Census 2021 (1+ %)
Ethnicity	Number	Fraction
Slovak	809	93.52%
Not found out	36	4.16%
Total	865	

In year 2021 was 865 people by ethnicity 809 as Slovak, 36 as Not found out, 8 as Czech, 8 as Other, 7 as Romani, 5 as Hungarian, 4 as Ukrainian, 2 as Rusyn, 1 as Russian and 1 as English.

Note on population: The difference values of population numbers in the table "Population statistic" and in the sections "Ethnicity" & "Religion" is caused by the use of various statistical methods.

=== Religion ===
Census 2021 (1+ %)
Religion	Number	Fraction
Roman Catholic Church	306	35.38%
Calvinist Church	204	23.58%
None	114	13.18%
Greek Catholic Church	92	10.64%
Not found out	51	5.9%
Jehovah's Witnesses	40	4.62%
Eastern Orthodox Church	22	2.54%
Evangelical Church	22	2.54%
Total	865	

In year 2021 was 865 people by religion 306 from Roman Catholic Church, 204 from Calvinist Church, 114 from None, 92 from Greek Catholic Church, 51 from Not found out, 40 from Jehovah's Witnesses, 22 from Eastern Orthodox Church, 22 from Evangelical Church, 4 from Christian Congregations in Slovakia, 4 from Islam, 2 from Old Catholic Church, 1 from Other and not ascertained christian church, 1 from United Methodist Church, 1 from Church of the Brethren and 1 from Ad hoc movements.

== Culture ==
The village has a small public library, a gymnasium and a football pitch.
