= Stretava =

Village and municipality in Slovakia

Stretava Nagyszeretva
- Municipality
- Flag

- Location of Stretava in the Košice Region Location of Stretava in Slovakia
- Coordinates: 48.63°N 22.00°E
- Country: Slovakia
- Region: Košice Region
- District: Michalovce District
- First mentioned: 1266

Area
  - Total: 7.09 km^{2} (2.74 sq mi)
- Elevation: 102 m (335 ft)

Population (2025)
  - Total: 687
- Time zone: UTC+1 (CET)
  - Summer (DST): UTC+2 (CEST)
- Postal code: 721 3
- Area code: +421 56
- Vehicle registration plate (until 2022): MI
- Website: www.stretava.sk

Stretava (Hungarian: Nagyszeretva) is a village and municipality in Michalovce District in the Kosice Region of eastern Slovakia.

== History ==
In historical records the village was first mentioned in 1266.

== Geography ==
The municipality lies at an altitude of 102 metres (335 ft) and covers an area of 7.09 km^{2} (2.74 sq mi) (2025).

== Population ==
Population statistic (10 years)
Year	1995	2005	2015	2025
Count	544	642	683	687
Difference		+18.01%	+6.38%	+0.58%

Population statistic
Year	2024	2025
Count	679	687
Difference		+1.17%

It has a population of 687 people (31 December 2025).

=== Ethnicity ===
Census 2021 (1+ %)
Ethnicity	Number	Fraction
Slovak	647	92.56%
Romani	44	6.29%
Not found out	37	5.29%
Total	699	

In year 2021 was 699 people by ethnicity 647 as Slovak, 44 as Romani, 37 as Not found out, 3 as Czech, 3 as Hungarian, 2 as Other and 1 as Ukrainian.

Note on population: The difference values of population numbers in the table "Population statistic" and in the sections "Ethnicity" & "Religion" is caused by the use of various statistical methods.

=== Religion ===
Census 2021 (1+ %)
Religion	Number	Fraction
Roman Catholic Church	187	26.75%
None	174	24.89%
Calvinist Church	127	18.17%
Jehovah's Witnesses	104	14.88%
Greek Catholic Church	53	7.58%
Not found out	32	4.58%
Christian Congregations in Slovakia	8	1.14%
Evangelical Church	7	1%
Total	699	

In year 2021 was 699 people by religion 187 from Roman Catholic Church, 174 from None, 127 from Calvinist Church, 104 from Jehovah's Witnesses, 53 from Greek Catholic Church, 32 from Not found out, 8 from Christian Congregations in Slovakia, 7 from Evangelical Church, 2 from Other, 2 from Church of the Brethren, 1 from Eastern Orthodox Church, 1 from United Methodist Church and 1 from Buddhism.

== See also ==
- List of municipalities and towns in Michalovce District
- List of municipalities and towns in Slovakia
