= Anna-Euphrosyne =

- Princess of Galicia and Volhynia
- Tenure: 1199–1205
- Died: 1253+ or 1288+
- Burial: Volodymyr
- Spouse: Roman the Great
- Issue: Daniel of Galicia; Vasylko Romanovich
- House: Angelos
- Father: Isaac II Angelos
- Mother: (Likely) Irene Tornikina

Anna-Euphrosyne Angelina or Anna-Helena Angelina (?–1253), was a Princess of Galicia and Volhynia by marriage to Roman the Great, in 1199–1205. She was regent of the Principality during the minority of her son Daniel of Galicia from 1205 to 1214.

== Life ==
=== Early life ===
She was the daughter of Byzantine Emperor Isaac II Angelos and his first wife Irene, likely a Tornikina.

In the Galician–Volhynian Chronicle she is known simply as the Princess of Roman. According to Aleksandr Mayorov, the first half of the chronicle (Daniel of Galicia chronicle) is similar to Byzantine rather than Ruthenian historiography not out of coincidence. In his lection Mayorov tries to prove that not only the chronicle, but the prince himself has Byzantine origin, highly unlikely since he waged wars against the cumans (Cumanen/ Comnen), holding temporary seat in the Byzantium at the time. According to another Russian historian, Vasiliy Pashuto, Anna might have been a daughter of some wealthy Volhynian boyar.

=== Princess ===
She married the Prince of Galicia and Volhynia, Roman the Great.

The name of Roman's wife is under discussion. The name was assumed to be Anna based on the fact that her grandchild Mstislav Danilovich established the Church of Saint Joachim and Anna in Volodymyr. According to the Supraśl Orthodox Monastery and Kiev Caves Monastery obituaries, her second name was Helena. It is possible that she was a daughter of Margaret of Hungary (House of Árpád) rather than Irene Palaiologina.

It is known that Roman the Great was killed at the Battle of Zawichost in 1205, possibly rushing to help Philip of Swabia, who was married to Anna's sister Irene Angelina. The existence of relations between Philip and Roman could be traced with the fact that Roman was recorded to be among the founders of the 12th century Peterskirche of Benedictine monastery in Erfurt when he gave as a charity 20 grzywna of silver.

=== Regency ===
After the death of her spouse in 1205, she became regent for her son during his minority. She successfully made treaties with Poland, Hungary and Lithuania and benefited commerce, but was opposed by the nobility. She was deposed in a coup by the boyars and escaped to Poland.

By the help of an army provided by king Andrew of Hungary, she retook the power of regency. She arrested the boyars who had opposed her and confiscated their property. During her regency, she annexed Tikholm, Peremyshl and Volodymyr.

In 1214, she retired from regency and turned power over to her sons.

=== Later life ===
In 1219 she became a nun after her older son Daniel of Galicia married the daughter of Mstislav the Bold. According to Leonid Makhnovets the widow of Roman the Great was at the burial of her grandchild Volodymyr Vasylkovich in 1288 in Liuboml, so it is possible that she died soon thereafter.
