= Battle of the Vistula River (1341) =

Battle between Poland and Ruthenia

Battle of Vistula River (1341)
- Part of Galicia–Volhynia Wars
Location	Vistula
Result	Polish victory
Territorial changes	Retreat of the Ruthenian-Tatar forces

Belligerents
Kingdom of Poland	Kingdom of Galicia–Volhynia

Commanders and leaders
Casimir the Great	Dmytro Dedko

Casualties and losses
Unknown	Heavy

Battle of the Vistula River - a battle fought in January 1341 between the Polish army and an army of rebellious Ruthenian boyars supported by Tatar reinforcements.

On 7 April 1340, the Prince of Galicia-Volhynia, Yuri II Boleslav, died, poisoned by boyars. After his heirless death, he bequeathed his duchy to Casimir the Great. The Polish king acted swiftly and already nine days after Yuri's death launched an expedition into Ruthenia. However, the fight for the Kingdom of Galicia-Volhynia was also joined by the Tartars, with whom some of the Ruthenian boyars opposed to the incorporation of the Ruthenian lands into the crown. Casimir made two armed forays into Ruthenia in 1340. His second foray was met with strong resistance. The Ruthenian boyars called on the Tartars for help. The Tartar cavalry, together with Russian reinforcements led by the leader of the boyar opposition, Dmytro Dedko, invaded the Polish lands. The clash with the Polish king occurred in January 1341 at the Vistula River. The Polish knights did not allow the invaders to cross the river line and during the fighting, according to an account by Jan of Czarnków, the Sandomierz voivode Mikołaj Czelej died pierced by a Tatar arrow. After the setbacks, the Tatar-Ruthenian forces retreated towards Lublin.
