= Battle of Zawichost =

Battle in Poland in 1205

Coordinates: 50°48′22″N 21°51′32″E

Date	19 June 1205
Location	Zawichost, Vistula River, Seniorate Province, Duchy of Sandomierz
Result	Polish victory

Belligerents
Duchy of Sandomierz; Duchy of Masovia	Principality of Galicia–Volhynia

Commanders and leaders
Krystyn (voivode); Leszek I the White; Konrad I of Masovia	Roman the Great †

Strength
2,000–2,500	5,000–7,500 (Note: According to Polish historian Artur Foryt, who wrote a work on the battle, the 13,000-strong Ruthenian army is incorrect, claiming that this is due to a misreading of the local chronicle by most Polish historians. He believes that the Ruthenian forces could have numbered between 5,000 and 7,500 men. (see Ruthenian forces))

Casualties and losses
Light	Almost all killed (Note: The crossing detachment was decimated, it was not the whole army, but in the pursuit of the remaining army many were killed. Also not many survived this Carnage)

The Battle of Zawichost, also called Zawichost campaign, fought on 19 June 1205, was a key clash between the troops of Duke Roman the Great of Galicia-Volhynia and the Polish forces led by Leszek the White, Duke of Sandomierz, and his brother Konrad I of Masovia. After Roman invaded Lesser Poland, his army was surprised and defeated by the Poles near Zawichost on the Vistula River. Roman was killed as a result of the battle, which led to the strengthening of Leszek's and Conrad's positions and triggered a war of succession in the Principality of Galicia-Volhynia. The battle is considered one of the greatest victories of medieval Poland.

Prior to the battle, in the 11th century, there had been border disputes between the Polish principalities and the Ruthenian principalities, and the territories of Lesser Poland and Galician-Volhynian Rus had changed affiliation several times. The early Middle Ages were characterised by a sparse population of these areas, which were settled by both Rus peoples from the east and Poles from the west. In 1199, Leszek the White supported Roman the Great militarily, helping him to take the throne in Volodymyr. (Note: Poland fought many wars with Kievan Rus', among others over the Cherven cities (see List of wars between Piast Poland and Kievan Rus' and List of wars and battles involving Galicia–Volhynia)) However, in 1205 Roman invaded Lesser Poland, leading to a confrontation with Polish forces. After the victory at Zawichost, Leszek the White's reputation grew considerably, enabling him to take power in Kraków. His brother, Conrad, having come of age, demanded a share in power, which led to the division of the country between them.

== Background ==
The motives behind Roman Mstislavovich's campaign remain unclear to this day and are the subject of much debate among historians. Historical sources do not provide a clear cause, which has led to many different hypotheses based on the analysis of available chronicles and political events from the turn of the 12th and 13th centuries.

=== Hypotheses ===
One of the more popular interpretations is the so-called Saxon hypothesis, based on the Chronicle of the Cistercian monk Alberic of Trois-Fontaines. According to this source, Roman's campaign was linked to internal power struggles in Germany. It is assumed that the expedition may have been part of a wider political game in which Roman was involved by rival parties in the Empire. Although this hypothesis is supported by some Eastern European sources, there is no direct evidence of Roman's active involvement in German conflicts. A second interpretation is the so-called Greater Poland hypothesis, which indicates that Roman's actions were the result of internal conflicts between the Polish Piasts. Particular attention is paid to the tensions between Władysław Laskonogi and Leszek the White, which may have prompted Roman to intervene. The Galician–Volhynian Chronicle (c. 1290) indicates that Leszek the White was in conflict with Władysław Laskonogi, and that Roman was supposed to act in favour of one of these rulers. This interpretation has gained popularity in Polish historiography, but later analyses point to its doubts. Historian Artur Foryt suggests that although Roman may have acted in the context of Polish conflicts, it is likely that his actions were motivated by personal goals rather.

According to Ruthenian Hypothesis, the cause of the conflict may have been Roman Mstislavovich's refusal to recognise the supremacy of Leszek the White. This attitude may have provoked the Prince of Galicia-Volhynia to start hostilities. It is possible that earlier Leszek concluded an agreement with Roman, under which Roman pledged certain obligations to the Polish ruler. These obligations may have formed the basis of Leszek's claims against Roman. The Wielkopolska Chronicle, on the other hand, indicates that the main point of contention was Roman's refusal to pay tribute to Leszek. The conflict over tribute was crucial in escalating tensions between the two sides and may have been the direct cause of the outbreak of war.

=== Hypothesis according to Jan Długosz ===
According to Jan Długosz, there are several reasons attributed to Roman Mstislavovich's actions. Among them are the enormous wealth gained in Rus at a time when almost the entire country was under his control, the dispersion and dissolution of his forces - both cavalry and infantry - among the numerous Polish principalities, and conflicts between Polish magnates. Another factor was the young age and inexperience of Leszek the White and Konrad I of Masovia, which may have weakened their ability to manage the situation effectively. Roman's actions may also have been motivated by the failure of negotiations with Leszek and Konrad. According to accounts, the Prince of Galicia-Volhynia demanded the handover of the land of Lublin and compensation for the losses suffered during the Battle of the Mozgawa. However, the response of the Polish rulers was decidedly negative - they refused to meet these demands, arguing that Roman, by leaving the battlefield, forfeited his right to any claims.

Długosz further explains that before crossing the Polish frontier, Roman sent emissaries to the Bishop of Volodimer' and asked for his blessing, as he intended to campaign in Poland for three years. The Bishop declined Roman's gifts and denied him any blessing, explaining that "he cannot bless Roman or his enterprise, since he has previously started unjust and wicked wars and is again embarking on one that is quite unjustified, considering that the Poles have so often exposed their bodies to danger and death to defend the Ruthenians against the barbarians." Roman responded by telling the bishop that he will cut his head off when he returns from his victory.

== Strengths of the parties ==
=== Ruthenian forces ===
To this day, it is not precisely established how numerous a force Roman the Great amassed during his expedition against the Poles. However, in the light of the available historical sources and analyses, several conclusions can be drawn on this subject. The nature of the expedition, which aimed to intervene militarily in Polish lands, indicates that Roman led a relatively large army, capable of carrying out an offensive deep into the enemy's territory. The Rocznik Krakowski, one of the key sources describing the events of the period, states that the size of the Ruthenian army was around 13,000 men. This figure was for some time accepted by historians as reliable. On the basis of this figure, attempts were made to estimate the mobilisation capacity of the Galician-Volyhnian principality during Roman rule. Modern historical research, however, casts doubt on this figure. Historian Arthur Foryt and Mariusz Samp points out that these figures may be exaggerated and suggests that the size of Roman's army was between 5,000 and 7,500 men. According to Foryt, the size of this force was more in line with the logistical capacity of the principality and the nature of the conflict.

An equally important factor to take into account is the power of the Duchy of Galician-Volhynian in the time of Roman Mstislavovich. This principality was one of the richest and best developed politically and militarily regions of Rus. (Note: See Reign of Roman the Great (1199–1205)) Roman, as the ruler of this territory, had the resources to maintain a large and well-equipped army, which gave him a significant advantage in clashes with neighbouring states. However, the exact date of the completion of the mobilisation of the army before the expedition against the Poles is not known. The process may have depended on a number of factors, such as the political situation in the region, the availability of resources, and the time it took to gather troops from different parts of the principality. Discussions on the size of Roman forces and the date of mobilisation remain open in historiography. Differences in estimates are due to the lack of clear evidence in the sources and discrepancies in their interpretation by researchers.

=== Polish forces ===
Meanwhile, the Polish forces were much less numerous compared to the army of Roman the Great. The mobilisation capacity of the Duchy of Mazovia and the Duchy of Sandomierz was limited due to the small human and economic resources of both regions. It is estimated that the army organised by Leszek the White and Konrad I of Masovia numbered between 2,000 and 2,500 soldiers. Command of the Polish forces was entrusted to the Mazovian Voivode Krystyn, who played a key role in organising the defence and in directing the troops in the decisive battle. Despite the crushing numerical superiority of the Ruthenian army, the outcome of the campaign was not determined solely by the strength of the army. Knowledge of the terrain, effective tactics and probable errors in command on the Roman side played a significant role in the Polish victory.

== Before battle ==
=== The siege of Łuków and Lublin and the activities of Ruthenian army ===
The course of Roman Mstislavovich's campaign against the Polish lands remains unclear and difficult to fully reconstruct, mainly due to contradictions in historical sources. Jan Długosz gives a detailed description of the actions in his chronicles, but much important information has been omitted or is not confirmed in other accounts. According to Długosz, Roman held negotiations with two Polish bishops, indicating attempts to resolve the conflict diplomatically, but these talks were unsuccessful. The chronicler also mentions the siege of Lublin by the Ruthenians, but the city was ultimately not captured. Długosz's concise description of the siege remains unconfirmed in other sources. The reasons for the campaign are also controversial. There are two main hypotheses. The first assumes that Roman's actions were a response to provocation by the Poles. The second suggests that Roman acted on his own initiative, driven by an ambition to subjugate Polish lands, in particular the Duchy of Sandomierz.

Historian Artur Foryt provides a detailed breakdown of Roman's campaign into several key stages. The first of these was the strike against the Polish lands, concentrated towards Drohiczyn. This was followed by clashes with a small Polish force of only a few hundred warriors, fielded by Leszek the White and Konrad I of Masovia. The next stage was the siege of several Polish strongholds - according to Foryt, most probably Łuków and Lublin, both of which were to be captured by the Ruthenians. The Polish troops were forced to retreat beyond the Vistula, and the Ruthenian army followed their lead, reaching the Zawichost area in the second half of June.

=== Prelude ===
However, the exact location of Roman's crossing of the Vistula is not known. Some sources suggest that it may have taken place south of Zawichost, which raises discrepancies in determining the location of the key battle. The initial phase of the campaign brought success to the army of the Ruthenian prince. Roman managed to capture several strongholds and forced the Polish forces to withdraw. On 18 June, the Ruthenian army established a camp, which marked an important point in the further course of the campaign. Despite the initial successes, the final fate of the expedition depended on further developments, which required Roman to face logistical difficulties and possible resistance from the Poles.

== Polish chronicle account ==
=== Phase I: Vistula crossing and preparations ===
On 19 June 1205, Roman Mstislavovich began the crossing of his troops across the Vistula. The exact number of soldiers involved in the crossing remains unknown, but it took place without resistance from the Polish forces. Roman, relying on information provided by his agents, believed that the Polish troops were far from the crossing point. This overconfidence in intelligence proved to be a strategic error. The decision to cross at this point, according to historian Artur Foryt, was due to the difficult terrain conditions in other areas. At the same time, a combined Masovian-Sandomierian force led by Conrad I of Masovia and Leszek the White reached Zawichost. According to Jan Długosz, the Polish forces were to be commanded by the Mazovian Voivode Krystyn. By this time Roman was constantly underestimating the Polish forces.

=== Phase II: Sudden attack by Polish forces ===
After the Ruthenian army had crossed the Vistula, the Polish command decided on a night march of the Mazovian-Sandomierian forces towards Zawichost. The aim was to prevent the enemy from forcing the river further and to surprise them when they crossed. There is a possibility that the Polish scouts recognised Prince Roman by his distinctive armour and princely markings, which may have influenced the decision to attack quickly. The Polish troops carefully prepared their positions - the archers occupied the dominant hill from where they could fire, and the cavalry hid behind a bend in the Vistula, waiting for the moment to charge. The plan was to break through the Halician (Ruthenian) forces crowded in the trough near Zawichost using surprise, momentum and archer support.

At the agreed signal, the Polish knights moved in a compact column, accelerating as they approached the enemy's position. The unexpected attack hit Roman's troops with full force, who, surprised and crowded, were unable to organise an effective defence. As a result of the charge by the Polish forces, the Ruthenians suffered heavy losses and their array was completely broken.

=== Phase III: Defeat of the Ruthenian army and death of Roman ===
Roman, realising that his troops had fallen into a trap, tried to quickly organise a defence. However, the congestion of troops and lack of manoeuvring space prevented an effective response. The Ruthenians, pinned down by the river, tried to retreat to the right bank of the Vistula, which ended in disaster. During the retreat, the Polish forces began a pursuit during which the number of dead was enormous. Many Polish chronicles emphasise the scale of losses suffered by the Ruthenian army, which almost completely ceased to exist. According Długosz many of the Rus' drowned and many more died at the hands of the local population, as Polish troops chased them all the way to Volodimer'. Few survived the massacre and at the order of Leszek and Konrad, Roman's body was buried in Sandomierz. The two factions came to an agreement and the Ruthenians released all their prisoners and paid 1,000 silver marks to recover the body of Roman, which was then buried in Volodimer. Długosz also told of an incredible massacre he supposedly stated that the Vistula River near Zawichost had the colour of blood for a moment.

== Ruthenian Chronicle Account ==
The ‘‘Galician–Volhynian Chronicle’’, which begins in 1205 shortly after Roman’s death, records the event briefly:

At that time, Prince Roman died at the hands of the Poles by the Vistula. And a great grief came upon the land of Rus’. They [the people] mourned him with bitter weeping, for he was a mighty prince, and wise in war and governance.

The chronicle provides no battle description, no mention of troop strength, or specific tactics. The event is framed as a tragic martyrdom, with Roman depicted as a Christian prince who died at the height of his power. He is referred to as a “tsar,” a title suggesting imperial stature.

== Analysis by Ruthenian and Ukrainian Historians ==
=== Mykhailo Hrushevsky (Ukrainian historian) ===
In History of Ukraine-Rus, Hrushevsky describes Roman’s death as an ambush or skirmish, rather than a pitched battle. He notes that Ruthenian sources offer no clear detail and argues:

"The chronicler, overwhelmed by grief, offers no account of the confrontation itself. The silence may reflect either a sudden encounter or an embarrassment at the lack of preparation."
— History of Ukraine-Rus’, Vol. 3

Hrushevsky emphasizes that Roman’s death was a turning point in Ukrainian history, marking the temporary collapse of centralized power in Galicia–Volhynia.

=== Vladimir Pashuto (Belarusian-Soviet historian) ===
Pashuto interprets Roman’s 1205 campaign as an attempt to assert dominance over Polish borderlands. He writes:

"Roman died not in a battle of glory, but in an unexpected clash with the combined Polish princes. The Ruthenian chronicle, deeply ideological, chose lament over clarity."

He suggests the confrontation may have been politically motivated retribution, as Roman had previously interfered in Polish succession disputes.

== Aftermath ==
Following Roman’s death, the principality of Halych–Volhynia descended into internal conflict. The ‘‘Galician–Volhynian Chronicle’’ shifts its focus to the struggles of his widow and sons, and the intervention of foreign powers in Galician affairs.

The battle itself disappears from the narrative after Roman’s death is noted, underscoring the moral and dynastic focus of Ruthenian chronicles over detailed military reporting.

== Historiographical Note ==
Modern Polish sources often describe the event as a battle won by Leszek the White, portraying it as a Polish victory. However, no Ruthenian source confirms this framing, and Ukrainian and Belarusian historians argue that the event was likely a small-scale ambush or raid, not a decisive military engagement.

However, the exact circumstances of Roman Mstislavovich's death remain unknown. According to the Suzdalian Chronicle, Roman was killed in battle, which is also supported by contemporary historians such as Artur Foryt and Perfecky. (Note: Original text: "Тогож̑ лѣт̑ . ходиша кнѧзи Рѧзаньскъıӕ В на Половци и взѧша вежѣ ихъ ❙ Тогож̑ . лѣт̑ . Иде Романъ Галичьскъıи на Лѧхъı и взѧ . в҃ . города Лѧдьскаӕ . и ставшю же ѥму над Вислою рѣкою . и ѿѣха сам̑ в малѣ дружинѣ ѿ полку своѥго . Лѧхове же наѣхавше оубиша и . и дружину ѡколо ѥго избиша . приѣхавше же Галичане взѧша кнѧзѧ своѥго мр҃тва . и несоша и в Галичь . и положиша и въ цр҃кви ст҃ъıӕ Бц҃а". )) The Galician-Volyn Chronicle, on the other hand, does not specify how his death occurred, limiting itself to only mentioning the prince's demise. Roman's death determined the defeat of the Ruthenian army and ended the Battle of Zawichost, leaving a lasting mark on the politics of the region.

== See also ==
- War of the Galician Succession (1205–1245)

== Bibliography ==
=== Primary sources ===
- Galician–Volhynian Chronicle (1290s)
  - (in Ukrainian) Galician-Volhynian Chronicle (years 1224–1244), based on the Hypatian Codex. (interpreted by Leonid Makhnovets)
  - Perfecky, George A. (1973). The Hypatian Codex Part Two: The Galician–Volynian Chronicle. An annotated translation by George A. Perfecky. Munich: Wilhelm Fink Verlag. OCLC 902306.
- Długosz, Jan (1997) [1480]. The Annals of Jan Długosz. Translated by Michael, Maurice. Chichester: I M Publications. ISBN 1-901019-00-4. original title: Annales seu cronicae incliti Regni Poloniae (Annals or Chronicles of the Famous Kingdom of Poland).

=== Secondary sources ===
- Foryt, Artur (2021). Zawichost 1205 (in Polish). Warszawa: Wydawnictwo Bellona. ISBN 978-83-11-16068-2.
- Hrushevsky, Mykhailo (1999). History of Ukraine-Rus’, Volume 3: The Galicia-Volhynia Principality. Translated by Marta Skorupsky. Canadian Institute of Ukrainian Studies Press.
- Samp, Mariusz (2024). Bitwa pod Zawichostem (1205): krwawa łaźnia nad Wisłą [The Battle of Zawichost (1205): a bloodbath on the Vistula River] (in Polish).
