= Vasylko Romanovych =

Rus prince (1203–1269)

Vasylko Romanovych (Old East Slavic: Василко Романович; 1199 or 1203–1269 or 1271) was Prince of Belz (1207–1269), Prince of Berestia (1231–1269), and Prince of Volhynia (1231–1269). He was the son of Roman the Great and Anna-Euphrosyne, and the younger brother of Daniel of Galicia (Danylo).

== Biography ==
After his father's death in 1205, the Galician boyars drove Vasylko, his mother and his brother Daniel from the region. The family was exiled to Poland. Later Vasylko and his mother Anna-Euphrosyne returned to Volhynia, first settling in Belz, then in Berestia and in 1213 finally establishing a residence in Kamianets on the Horyn, where they lived under patronage of Leszek the White. However, taking advantage of conflicts between Galician boyars, Hungarians and Poles, the two brothers started a fight to reclaim their rule over Galicia-Volhynia. In 1227 Daniel appointed Vasylko prince of Lutsk, Peresopnytsia and Berestia, and in 1238 his realm spread to western Volhynia including the city of Volodymyr. After the Mongol invasion of Rus' Vasylko was forced to acknowledge Tatar suzerainty, but remained a ruler. In 1259 he was ordered to burn all of his fortifications except of Kholm. Vasylko took part in Burundai's campaigns against Lithuania (1258) and Poland (1259). After the death of Daniel Vasylko became the eldest representative of the Romanovichi dynasty and was de facto ruler of all Galicia-Volhynia.

== Family ==
Parents

- Roman the Great
- Anna-Euphrosyne

Siblings

- Daniel of Galicia (1201–1264)

Children

- Volodymyr Vasylkovych
- Olha

== Sources ==
- Magocsi, Paul Robert (2010). A History of Ukraine: The Land and Its Peoples. Toronto: University of Toronto Press. p. 894. ISBN 9781442610217.

Vasylko Romanovych Romanovichi Born: 1203 Died: 1269
Regnal titles
Titles in pretence
Preceded by Sviatoslav III	Grand Prince of Kiev; 1252–1269	Succeeded by Vasily of Kostroma
Preceded by Ivan Vsevolodovich	2nd in line to Grand Prince of Kiev; 1247–1252	Succeeded by Andrey II
