= Principality of Volhynia =

State in Eastern Europe

Principality of Volhynia Волинське князівство (Ukrainian)
- 987–1199/1452
- Coat of arms

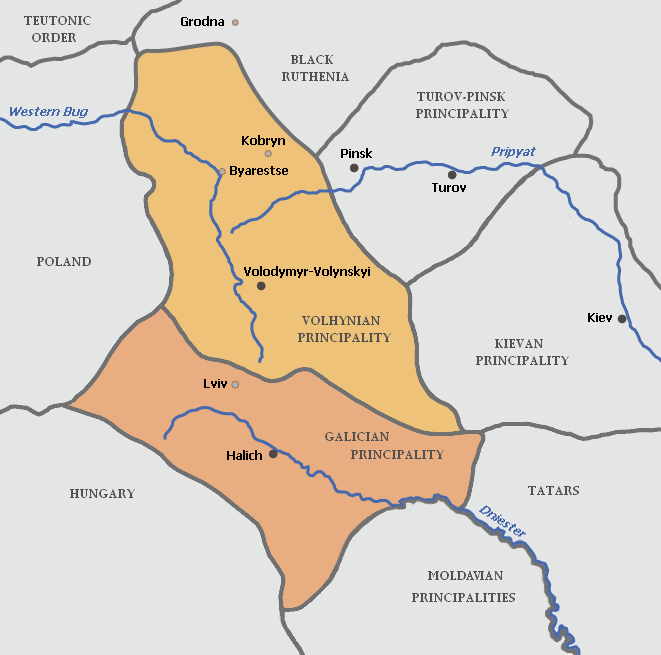
- Principality of Volhynia (shown in orange)
- Capital: Volodymyr
- Common languages: Old East Slavic
- Religion: Eastern Orthodox
- Government: Monarchy
- History
  - Established: 987
  - United with Halych into Principality of Galicia-Volhynia: 1199
  - War for succession between Poland and Lithuania: 1340–1392
  - Incorporated into Lithuania: 1452
Preceded by
Kievan Rus'
Yotvingia
Succeeded by
Kingdom of Galicia–Volhynia
Grand Duchy of Lithuania
Kingdom of Poland

The Principality of Volhynia (Ukrainian: Волинське князівство) was a western Kievan Rus' principality founded by the Rurikid prince Vsevolod in 987 centered in the region of Volhynia, straddling the borders of modern-day Ukraine, Belarus, and Poland. From 1069 to 1118, it belonged to the Izyaslavichi who primarily ruled from Turov (see Principality of Turov). After losing Turov to the Monomakhovichi in 1105, the descendants of Iziaslav Yaroslavovich for a few years continued to rule in Volhynia. From 1154 to 1199, the Principality was referred to as the Principality of Volodymyr (Latin: Lodomeria) when the Principality of Lutsk (1154–1228) was separated.

== Territory ==
The principality held the lands of the historic region of Volhynia from where it acquired its name. The capital of the principality as well as the largest and most important city of the region was Volodymyr. Other notable cities in the principality include Kremenets, Lutsk, Busk, Dorogobuzh, Brest, Belz, and Shumsk.

== History ==
Principality of Volhynia in green

The Principality of Volhynia along with her sister state, the Principality of Halych were formed by sons of the ruling Rurikid clan in Kiev. Iziaslav Mstislavich, the grandson of Vladimir Monomakh, moved to Volodymyr and started ruling it as his own possession, defeating a number of attempts to restore control by Kyivan princes. After Iziaslav's death in 1154, his son Mstislav defeated another attempt to bring his land under Kyiv's control.

After Mstislav's death, the principality was divided between his sons, one of whom, Roman, managed to reunite the land under his rule. Following the death of the prince of Halych Volodymyr Yaroslavovych in 1199, the Halych line of the Rurikid family had become extinct and the prince of Volhynia, Roman the Great annexed the principality, moved his seat to the city of Old Halych and formed the united Kingdom of Galicia-Volhynia.

== Princes ==
- 987–1013 Vsevolod Volodymyrovych (brother of Yaroslav the Wise)

=== Yaroslavovychi ===
- ? – 1054 Sviatoslav II of Kiev (son of Yaroslav the Wise)
- 1054–1057 Igor Yaroslavich (son of Yaroslav the Wise)

=== Volodymyrovychi ===
- 1057–1064 Rostislav of Tmutarakan

=== Yaroslavovychi / Izyaslavovychi ===
- 1069–1086 Yaropolk Izyaslavich (King of Rus since 1078)
  - 1073–1078 occupation by Olehovychi (Oleg I of Chernigov, progenitor of the Olgovichi clan)
  - 1086–1100 occupation by Ihorevychi (Davyd Ihorevych)
- 1099–1100 Mstislav Svyatopolchych
- 1100–1118 Yaroslav Svyatopolchych

=== Monomakhovychi ===
- 1118–1119 Roman Volodymyrovych
- 1119–1135 Andrew the Good
- 1135–1141 Iziaslav II of Kiev (progenitor of the Iziaslavichi of Volhynia)
  - 1141–1146 occupation by Olehovychi Sviatoslav III of Kiev
- 1146–1149 Volodymyr of Dorohobuzh

=== Monomakhovychi / Mstislavovychi (senior line) ===
- 1149–1151 Iziaslav II of Kiev
- 1149–1154 Svyatopolk Mstislavych
- 1154–1157 Vladimir III Mstislavich
- 1157–1170 Mstislav II of Kiev
- 1170–1205 Roman the Great (progenitor of the Romanovichi)
  - 1205–1208 occupation of Galicia-Volhynia by Olhovychi-Ihorevychi (Svyatoslav III Igorevich)
- 1208–1215 Oleksandr of Belz
- 1215–1238 Daniel of Galicia
- 1238–1269 Vasylko Romanovych
- 1269–1289 Volodymyr Vasylkovych
- 1289–c. 1292 Mstyslav Danylovych
- c. 1292–1301 Lev I of Galicia
- 1301–1308 Yuri I of Galicia
- 1308–1323 Andrew of Galicia

=== Piast vs Romanovichi ===
- 1323–1325 Volodymyr Lvovych
- 1325–1340 Yuri II Boleslav
  - 1323–1349 Halych boyars led by Dmytro Dedko

=== Gediminids ===
- 1340–1392 Wars for succession of the Kingdom of Ruthenia between Poland and Lithuania
  - 1340–1384 Liubartas
  - 1384–1392 Teodoras Liubartaitis
- 1430s–1452 Švitrigaila during the Lithuanian Civil War (1432–1438)

== See also ==
- Bibliography of Russian history
