= Duchy of Kraków =

1227–1320 duchy in Lesser Poland

Duchy of Kraków Księstwo krakowskie (Polish) Ducatus Cracoviensis (Latin)
- 1227–1320
- Coat of arms

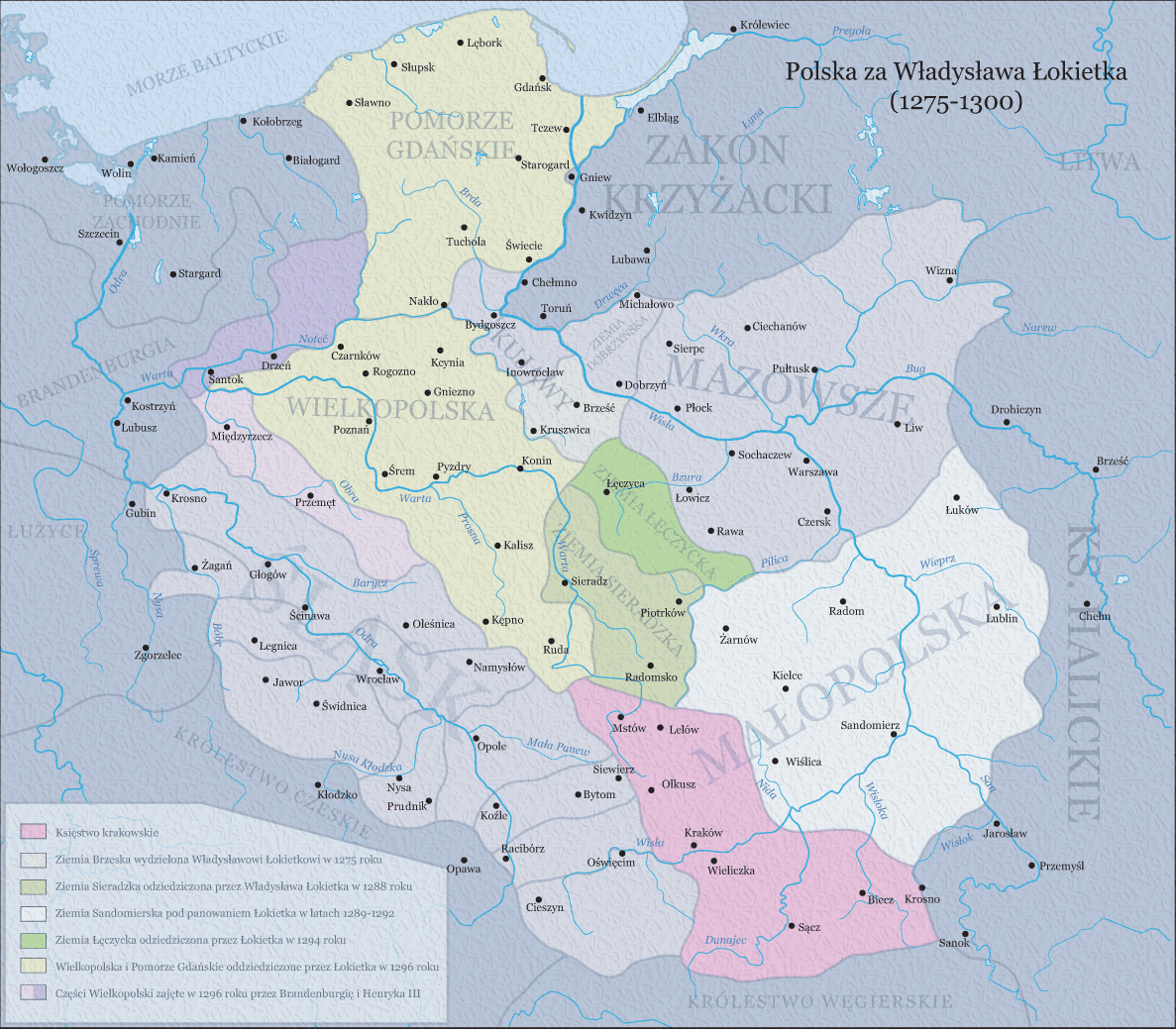
- Map of division of Poland between 1275 and 1300, including the Duchy of Kraków
- Status: Independent state (1227–1300); Fiefdom within the Kingdom of Poland (1300–1320)
- Capital: Kraków
- Official languages: Polish, Latin
- Religion: Roman Catholic
- Government: Feudal Duchy
- Duke
  - 1228–1229 (first): Władysław III Spindleshanks
  - 1291–1300 (last): Wenceslaus II of Bohemia
- Historical era: High Middle Ages
  - Abolishment of Duchy of Poland: 1227
  - Becoming a fiefdom within the Kingdom of Poland: 1300
  - Unification of the Kingdom of Poland: 1320
Preceded by	Succeeded by
Seniorate Province	Kingdom of Poland

Duchy of Kraków (Note: Other renders of the name: Duchy of Cracow, Principality of Cracow, Principality of Kraków) (Note: Polish: Księstwo krakowskie; Latin: Ducatus Cracoviensis) was a duchy in Lesser Poland that existed from 1227 until 1300. Its capital was Kraków. It was formed in 1227 from the Seniorate Province, following the abolishment of the Duchy of Poland. It remained independent until 1300, when it had become a fiefdom within the Kingdom of Poland. In 1320, it was incorporated into the United Kingdom of Poland.

== History ==
After the long-term power struggle Leszek the White was killed in 1227 and the Pomerelian lands got lost, when Duke Swietopelk II of Gdańsk declared himself independent. In 1232 the Silesian duke Henry I the Bearded finally prevailed, re-uniting the thrones of Wrocław and Kraków under his rule as determined by the will of late Duke Bolesław III Krzywousty in 1138. However, a re-establishment of the Polish kingdom under the rule of the Silesian Piasts failed, when Duke Henry's I son Henry II the Pious was killed during the Mongol invasion at the 1241 Battle of Legnica. After an interregnum he was succeeded by Leszek's I son Bolesław V the Chaste, who upon his death in 1279 appointed Konrad's grandson Leszek II the Black of Kuyavia.

The Silesian Piasts once again reached for the Senioral Province, when Leszek II died without heirs in 1288, and Duke Henry IV Probus of Wrocław became High Duke at Kraków but likewise had no issue upon his death in 1290. The Seniorate was again contested between the dukes Przemysł II of Greater Poland and Władysław I the Elbow-high of Kuyavia. Przemysł II brought the royal Přemyslid dynasty of Bohemia into the Polish affairs, when he allied with King Wenceslaus II, whom he ceded the throne at Kraków. In 1295 however, he switched sides and had himself crowned as King of Poland (the first since the deposition of Bolesław II the Bold in 1079) at Greater Polish Gniezno. As he was killed the next year, Władysław I proclaimed himself his successor, he nevertheless had to deal with the permanent pressure by the claimants of the Bohemian Přemyslid and Luxembourg dynasties, who had begun to vassalize the southwestern Silesian duchies.

In 1320 Władysław I, against the fierce resistance of King John of Bohemia, reached the consent by Pope John XXII to have himself crowned Polish king at Kraków. The Duchy of Kraków was finally incorporated into the Lands of the Polish Crown as Kraków Voivodeship. Władysław's I successor King Casimir III the Great had to buy off the Bohemian claims by renouncing Silesia in the 1335 Treaty of Trentschin.

== List of rulers ==
- Władysław III Spindleshanks (1228–1229)
- Konrad I of Masovia (1229–1232)
- Henry the Bearded (1232–1238)
- Henry II the Pious (1238–1241)
- Bolesław II the Horned (1241)
- Konrad I of Masovia (1241–1243)
- Bolesław V the Chaste (1243–1279)
- Leszek II the Black (1279–1288)
- Bolesław II of Masovia (1288)
- Henryk IV Probus (1288–1289)
- Bolesław II of Masovia (1289)
- Władysław I Łokietek (1289)
- Henryk IV Probus (1289–1290)
- Przemysł II (1290–1291)
- Wenceslaus II of Bohemia (1291–1300)
