= Ivan Rostyslavych Berladnik =

- Prince of Zvenyhorod and Galicia-Volhynia
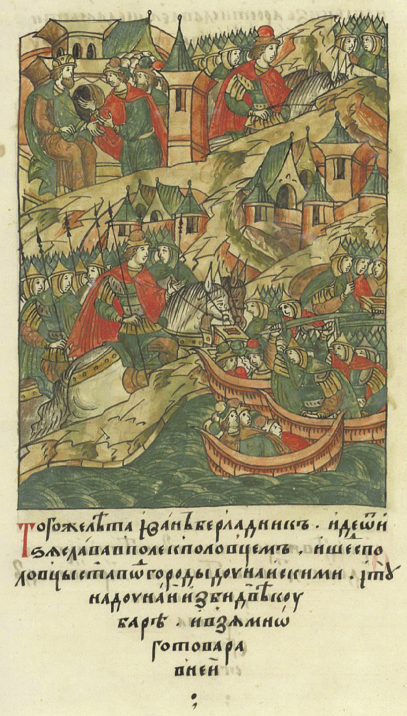
- Ivan robs warships, miniature from the Illustrated Chronicle of Ivan the Terrible (16th century)
- Reign: (Galicia) 1145 (Zvenyhorod) 1129–1145
- Died: 1162; Thessaloniki
- House: Rurik
- Father: Rostyslav Volodarovych

Ivan Rostyslavych Berladnik (Ukrainian: Іван Ростиславич Берладник, romanized: Ivan Rostyslavovych Berladnyk, Polish: Iwan Berładnik, Romanian: Ivan Berladnic) was Prince of Zvenyhorod (1129–1145) and Galicia–Volhynia (1145). Ivan was the son of Rostyslav Volodarevych and the grandson of Volodar of Peremyshl.

Berladnik derives from the time when he lived and ruled in Berlad (currently Bârlad in Romania), among the Berladnici. He was forced to flee there in 1144 after the Boyars of Halych tried to place Berladnik on the throne which was occupied by Volodymyrko Volodarovych. He then went on to the court in Kyiv in 1145 where Berladnik remained until 1158, when he returned to Berlad. He also created the Bârlad Trail, and some have suggested that Berladnyk founded the port of Galați and named it after Halych.

Yaroslav Osmomysl's alliance with the kings of Hungary and Poland against the Grand Princes of Kyïv because of their support for Berladnik's attempts to take possession of several towns bordering Volhynia. After many years of warfare, Yaroslav managed to ensure Berladnik's expulsion to Byzantium. Berladnik died in Thessaloniki, reputedly poisoned in 1162.
