= Battle of Wilichów =

1124 battle in Poland

Battle of Wilichow
- Part of Polish–Ruthenian War (1120–1125)
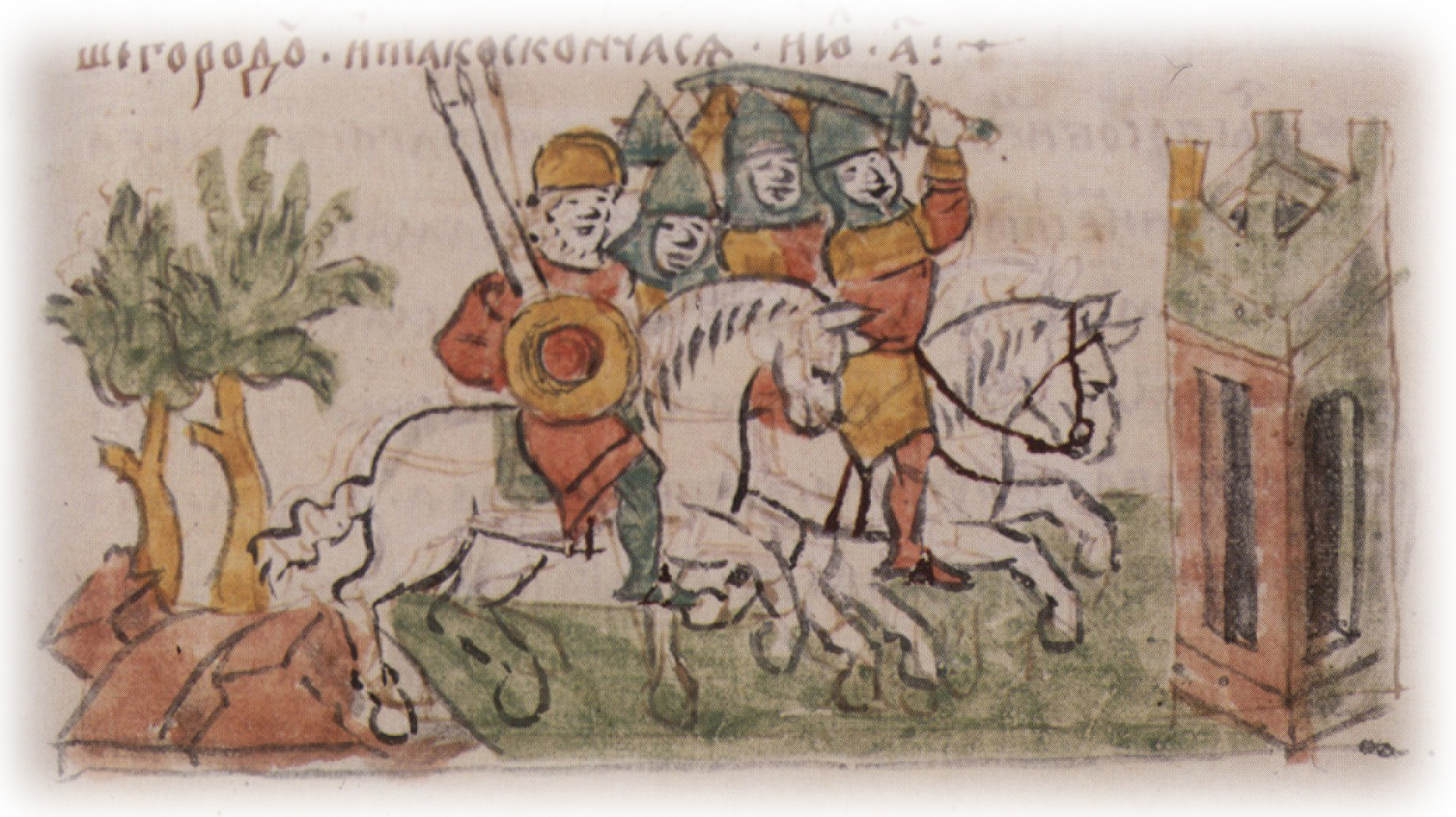
- The campaign of Vladimir Volodarevich Galitsky to the Kiev land
Date	1124
Location	Wilichów
Result	Polish victory

Belligerents
Kingdom of Poland	Principality of Zvenyhorod

Commanders and leaders
Bolesław III Wrymouth	Vladimirko Volodarovich

Casualties and losses
Light	Heavy

Battle of Wilichów was an 1124 battle between Poland and the Principality of Zvenyhorod. After the death of Prince Volodar of Peremyshl, humiliated by his stay in Polish captivity, the throne was assumed by his son Vladimirko, Prince of Zvenyhorod (later Prince of Przemyśl). The young prince, wishing to make up for the losses his family had suffered by paying a ransom for Prince Volodar's release, organised a successful looting expedition against the Polish town of Biecz. However, later that same year, a retaliatory expedition against Vladimir was organised by the Polish Duke Bolesław III Wrymouth. According to the chronicle of Jan Długosz, Bolesław invaded the Principality of Peremyshl and inflicted a military defeat on the young prince in the Battle of Wilichów.
