= Prince of Peremyshl =

The Prince of Peremyshl was the title of the ruler of the Principality of Peremyshl.

== List of princes ==
Term	Prince's name	Reference	Remarks
1085–1092	Ryurik Rostislavich		
1092–1124	Volodar Rostislavich		Previously Prince of Zvenigorod (1084–1092); fought many wars against the Poles, becoming their prisoner briefly in 1121.
1124–1129	Rostislav Volodarevich		
1129–1153	Volodymyrko Volodarovych		Prince of Zvenyhorod (1124–1129) Prince of Terebovlia (1141–1153), and Prince of Halych (1141–1145). He married the daughter of King Coloman of Hungary.
1153–1187	Yaroslav Osmomysl		Also Prince of Halych (1153–1187).
1187–1205	Volodymyr Yaroslavych		Also Prince of Halych (1188; 1190–1199).
1205–1211	Svyatoslav Igorevich		
1211	Danylo Romanovych		
1211–1214	Leszek the White		
1214–1219	Hungarian control		The king of Hungary was Andrew II.
1219–1225	Mstislav Mstislavich		
1227–1231	Yaroslav Ingvarevich		
1231–1234	Aleksandr Vsevolodich		
1234–1240	Rostislav Mikhailovich		Konstantin of Ryazan ruled Peremyshl for Rostislav.
1240–1243	Grigory Vasil'evich		
1243–1245	Rostislav Mikhailovich (again)		
1245–1246	Grigory Vasil'evich (again)		
1246–1249	Rostislav Mikhailovich (again)		
1262–1272	Bela Rostislavich		
1263–1269	Lev Daniilovich		
