= Zvenyhorod =

Rural locality in Lviv Oblast, Ukraine

Coordinates: 49°43′58″N 24°14′49″E

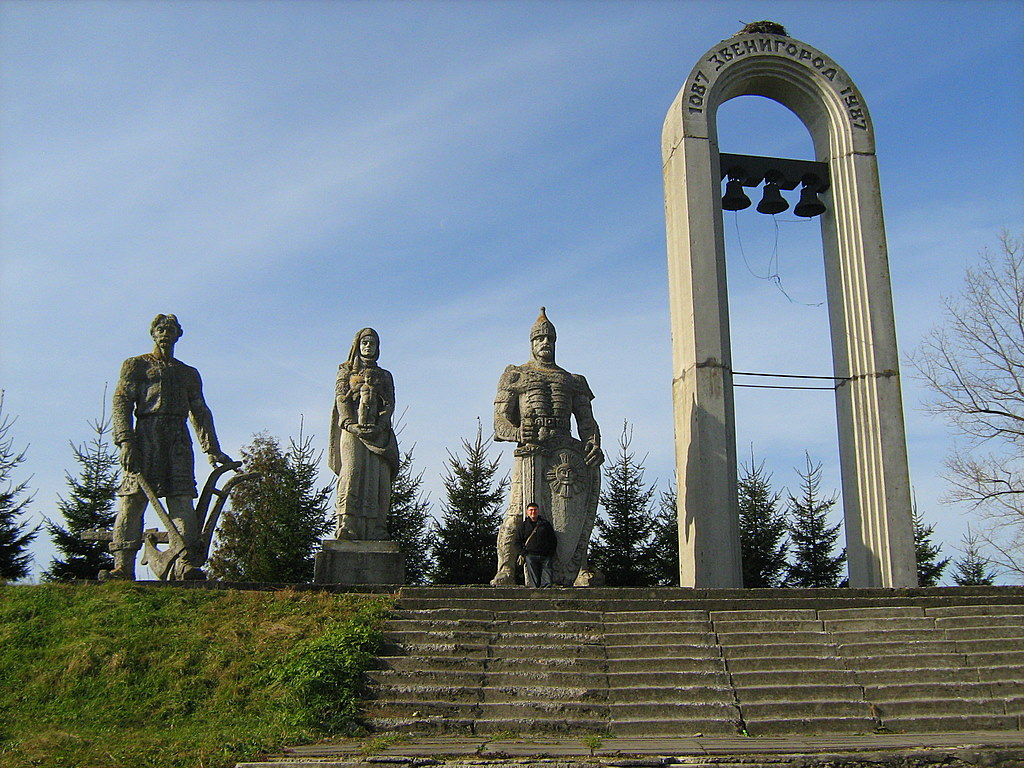
Memorial dedicated to the 900th anniversary of Zvenyhorod

Zvenyhorod (Ukrainian: Звенигород) is a village in Lviv Raion, Lviv Oblast, in the western part of Ukraine. It belongs to Davydiv rural hromada, one of the hromadas of Ukraine. Zvenyhorod was the capital of the former Principality of Zvenyhorod (11th and 12th centuries).

== Geography ==
Zvenyhorod is located 20 kilometers southeast of Lviv, in a swampy area created by the flow of the Bilka river.

== History ==
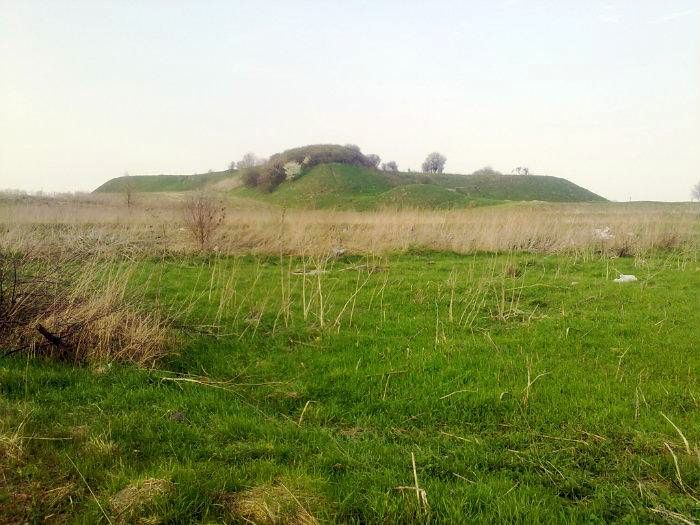
Remains of the ancient settlement

First settlements in the area date to the Paleolithic period. The first mention of Zvenyhorod comes from 1087, when it served as the capital city of prince Volodar Rostyslavych. Between 1124 and 1141 Zvenyhorod came under control of Volodymyrko Volodarovych, who eventually moved his capital to Halych. In 1144 Ivan Rostyslavych ruled the city, and in 1206-1212 it was controlled by Roman Ihorovych.

Zvenyhorod benefitted from its location on a major road crossing, as well as good defensive positions. However, it was destroyed during the Mongol invasion of Kievan Rus. As a result, the settlement declined, losing its importance to Lviv and becoming an ordinary village. Between the late 19th century and World War II the historical sites of Zvenyhorod were studied by a number of historians and archaeologists, including Mykhailo Hrushevsky and Yaroslav Pasternak. Among important archaeological finds made in the area were remains of Roman pottery terra sigillata) from Gaul, as well as seals and remains of a church from the Rus' era.

Until 18 July 2020, Zvenyhorod belonged to Pustomyty Raion. The raion was abolished in July 2020 as part of the administrative reform of Ukraine, which reduced the number of raions of Lviv Oblast to seven. The area of Pustomyty Raion was merged into Lviv Raion.
