= Bârlad Trail =

Medieval trade route

Bârlad Trail (also referred to as the L'viv Road, and the Wallachian, Moldavian, or Oxen Trail) was a medieval trade route, linking the Kingdom of Galicia–Volhynia with the region of Moldavia and the coast of the Black Sea.

When it was first established, the trail began in Przemyśl, and then went through Halych, Kolomyia, Sniatyn, Chernivtsi, Bârlad, Iași to Galați.

Ivan Rostyslavych Berladnik, known as Iwan Berładnik to the Poles, was the founder of the Bârlad Trail. Some have suggested that Berladnik's rival, Yaroslav Osmomysl, has founded the port of Galați and named it "Little Halych" after Halych.
