= Battle of Lutsk (1256) =

1256 battle between Galicia–Volhynia and Lithuania

- Part of the Kuremsa War
Date	1256
Location	Lutsk, Volhynia, Galicia–Volhynia (present-day Ukraine)
Result	Galician–Volhynian victory

Belligerents
Galicia–Volhynia	Lithuania

Commanders and leaders
Yuri Domazhyrych; Oleksa Orishok	Khval †; Syrvyd Rushkovych

Strength
Unknown	Unknown; more than Rus'

Casualties and losses
Unknown	Most of the army killed

The Battle of Lutsk in 1256 was a confrontation between the Galician–Volhynian forces led by courtiers Yuri Domazhyrych and Oleksa Orishok against the Lithuanian armies of voivode Khval and Syrvyd Rushkovych. The battles resulted in Galician–Volhynian victory and a disastrous route of the Lithuanian army.

== Prelude ==
In 1255–1256, the Kingdom of Galicia–Volhynia carried out a successful campaign against the Golden Horde during their war, retaking their previously occupied lands. However, Galician–Volhynian princes Danylo and Vasylko were unable to carry out further actions against Tatars due to their clashes with Lithuania.

The Lithuanians offered a support for Galicia–Volhynia in their war against the Golden Horde. However, in reality, the Lithuanians intended to use this as an opportunity to catch Danylo and Vasylko off guard, so the Lithuanian armies could plunder their lands, due to their grudge against prince Danylo.

== Battle ==
The Lithuanian armies of voivode Khval and Syrvyd Rushkovych entered the lands of Galicia–Volhynia, with the purpose of devastating Ruthenia. Voivode Khval previously distinguished himself in his raids on the Principality of Chernigov.

The main Galician–Volhynian armies of Danylo and Vasylko weren't present in the kingdom at the time, leaving only the local militias under courtiers Yuri Domazhyrych and Oleksa Orishok to fend off the Lithuanian invaders. However, as the Lithuanians were plundering outskirts of Lutsk, Domazhyrych and Orishok used this as an opportunity to ambush the Lithuanian forces. As a result, the Lithuanians were caught by surprise and forced into a chaotic retreat, getting driven into the river. This led to heavy losses among Lithuanians, with many drowning in process. Some Lithuanians attempted to save themselves by grabbing onto their horses to avoid drowning.

== Aftermath ==
The battle resulted in Galician–Volhynian victory, with chronicles describing numerous corpses of Lithuanian troops and their equipment floating in the river, which was looted by Ruthenians. Lithuanian voivode Khval was killed, while Syrvyd Rushkovych narrowly escaped. Princes Danylo and Vasylko celebrated the "great slaughter" of the "heathen" Lithuanians, viewing it as a divine punishment for Khval's raids on Chernigov.
