= Abrykosivka, Khmelnytskyi Oblast =

Village in Khmelnytskyi Oblast, Ukraine

Abrykosivka Абрикосівка
- Village
- Location within Ukraine Location within Khmelnytskyi Oblast
- Coordinates: 48°43′54″N 26°42′27″E
- Country: Ukraine
- Oblast: Khmelnytskyi Oblast
- Raion: Kamianets-Podilskyi Raion
- Hromada: Humentsi rural hromada
- First mention: 1460

Area
  - Land: 1,563 km^{2} (603 sq mi)

Population (2001)
  - Total: 529
- Postal code: 32351

Abrykosivka (Ukrainian: Абрикосівка; Old Polish: Beznoskowce) (Also known as Bezniskivtsi (Ukrainian: Безнісківці) until 1966) is a village in the Kamianets-Podilskyi Raion of the Khmelnytskyi Oblast of Ukraine. It is a part of the Humentsi rural hromada.

== Etymology ==
The village's historical name, Bezniskivtsi, was changed to Abrykosivka on August 15, 1966, by the Decree of the Presidium of the Supreme Soviet of the Ukrainian SSR. In a cultural move, the Soviet authority changed lots of archaic oikonim-suffixed places, including those ending in -ivtsi (-івці). According to local legend, the old name of the city comes from a tale that the first settler was a man without a nose (Bez nis (без ніс) means "without nose" in Ukrainian).

There are multiple settlements in Ukraine with the name Abrykosivka, including two in Crimea, one in Zaporizhia, and one in Kherson.

== Geography ==
Abrykosivka is located in the southwestern part of Ukraine, 15 kilometers from Kamianets-Podilskyi. 7 kilometers from the center of the village is national highway N03. To the south, Abykosivka borders the village of Kalynya, and to the west it borders a forest that separates it from the village of Boryshkivtsi.

=== Climate ===
The village is subject to a humid continental climate with warm summers. The water level in rivers is 20% of its capacity, causing a significant portion of the region to become more arid.

== History ==
=== Pre-Russian ===
Prior to advanced civilization settlement, Abrykosivka was part of land of the Trypillian culture. The first mention of the town occurs in 1460, in a royal document granting permission for bishops to take tithes.

Historical population
Year	Pop.	±% p.a.
1989	646	—
1998	563	−1.52%
2001	516	−2.86%
2010	504	−0.26%
2011	506	+0.40%
2012	505	−0.20%
2013	495	−1.98%
2015	450	−4.65%

In 1493, the Struś family paid tax in the village of Benzniskivtsi for a total of "eight dyms". At the time, the tax, calculated depending on the number of stoves and chimneys in the household, was called a "dym". From 1530 to 1542, the village was owned by 3 families. the Jarosz, Matthias, and Yezhovskyi. They owned 5 1/2 fields. In 1565, a canon of the Kamianets-Podolskyi Catholic clergy, Thomas Hintor, owned and paid a tax for seven fields in Bezniskivtsi. In 1729, a wooden three-domed church of the patronage of St. Nicholas was built in the village.

=== Russian occupation ===
From the mid-17th century until 1793, Bezniskivtsi, as part of Podolia, was a part of the Polish–Lithuanian Commonwealth. Following the Second Partition of Poland, it became part of the Podolian Governorate of the Russian Empire.

In the 18th century, the landholders of Bezniskivtsi were Andrii Hurvskyi of Hurov, a Podolian stolnik, Mr. Zubarzhevskyi, a treasurer from Zwinogrod, and Franciszek Xavierusz Kackowski, a judge from Kamianets. In 1861, the peasants of the village were freed from serfdom. To commemorate the event, many villages in the area installed commemorative monuments in entrances to their villages, such as those in Nihyn and Cherche.

In 1881, a stone version of the St. Nicholas Church was built. In 1894, a parochial school was opened.

Empress Catherine the Great granted control of the land that the village is located in to the nieces of Prince Grigory Potemkin. At the beginning of the 19th century, one of them, Alexandra Branitskaya, sold the part of the village that belonged to her. In the late-19th century, the land belonged to Kamianets lawyer Danylo Babychov, with his estate managed by Lukyan Sosnovskyi.

Following the October Revolution, the village was occupied by Russian Bolshevik factions. Under occupation, Bezniskivtsi became the center of the local village council. In 1959, as a result of consolidation, was merged with the Suprunkivtsi village council. In 1924, the Agricultural Proletarian artel was organized in Bezniskivtsi, led by Semen Hytilis and Alexander Sas.

From 1932 to 1933, the villagers suffered genocide during the Holodomor. In 1941, Nazis invaded the area as part of Operation Barbarossa. Soviet rule was reestablished in the village in 1944. From 1946 to 1947, another famine was experienced in the village.

=== Post-Soviet era ===
The village was renamed to Abrykosivka in 1966, and on August 24, 1991, the village became part of the independent country of Ukraine. In 1994, the Abrykosivka village council was established, consisting of the namesake and of Korchivka. In a 2015 merger, the village became part of the Humentsi village community.

In 2008, infrastructure allowing for natural gas was laid in Abrykosivka. On June 13, 2023, the parish of St. Nicholas transferred from the Moscow Patriarchate to the Orthodox Church of Ukraine. For the first time, a prayer in the Ukrainian language was spoken in the church.
