= Kingdom of Galicia–Volhynia =

Kingdom in Eastern Europe (1199–1349)

Principality of Galicia–Volhynia (1199–1253) Kingdom of Galicia–Volhynia (1253–1349)
- 1199–1349
- Coat of arms

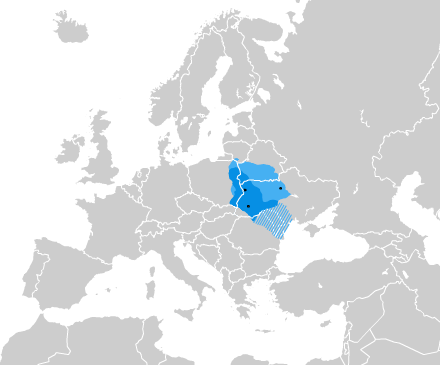
- Map of the Kingdom of Galicia–Volhynia in the 13th/14th century.
- Status: Principality (until 1253); Kingdom (after 1253); Vassal state of the Golden Horde (from 1246 to 1253)
- Capital: Volodymyr; Halych; Chełm; (1241–1272); Lviv; (1272–1301); 49°55′N 24°58′E
- Common languages: Old East Slavic
- Religion: Eastern Orthodoxy
- Government: Monarchy
- Prince, later King
  - 1199–1205: Roman the Great (first)
  - 1341–1349: Liubartas (last)
  - since 1349: Casimir III the Great as added title to the King of Poland
- Historical era: Middle Ages
  - Unification of Galicia and Volhynia: 1199
  - Kingdom: 1253
  - Transfer of Galicia to the Polish Crown: 1349
  - Incorporation of Galicia by Poland: 1434
  - Incorporation of Volhynia by Lithuania: 1452
Preceded by
Principality of Galicia
Principality of Volhynia
Succeeded by
Ruthenian Voivodeship
Volhynian Voivodeship
Duchy of Podolia

The Kingdom of Galicia–Volhynia, (Note: It is also called Galich-Volhyn, Galicia–Volynia, Galicia–Volyn, and Galich–Volyn, Halych–Volhyn, Halych–Volhynia, or Galicia–Volodimer' (Old East Slavic: Кънѧжьство Галичьскоє и Волыньскоє; Ukrainian: Галицько-Волинське князівство, romanized: Halytsko-Volynske kniazivstvo; Latin: Regnum Galiciae et Lodomeriae; Polish: Księstwo halicko-wołyńskie)) known as the Principality of Galicia–Volhynia before 1253, and also known as the Kingdom of Ruthenia or Kingdom of Rus', (Note: (Old East Slavic: Королєвство Русь, romanized: Korolevstvo Rusĭ Ukrainian: Королівство Русь, romanized: Korolivstvo Rus; Latin: Regnum Russiae),) was a medieval state in Eastern Europe which existed from 1199 to 1349. Its territory was predominantly located in modern-day Ukraine, with parts in Belarus, Poland, Romania, Moldova, and Lithuania. Along with Novgorod and Vladimir-Suzdal, it was one of the three most important powers to emerge from the collapse of Kievan Rus'.

Roman the Great united the principalities of Galicia and Volhynia at the turn of the 13th century. Following the destruction wreaked by the Mongol invasion of Kievan Rus' (1239–1241), Prince Daniel of Galicia and other princes of Rus' pledged allegiance to Batu Khan of the Golden Horde in 1246. In 1253 Daniel was crowned King of Ruthenia by the Pope in an attempt to create an anti-Mongol alliance. However the attempts to free Ruthenia from the influence of Golden Horde khans ultimately failed. Polish conquest of the kingdom in 1349 led to it being fully absorbed by Catholic Poland.

Upon annexing Galicia in 1349, Polish king Casimir III the Great adopted the title of King of Poland and Ruthenia, and in 1434 the territory was transformed into the Ruthenian Voivodeship (Latin: Palatinatus Russiae), with the last remnants of the region's legal autonomy being abolished in 1506. Volhynia, which came under control of the Grand Duchy of Lithuania following a series of wars with Poland, formally became a Lithuanian province in 1452.

== History ==
=== Origins ===
The Principality of Volhynia may have emerged as early as the late 10th century, with Vsevolod, a son of Vladimir I of Kiev, mentioned as a prince of the city of Volodymyr. Igor Yaroslavich reportedly briefly reigned as the prince of Volodymyr in the 1050s. Iaroslav Sviatopolkovich (r. 1100–1118) was the only prince in Kievan Rus' to oppose Vladimir II Monomakh's reign on the grounds of agnatic seniority, but after Vladimir ousted him in 1118, (Note: This event is recorded as the first entry in the Kievan Chronicle, mentioned sub anno 1118.) his Monomakhovichi descendants established a local dynastic branch. Roman Mstislavich, the great-great-grandson of Monomakh, inherited the throne of Volhynia in 1170.

The Principality of Galicia was formed in the years 1124–1144 by Vladimirko Volodarovich's unification of the principalities of Zvenyhorod, Peremyshl, and Terebovlia. Since the 1080s or 1090s, all three had been ruled by sons of prince Rostislav of Tmutarakan, who may or may not also have been a prince in Volhynia and Galicia c. 1054/1060 to 1067.

=== Reign of Roman the Great (1199–1205) ===
Galicia–Volhynia was created following the death in 1198 or 1199 (and without a recognized heir in the paternal line) of the last Prince of Galicia, Vladimir II Yaroslavich. Roman acquired the Principality of Galicia and united his lands into one state. He did so upon the invitation of the Galician boyars, who expected that Roman would be an "absentee" Volhynian prince ruling from afar so that they could increase their own power. On the contrary, Roman curbed their power, expelled any boyar who opposed him, and increased the influence of the urban and rural populace.

In Roman's time Galicia–Volhynia's principal cities were Halych and Volodymyr. Roman was allied with Poland, signed a peace treaty with Hungary and developed diplomatic relations with the Byzantine Empire. The grand prince of Kiev, Rurik Rostislavich (Rurik II), forged a coalition of Rus' princes and attacked Galicia-Volhynia, but Roman defeated them and captured Kiev in 1200. However, because the old capital of Kievan Rus' was no longer a strong power centre by that time, Roman kept the prosperous Halych as his capital and appointed subordinates to administer Kiev in his name. He then mounted two successful campaigns against the Cumans, in 1201–2 and 1203–4. In 1203 Roman also extended his rule to the Principality of Pereyaslavl. During his absence, Rurik II retook and heavily sacked Kiev in 1203 with the help of Polovtsians and Chernihivians. In 1204 Roman recaptured Kiev once more, marking the height of his reign: he briefly became the most powerful of the Rus' princes. He married the niece of the Byzantine emperor Alexios III, for whom Galicia was the main military ally against the Cumans. The relation with Byzantium helped to stabilize Galicia's relations with the Rus' population of the Lower Dniester and the Lower Danube.

=== War of the Galician Succession (1205–1245) ===
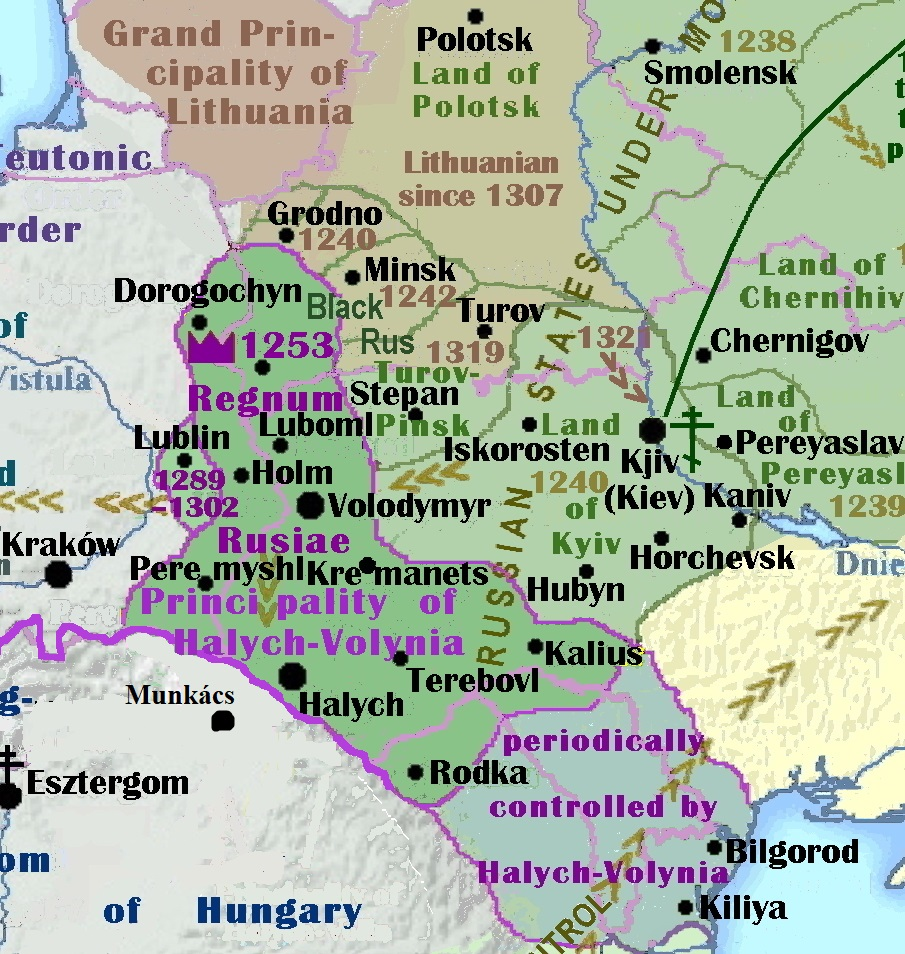
The Kingdom of Galicia–Volhynia ("Principality of Halych-Volynia") during the years 1245–1349

In 1205, Roman's alliance with the Poles broke down, leading to a conflict with Leszek the White and Konrad of Masovia. Roman was subsequently killed by Polish forces in the Battle of Zawichost (1205), triggering a war of succession, while his dominion entered a period of rebellion and chaos that lasted almost 40 years. In this time, the Galician boyars made efforts to prevent the establishment of a hereditary princely dynasty, especially by Roman's son Daniel, and instead put all sorts of puppets on the throne which they could easily control. Thus weakened by war between Galician boyars and some appanage princes, Galicia–Volhynia also became an arena of rivalry between Poland and Hungary, which intervened in the region several times. Roman's successors would mostly use Halych (Galicia) as the designation of their combined kingdom. King Andrew II of Hungary styled himself rex Galiciæ et Lodomeriæ, Latin for "king of Galicia and Vladimir [in-Volhynia]", a title that was later adopted by the House of Habsburg.

After Roman's death, the Galician boyars first drove Roman's widow Anna-Euphrosyne and two sons Daniel and Vasylko from the region. From 1206 to 1212, the Principality of Galicia was controlled by the three sons of the Novgorod-Seversk prince Igor Svyatoslavich: Vladimir III Igorevich, Svyatoslav III Igorevich, and Roman II Igorevich. They were defeated by Galician boyars, and the boyar Volodyslav Kormylchych assumed the throne of Galicia in 1213 or 1214, the only non-Rurikid ever to rule any of the Rus' principalities. After he was removed, a compromise agreement was concluded in 1214 between Hungary and Poland, who partitioned the Galician lands. The throne of Galicia–Volhynia was given to Andrew's son, Coloman of Lodomeria, who had married Leszek the White's daughter, Salomea.

In 1221, Mstislav Mstislavich, son of Mstislav Rostislavich (descendant of the princes of Novgorod), liberated Galicia–Volhynia from the Hungarians and Poles. During Mstislav's 1221–1228 reign, the Galician and Volhynian armies participated in the Battle of the Kalka River (1223) against the Mongols, but in 1228 the boyars expelled him and transferred the Principality of Galicia to the king of Hungary. It was Daniel of Galicia, son of Roman, who formed a real union of Volhynia and Galicia. Daniel first established himself in Volhynia. After failing to retake his father's other throne in 1230–1232 and 1233–1235, Daniel succeeded upon his third attempt and conquered Galicia in 1238, reunited Galicia and Volhynia, and ruled for a quarter century. In March 1238, he defeated the Teutonic Knights of the Order of Dobrzyń in the Battle of Drohiczyn. (Note: The Order of Dobrzyń was named after the now-Polish town of Dobrzyń nad Wisłą (Ukrainian: Добжинь-над-Віслою, romanized: Dobzhynj-nad-Visloyu). The site of the battle was the now-Polish town of Drohiczyn (Ukrainian: Дорогичин, romanized: Dorohychyn).) Daniel captured Kiev in 1239, just before the Mongols besieged, conquered and sacked the city in late 1240. On 17 August 1245, Daniel and his brother Vasylko defeated the Polish and Hungarian forces (weakened by the first Mongol invasion of Poland and the first Mongol invasion of Hungary in early 1241) in the Battle of Yaroslavl, taking full control of Galicia–Volhynia. The brothers also crushed Rostislav Mikhailovich, son of the prince of Chernigov, who had allied with Hungary and Poland against them.

=== Reign of Daniel (1245–1264) ===
Fragment of a copy of the Galician–Volhynian Chronicle, a literary work and historical source of the period

Daniel strengthened his relations with Batu Khan by traveling to his capital Sarai and acknowledging, at least nominally, the supremacy of the Mongol Golden Horde. After meeting with Batu Khan in 1246, Daniel reorganized his army along Mongol lines and equipped it with Mongolian weapons, although Daniel himself maintained the traditional attire of a Rus' prince. According to Vernadsky (1970), Daniel's alliance with the Mongols was merely tactical; he pursued a long-term strategy of resistance to the Mongols. On the other hand, Magocsi (2010) argued that Daniel submitted to the Mongols, citing the Galician–Volhynian Chronicle, which decried Daniel 'is now on his knees and is called a slave' and called this event 'the greatest disgrace'. Magocsi stated that, 'although he never acknowledged it', Daniel was a Mongol vassal, who collected the Mongol tribute, and generally helped 'establishing Mongol administrative control over eastern Europe in cooperation with those Rus' princes who could be made to see the advantages of the new Pax Mongolica.' According to Magocsi, Daniel's submission to the Mongols ensured the strength and prosperity of Galicia–Volhynia. He did renew his alliances with Hungary, Poland and Lithuania, making plans to forge an anti-Mongol coalition with them to wage a crusade against the Khan; although these were never carried out, it eventually led to Daniel's royal coronation by papal legate in 1253. This brought Galicia–Volhynia into the orbit of the western European feudal order, and the Roman Catholic Church.

In 1245, Pope Innocent IV allowed Daniel to be crowned king. Daniel wanted more than recognition, commenting bitterly that he expected an army when he received the crown. Although Daniel promised to promote recognition of the Pope to his people, his realm continued to be ecclesiastically independent from Rome. Thus, Daniel was the only member of the Rurik dynasty to have been crowned king. Daniel was crowned by the papal legate Opizo de Mezzano in Dorohochyn 1253 as the first King of Ruthenia (Rex Russiae; 1253–1264). In 1256, Daniel succeeded in driving the Mongols out of Volhynia, and a year later he defeated their attempts to capture the cities of Lutsk and Volodymyr. Upon the approach of a large army under the Mongolian general Boroldai in 1260; however, Daniel was forced to accept their authority and to raze the fortifications he had built against them.

Under Daniel's reign, the Kingdom of Galicia–Volhynia was one of the most powerful states in east central Europe, and it has been described as a 'golden age' for Galicia–Volhynia. Literature flourished, producing the Galician–Volhynian Chronicle. Demographic growth was enhanced by immigration from the west and the south, including Germans and Armenians. Commerce developed due to trade routes linking the Black Sea with Poland, Germany, and the Baltic basin. Major cities, which served as important economic and cultural centers, included Lviv (where the royal seat would later be moved by Daniel's son), Volodymyr, Halych, Chełm (Daniel's capital), Przemyśl, Drohiczyn, and Terebovlia. Galicia–Volhynia was important enough that in 1252, Daniel was able to marry his son Roman to Gertrude of Babenberg, heiress of the Duchy of Austria, in the vain hope of securing the latter for his family. Another son, Shvarn, married a daughter of Mindaugas, Lithuania's first king, and briefly ruled that land from 1267 to 1269. At the peak of its expansion, the Galician–Volhynian state contained not only south-western Rus lands, including Red Ruthenia and Black Ruthenia, but also briefly controlled the Brodnici on the Black Sea.

=== Reign of Leo I (1264–1301) ===
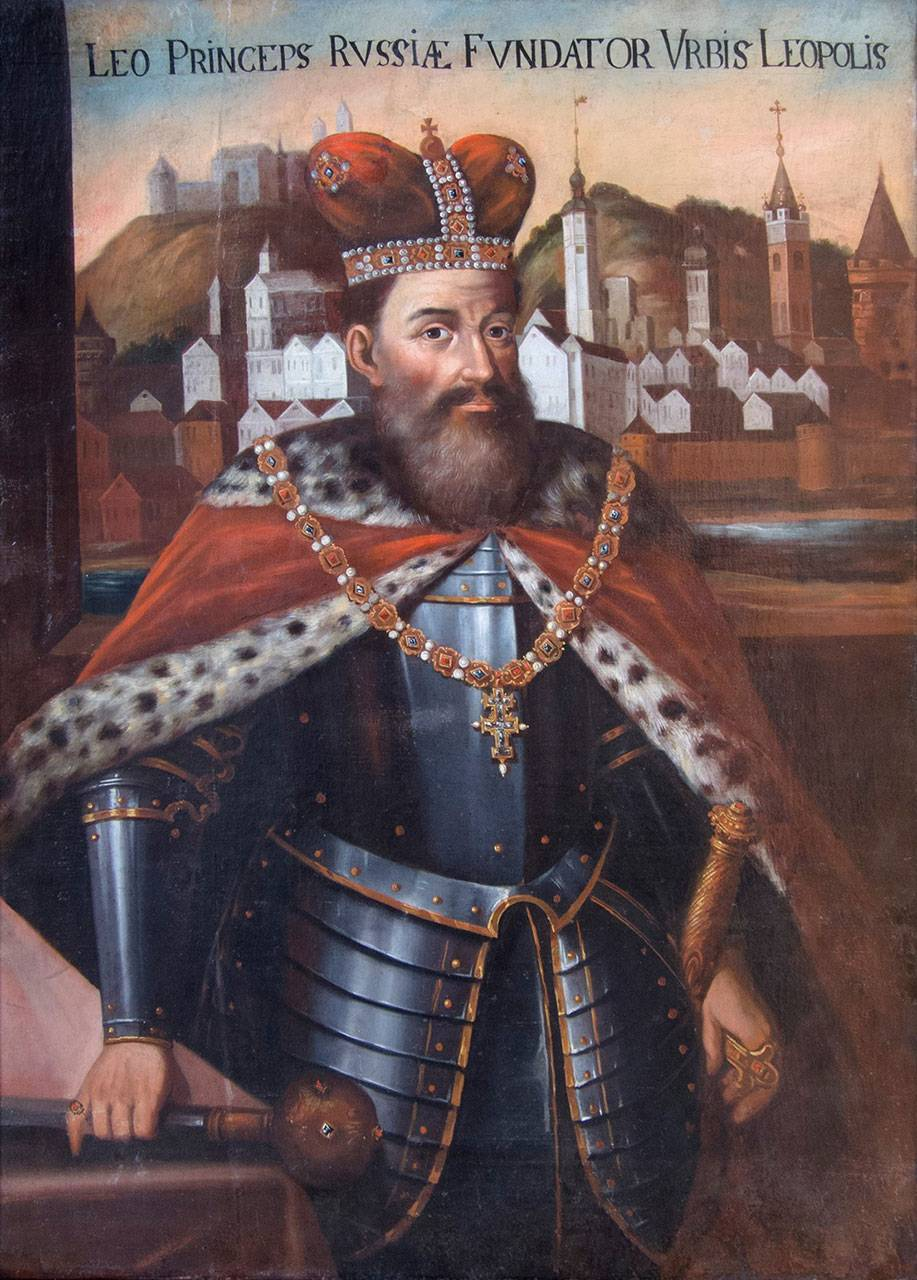
Leo, Ruthenian prince, depicted against the background of the city of Leopolis (modern Lviv)

After Daniel's death in 1264, he was succeeded by his son Leo, who moved the capital from Chełm to Lviv in 1272 and for a time maintained the strength of the Kingdom of Galicia–Volhynia. Unlike his father, who pursued a Western political course, Leo worked closely with the Mongols, in particular cultivating a close alliance with the Tatar Khan Nogai. Together with his Mongol allies, he invaded Poland. However, although his troops plundered territory as far west as Racibórz, sending many captives and much booty back to Galicia, Leo did not ultimately gain much territory from Poland. Leo also attempted, unsuccessfully, to establish his family's rule over Lithuania. Soon after his brother Shvarn ascended to the Lithuanian throne in 1267, he had the former Lithuanian ruler Vaišvilkas killed. Following Shvarn's loss of the throne in 1269, Leo entered into conflict with Lithuania. From 1274 to 1276 he fought a war with the new Lithuanian ruler Traidenis but was defeated, and Lithuania annexed the territory of Black Ruthenia with its city Navahrudak. In 1279, Leo allied himself with king Wenceslaus II of Bohemia and invaded Poland, although his attempt to capture Kraków in 1280 ended in failure. Around the same time, he engaged in conflict with Hungary and may have temporarily occupied some border areas, though claims of annexing parts of Transcarpathia, including Munkács, are not supported by firm historical evidence.

During the Second Mongol invasion of Hungary (1285–1286) and Third Mongol invasion of Poland (1286–1287), Volhynian and Galician troops joined the Mongol and Tatar armies led by Nogai Khan and Talabuga on their campaigns, which ended in defeat. In addition, Tatar troops passing through Galicia–Volynia and wintering there devastated the countryside by destroying crops and looting the region. Even the allied capital city of Lviv was sacked by Talabuga and Nogai in January 1288. Talabuga died in 1291, but Nogai would continue to exert his Mongol influence over the southwestern Rus' principalities until his own death in 1299.

In 1292, Leo successfully took advantage of Poland's internal fragmentation and extended his influence into the Lublin region.

=== Decline (1301–1340) ===
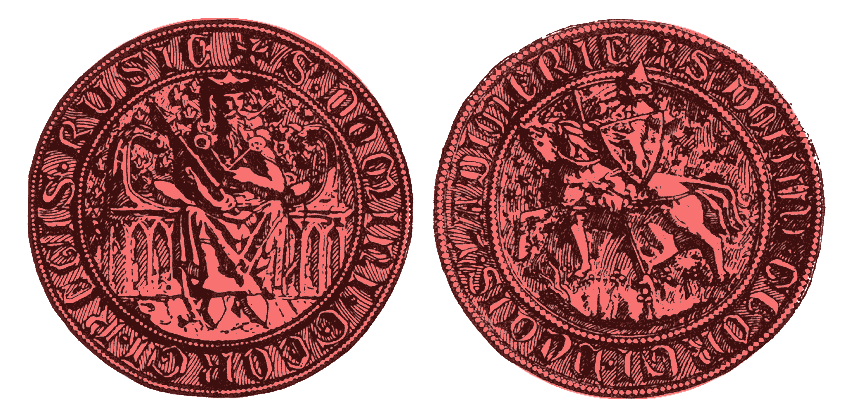
King's seal of Yuri I of Halych (reign: 1301–1308) "S[igillum] Domini Georgi Regis Rusie" (left), "S[igillum] Domini Georgi Ducis Ladimerie" (right).

After Leo's death in 1301, a period of decline ensued. Leo was succeeded by his son Yuri I, who ruled for only seven years. Although his reign was largely peaceful and Galicia–Volhynia flourished economically, Yuri I lost Lublin to the Poles in 1302. From 1308 to 1323, Galicia–Volhynia was jointly ruled by Yuri I's sons Andrew and Leo II, who proclaimed themselves to be the kings of Galicia–Volhynia. The brothers forged alliances with King Władysław I of Poland and the Teutonic Order against the Lithuanians and the Mongols, but the Kingdom was still tributary to the Mongols and joined the Mongol military expeditions of Uzbeg Khan and his successor, Janibeg Khan. The brothers died together in 1323, in battle, fighting against the Mongols, and left no heirs.

After the extinction of the Rurikid dynasty in Galicia–Volhynia in 1323, Volhynia passed into the control of the Lithuanian prince Liubartas, while the boyars took control over Galicia. They invited the Polish prince Yuri II Boleslav, a grandson of Yuri I, to assume the Galician throne. Boleslaw converted to Orthodoxy and assumed the name Yuri II. His encouragement of foreign colonization led to conflicts with the boyars, who then poisoned him in 1340 and offered the throne to Liubartas, within the same year Casimir III of Poland attacked Lviv.

=== Final years and partition between Poland and Lithuania (1341–1392) ===
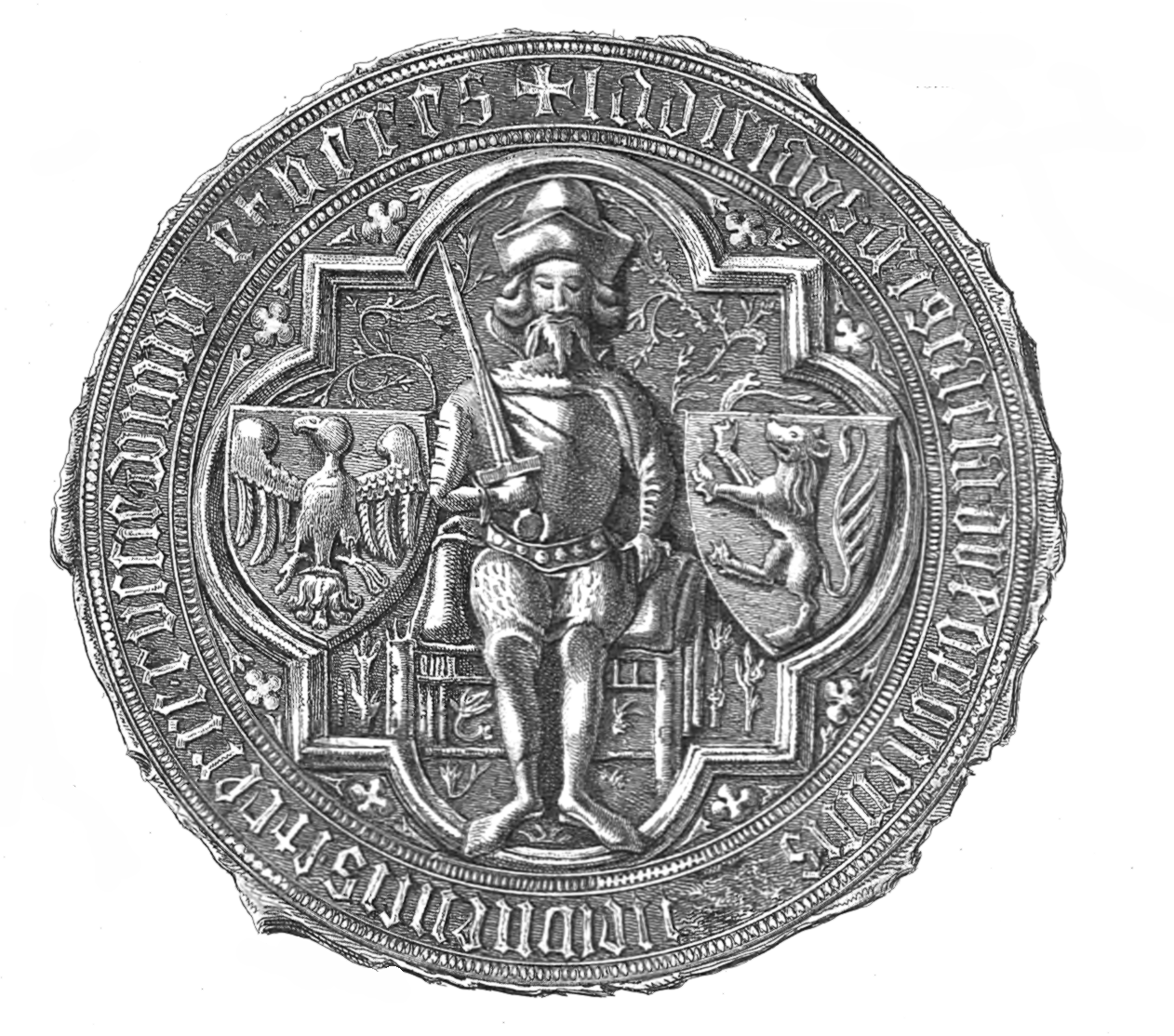
Ducal seal Ladislaus Dei Gracia Dux Opoliensis Wieloniensis et Terre Russie Domin et Heres (ca. 1387)

In winter 1341 Tatars, Ruthenians led by Detko, and Lithuanians led by Liubartas were able to defeat the Poles, although they were not so successful in summer 1341. Finally, Detko was forced to accept Polish overlordship, as a starost of Galicia. After Detko's death, Casimir III mounted a successful invasion, capturing and annexing Galicia in 1349.

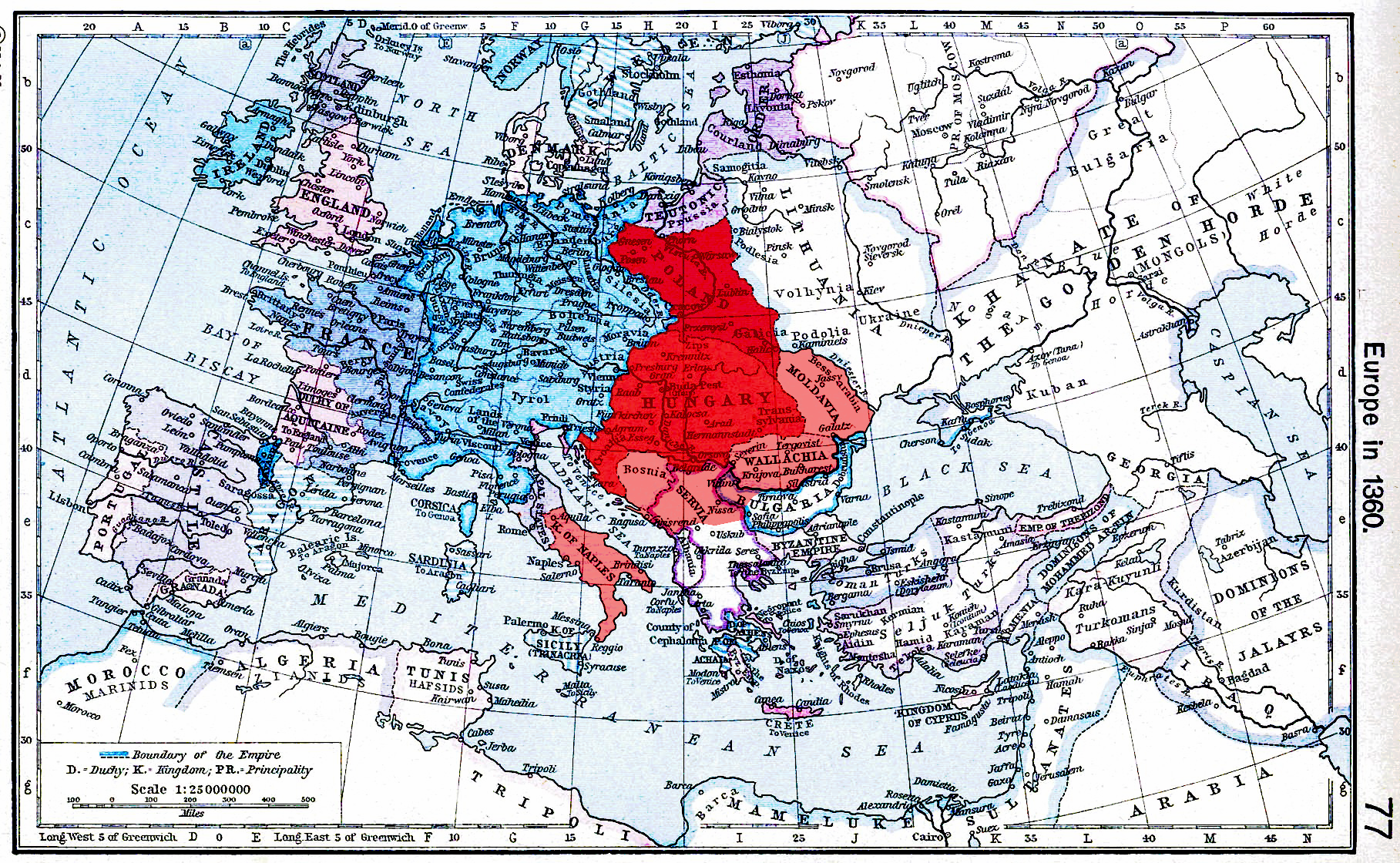
Louis I of Hungary's realm at the end of the 14th century

The Romanovichi (branch of the Rurikid) dynasty of Daniel of Galicia attempted to gain support from Pope Benedict XII and broader European powers for an alliance against the Mongols, but ultimately proved unable to compete with the rising powers of the centralised Grand Duchy of Lithuania and the Kingdom of Poland. Only in 1349, after the occupation of Galicia–Volhynia by an allied Polish-Hungarian force, was Galicia–Volhynia finally conquered and incorporated into Poland. This ended the vassalage of Galicia–Volhynia to the Golden Horde.

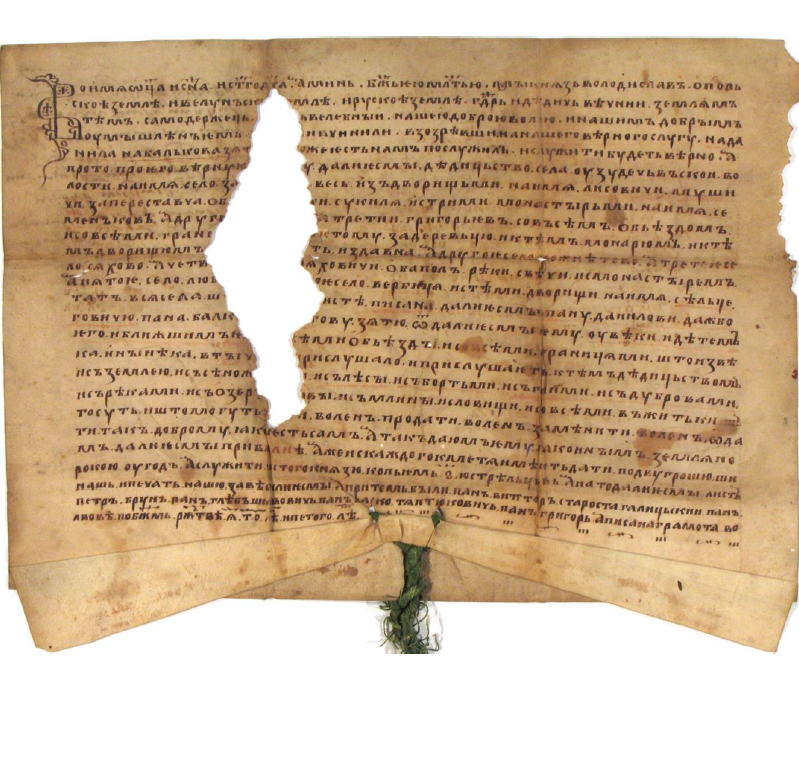
A document of Vladislaus II to Daniel Dazhbohovych written in Cyrillic

From 1340 to 1392, the civil war in the region transitioned into a power struggle between Lithuania, Poland, and Hungary. The first stage of conflict led to the signing of a treaty in 1344 that secured the Principality of Peremyshl for the Crown of Poland, while the rest of the territory belonged to a member of the Gediminid dynasty of Liubartas (Lubart). Eventually by the mid-14th century, the Kingdom of Poland and the Grand Duchy of Lithuania divided up the region between them: King Casimir III took Galicia and Western Volhynia, while the sister state of Eastern Volhynia together with Kiev came under Lithuanian control, 1352–66.

Following the death of Casimir the Great in 1370, Galicia–Volhynia was ruled by Vladislaus II of Opole in 1372–1379 and 1385–1387, as Lord of Ruthenia (Terre Russie Domin), being a descendant of princes of Belz and a subject of King Louis I of Hungary. Vladislaus strongly contributed to the establishment of Roman Catholic Archdiocese of Lviv as part of Polish Catholicisation.

=== Integration into the Kingdom of Poland and Grand Duchy of Lithuania (1392–1452) ===
Starting from the 1340s the elites of Red Ruthenia, both nobles and royal officials, were obliged to serve in the pospolite ruszenie (Latin: expeditio generalis) on par with Polish subjects. The obligation was included into the Statute of Wiślica, whose text was translated into Ruthenian language. In exchange for their service, nobles were granted landholdings, which accelerated the process of colonization and urbanization of the region. In 1410 military units from the lands of Lviv, Halych and Peremyshl fought under king Jogaila in the Battle of Grunwald. Ruthenian nobles subject to the Polish Crown also took part in the war for the Lithuanian throne on the side of Sigismund Kestutaitis against Svitrigaila, and in 1442-1444 Ruthenian knights fought against the Turks in the campaigns of Władysław III. Starting from 1433, Ruthenian noble families of Odrowąż, Oleski and Buczacki were involved in the wars for Moldavian throne. By the 1450s Poland had spread its influence to Western Podolia.

The change of governments and political structures led to increased competition between the local elites of Red Ruthenia, which frequently resulted in violence. For instance, in 1464 the szlachta of Lviv Land proclaimed a confederation against the powerful Odrowąż family, which had settled in the region during the late 14th century. Next year complaints against the local representative of the clan were issued by the nobles of Sambir. Following the creation of Ruthenian Voivodeship in 1434, the lands of Lviv, Sanok, Peremyshl, Halych and Belz were incorporated into the Polish administrative system, and in 1506 Ruthenian law was replaced with the introduction of Polish courts.

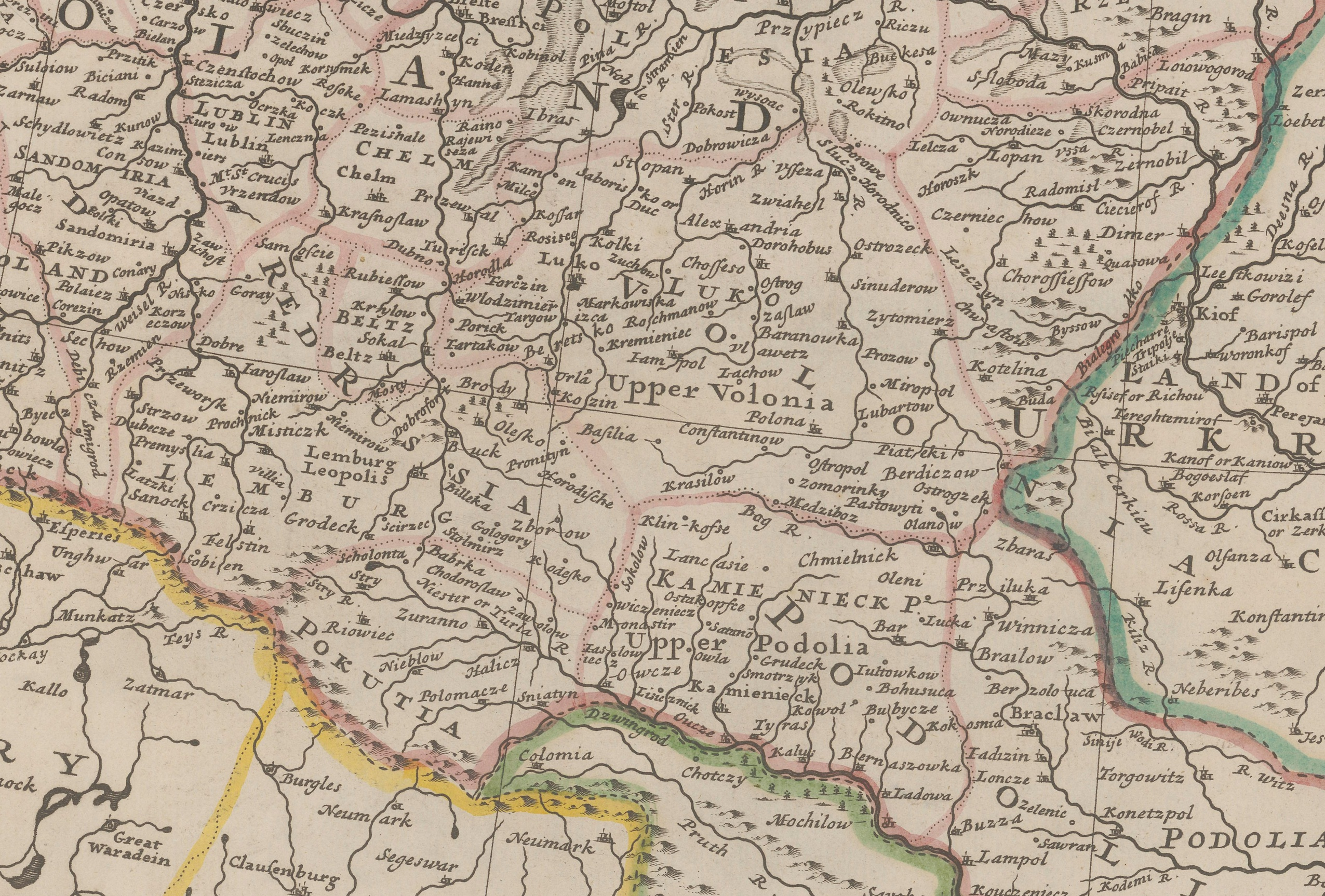
Galicia–Volhynia Lands in Polish-Lithuanian Commonwealth around 1700 (Map by Herman Moll)

Volhynia, which following the death of Lubart and deposition of his son Theodore was allocated by Jogaila to Vytautas, formally remained a principality of its own until the death of Svitrigaila in 1452, after which it became a province, and after 1566 the Volhynian Voivodeship of the Grand Duchy of Lithuania. That period saw the rise of powerful noble families, which increased their prestige during campaigns against Tatars: Ostrogski, Zbaraski, Czartoryski, Montowt, Sanguszko, Korecki, Hulevych (Hulewicz), Chodkiewicz, Chetvertynsky, Ruzhynsky and others.

== Economy and culture ==
"[In 1164] there was a great flood in Galič [;] the Dnestr River (...) overflowed as far as the Bykov Swamp. And more than three hundred men, who had come with salt from Udeč, drowned; and they took down many men from the trees and carts, which the water had swept away. [And their bread was very expensive] for that winter." – Kievan Chronicle, fol. 187r.

=== Agriculture ===
The economy of Galicia–Volhynia was predominantly a subsistence economy. It was based on agriculture, which was based on self-sufficient lands: the dvoryshche (Ukrainian: дворище). These were rural agricultural communities, owned and run by a group of related families (remnants of the earlier clan system), comparable to the zadrugas amongst the South Slavs. These economic units had their own arable land, hayfields, meadows, forests, foraging grounds and fish lakes. The main agricultural crops were oats and rye, less so wheat and barley. In addition, animal husbandry was developed, primarily horse breeding, as well as sheep breeding and pig breeding. Important components of the economy were foraging: animal hunting, honey hunting, and fishing.

=== Industry and crafts ===
Among the crafts of Galicia–Volhynia were blacksmithing, pottery, leatherworking, weaponsmithing, jewellery making, and casting. Since the Principality of Galicia–Volhynia was located in the Central European mixed forests – a forest and forest-steppe zone densely covered with forests – the construction and processing of wood became particularly developed. One of the leading industries of the principality was salt production. The Principality of Galicia–Volhynia, along with Crimea, was the only region that supplied salt to Kievan Rus' and Western European countries.

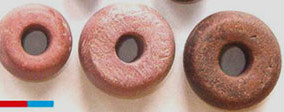
Ovruch slate spindle whorl

A particularly valuable commodity, produced in the Volhynian city of Ovruch in the 10th–13th centuries, was the reddish-coloured slate spindle whorl, carved out of pink and red slate stone (pyrophyllite slate), which was mined near the town of Ovruch in the territory of present-day Ukraine. Ovruch masters diligently repeated the most successful form of a clay spindle whorl - biconical (the weight as if consisted of two truncated cones connected by broad bases) The spindle whorl weighed on average about 16 g, the height was from 4 to 12 mm, the outer diameter was from 10 to 25 mm, the diameter of the hole for the spindle was 6–10 mm. If the spindle whorl turned out to be too narrow, it was wrapped with a thread so that it would not slip during rotation. Slate - soft stone; on the samples found by archaeologists, there are still scuffs from the threads. The production of slate spindles in Ovruch was designed for wide sales. The merchants who bought the consignment of the spindle whorls made a considerable way with them, sold them in different lands. Ovruch spindle whorls are found by archaeologists not only in the territories of Kievan Rus', but in other regions. Production of spindle whorls was designed for a wide sale. Ovruch's production and widespread sale of spindle whorls contributed significantly to the Galician–Volhynian economy. According to A. V. Artsikhovsky, "they are exactly the same in Kiev and Vladimir, in Novgorod and Ryazan, even in Cherson, in the Crimea and in the Bulgaria on the Volga." The Ovruch spindle whorls were so valued that the owners carved their personal tags on them, and after the spread of writing - carved their names. In the mid-13th century, the stone spindle whorls become clay again: the workshops of Ovruch were destroyed during the Mongol invasion of Kievan Rus'.

=== Commerce ===
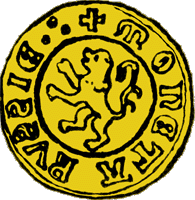
"Moneta Rvssie" coined in 1382 based on groschen

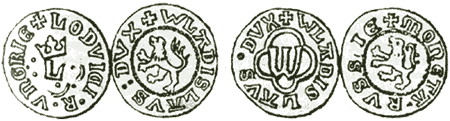
Coins of Dux Wladislaus

Both Volhynia and Galicia had experienced a remarkable economic development in the 12th century due to their commercial advantages. In part, this was because land trade routes in Asia Minor were severely disrupted due to the Byzantine–Seljuk wars (1046–1243), diverting numerous merchants coming from the east heading for Constantinople via Alexandria in Egypt, while others circumvented Anatolia via the port of Sudak (Sougdaia) in Crimea. The flourishing of the latter commercial hub soon attracted Kievan Rus' traders, who rerouted some of the would-be Byzantine goods (occasionally through itinerant Jewish merchants) to Poland, Hungary, Bohemia and Germany, via the towns of Volhynia and Galicia.

Their new status as transit hubs for commerce between the northern Black Sea ports and central Europe brought Galicia and Volodimer-in-Volhynia tremendous wealth and increasing political power in the late 12th century. Trade and salt mining in particular empowered the boyar class of Galicia, who were able to challenge and undermine the authority of the Rostislavichi princes. Galicia and Volhynia merged around 1198 or 1199 into the principality of Galicia–Volhynia. This happened when the local Galician branch of the Rostislavichi clan died out, and Roman Mstislavich of Volhynia also took possession of Galicia, establishing a dynastic union.

In 1240, during the Mongol invasion of Kievan Rus', the cities of Halych and Volodymyr were devastated by the Mongols. However, compared to other Rus' principalities, Galicia and Volhynia made a relatively quick economic recovery. In the early 1240s, Daniel of Galicia recovered Halych from Mikhail of Chernigov, and in the winter of 1245–1246 travelled to Sarai to submit himself to Batu Khan as a vassal in order to retain his patrimonial rights to Galicia–Volhynia. Henceforth, the Romanovichi of Ruthenia would have to pay tribute to the Golden Horde. The Mongol-Tatar military presence did give the region some defensive protection against Lithuanian, Polish and Hungarian incursions from the west. Moreover, Daniel managed to found new towns; to relocate his capital to the thriving city of Chełm, which became a vital cultural centre; construct new fortifications (torn down by Mongol orders in 1259 after the Kuremsa war); and to encourage commerce between east and west. The renewed Mongol-Tatar incursions of the mid-1280s disrupted the Ruthenian economy.

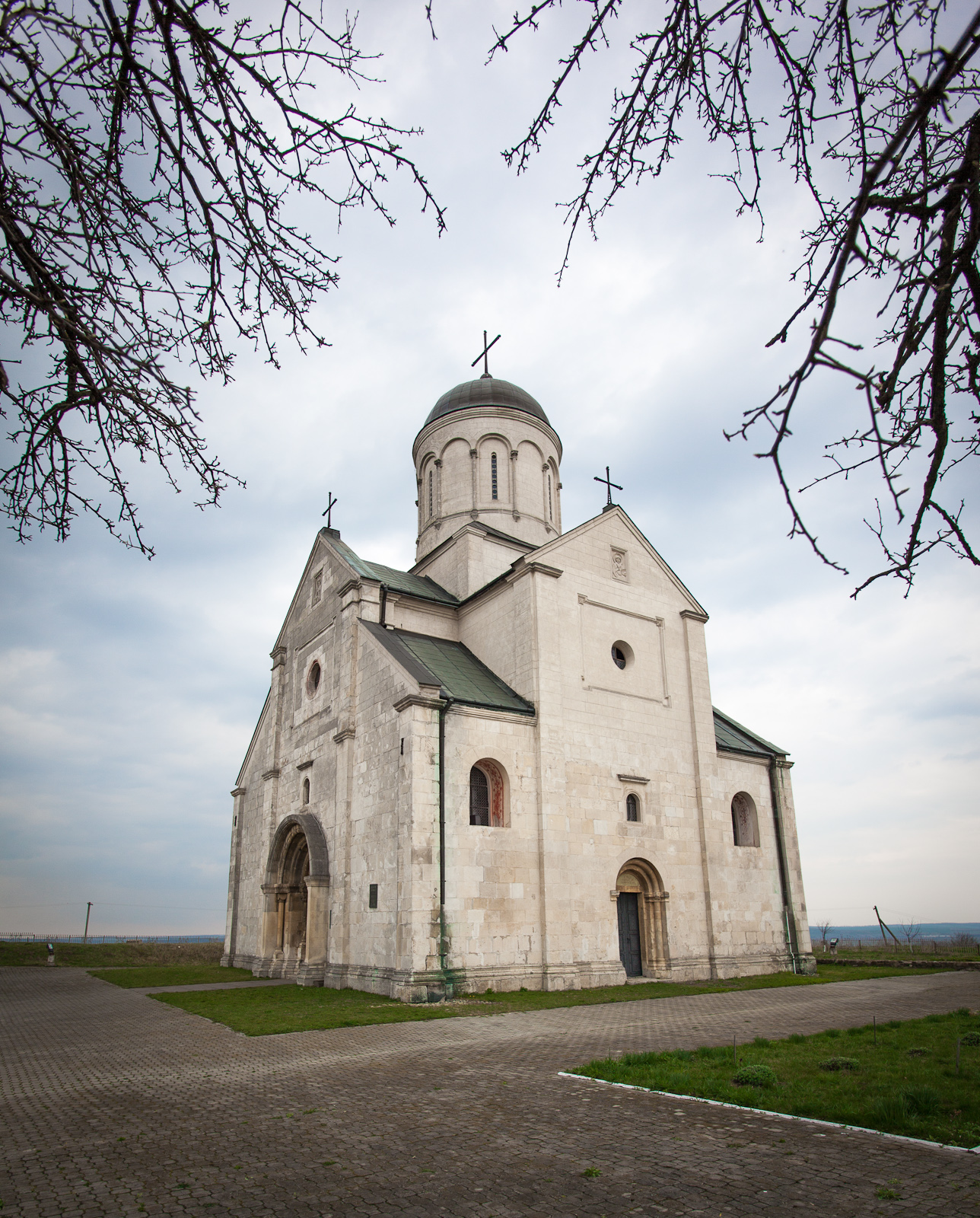
Saint Pantaleon Church, Shevchenkove, 1194

=== Architecture and literature ===
By the 12th century, construction of new buildings was taking place at a faster rate in the emerging urban centres of Galicia–Volynia (as well as in Smolensk and Suzdalia) than in the older centres of princely power of Kiev, Chernigov, and Pereyaslavl. Galicia–Volynia and the Novgorod Republic were also prominent examples of regions that began to establish their own Rus' chronicle traditions, still starting with the Primary Chronicle (PVL), but increasingly focusing on their own lands rather than the wider Kievan Rus' realm. The Kievan Chronicle was supplemented by the Galician–Volhynian Chronicle (GVC), and as such copied, redistributed, and preserved in codices such as the Hypatian Codex and the Khlebnikov Codex.

== Historical role ==
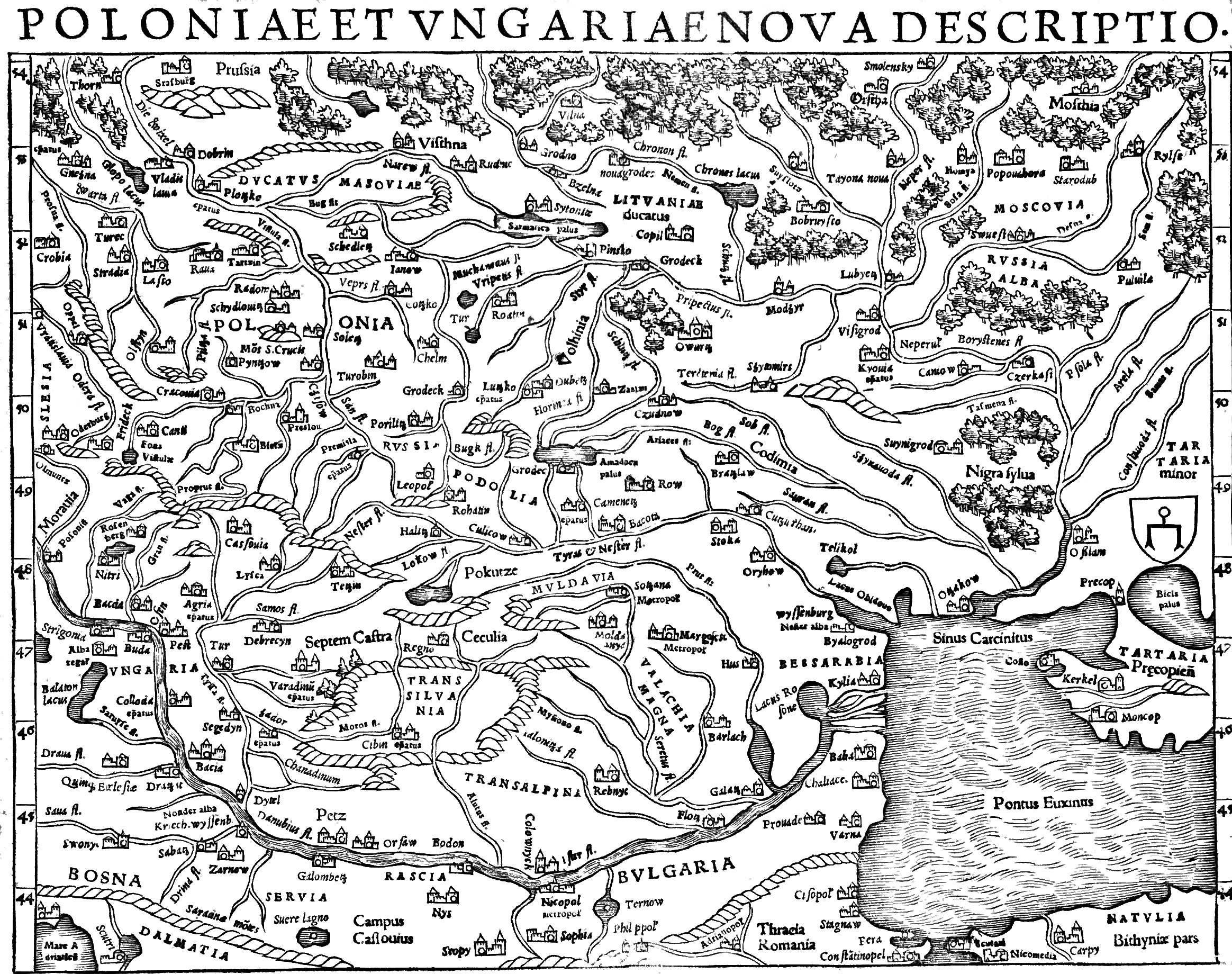
Sebastian Münster's 1554 map illustrates "Leopol" (Lviv) near Podolia as being in the centre of "Russia"

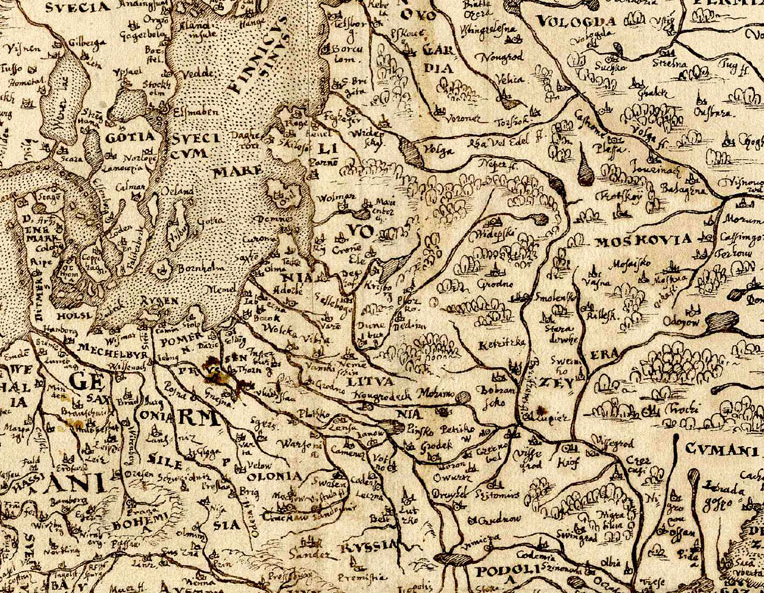
1570 map of Europe: "Russia" is shown around cities of Premislia (Przemyśl), Leopolis (Lviv), and Belz

The Galician-Volhynian Chronicle reflected the political programme of the Romanovich dynasty ruling Galicia–Volhynia. Galicia–Volhynia competed with other successor states of Kievan Rus' (notably Vladimir-Suzdal) to claim the Kievan inheritance. According to the Galician–Volhynian Chronicle, King Daniel was the last ruler of Kiev preceding the Mongolian invasion and thus Galicia–Volhynia's rulers were the only legitimate successors to the Kievan throne. Until the end of Galician-Volhynian state, its rulers advanced claims upon "all the land of Rus'." The seal of King Yuri I contained the Latin inscription domini georgi regis rusie.

In contrast to their consistent secular or political claims to the Kievan inheritance, Galicia's rulers were not concerned by religious succession. This differentiated them from their rivals in Vladimir-Suzdal, who sought to, and attained, control over the Kievan Church. Rather than contest Vladimir-Suzdal's dominance of the Kievan Church, the Ruthenian rulers merely asked for and obtained a separate Church from Byzantium.

Galicia–Volhynia also differed from the northern and eastern principalities of the former Kievan Rus' in terms of its relationship with its western neighbors. King Danylo was alternatively an ally or a rival with neighboring Slavic Poland and partially Slavic Hungary. According to historian George Vernadsky (1970), the kingdoms of Ruthenia, Poland and Hungary belonged to the same psychological and cultural world. The Roman Catholic Church was seen as a neighbor and there was much intermarriage between the princely houses of Galicia and those of neighboring Catholic countries. In contrast, the Westerners faced by Alexander, prince of Novgorod, were the Teutonic Knights, and the northeastern Rus experience of the West was that of hostile crusaders rather than peers.

In Ukrainian historiography, the Kingdom of Galicia–Volhynia is recognized to have played an important role, uniting under its rule large parts of the modern-day territory of Ukraine, continuing the political and cultural tradition of the Rus' state and functioning as the "shield" of Christian civilization following the decline of Kyiv.

The administrative divisions of Galicia–Volhynia were retained in the Polish-Lithuanian Commonwealth as the Volhynian Voivodeship, the Ruthenian Voivodeship (Red Ruthenia), Chelm Land, the Belz Voivodeship and Pokuttia.

== Administrative structure ==
Geographically, western Galicia–Volhynia extended between the rivers San and Wieprz in what is now south-eastern Poland, while its eastern territories covered the Pripet Marshes (now in Belarus) and the upper reaches of the Southern Bug river in modern-day Ukraine. During its history, Galicia-Volhynia was bordered by the Grand Duchy of Lithuania, the Principality of Turov-Pinsk, the Principality of Kiev, the Golden Horde, the Kingdom of Hungary, the Kingdom of Poland, Moldavia and the Monastic State of the Teutonic Knights.

The principality was divided into several appanage duchies and lands:

- Principality of Galicia
  - Principality of Peremyshl
  - Principality of Zvenyhorod
  - Principality of Terebovlia
- Principality of Volhynia
  - Principality of Lutsk
  - Principality of Dorohobuzh
  - Principality of Peresopnytsia
- Principality of Belz
- Land of Chełm (Lublin 1289–1302)
- Land of Berestia
- Black Ruthenia, a fief of Grand Duchy of Lithuania after a treaty between Daniel of Galicia and Vaišvilkas

Temporary divisions

- Principality of Kiev (Kyiv) (1230–1240)
- Principality of Turov (Turaŭ) (1230s)

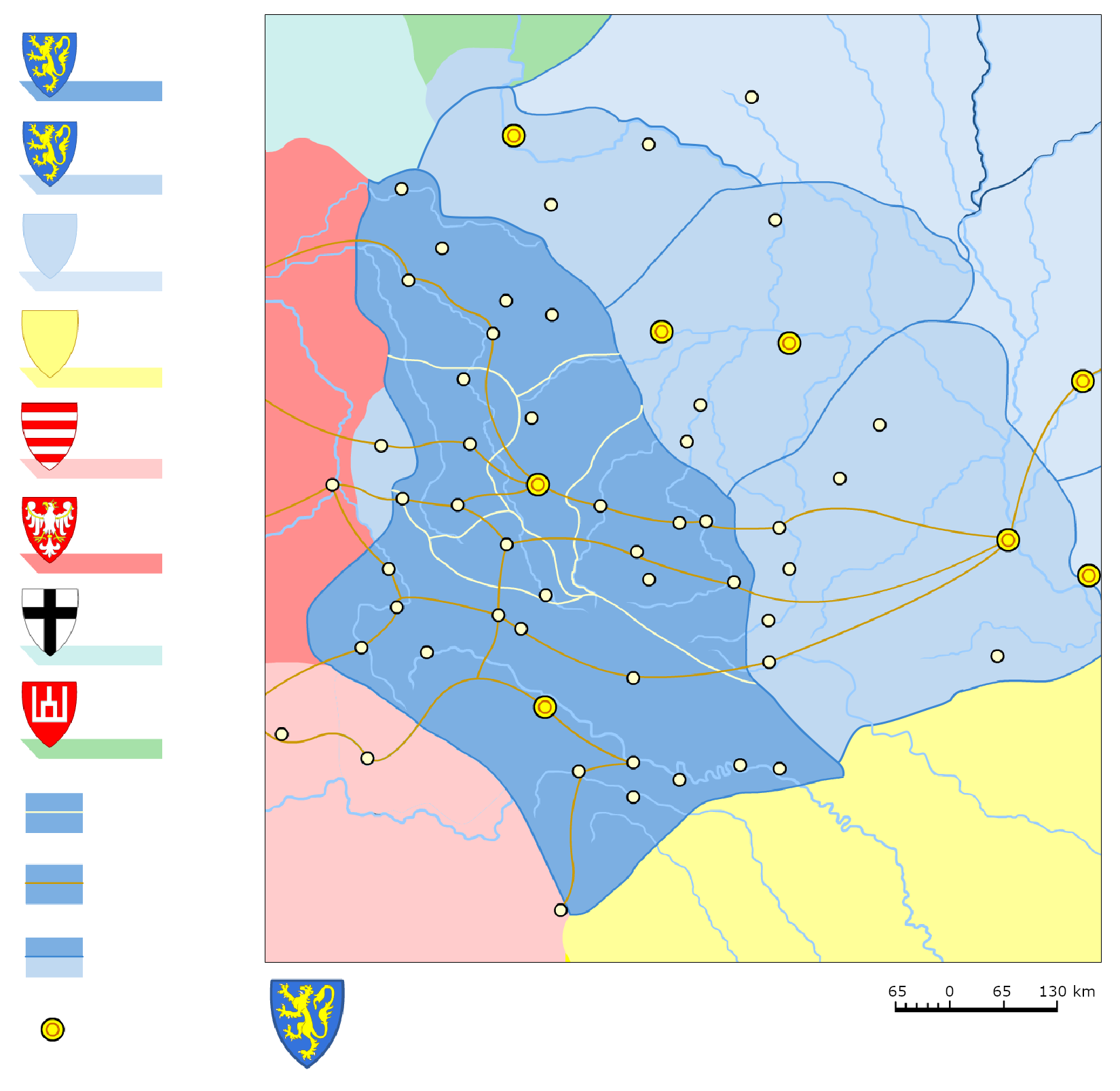

Coats of arms

Volhynia coat of arms

Galicia coat of arms

Peremyshl coat of arms

Belz coat of arms

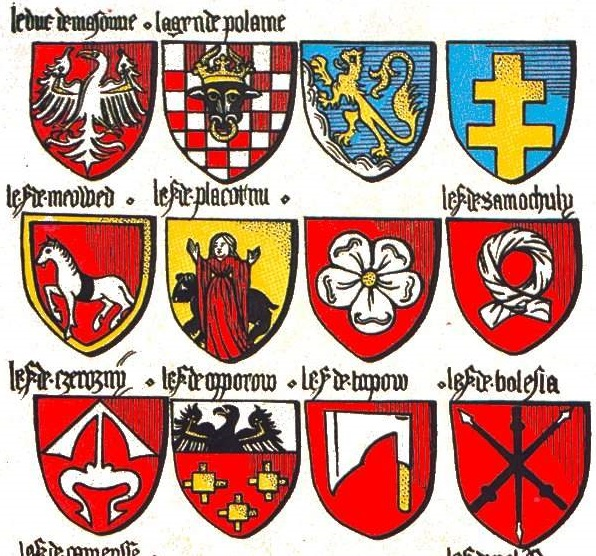
Coats of arms belonging to units from different lands of the Polish Crown which fought at the Battle of Grunwald, including the emblem of Lviv Land (2nd from right in upper row)

== Princes and kings ==
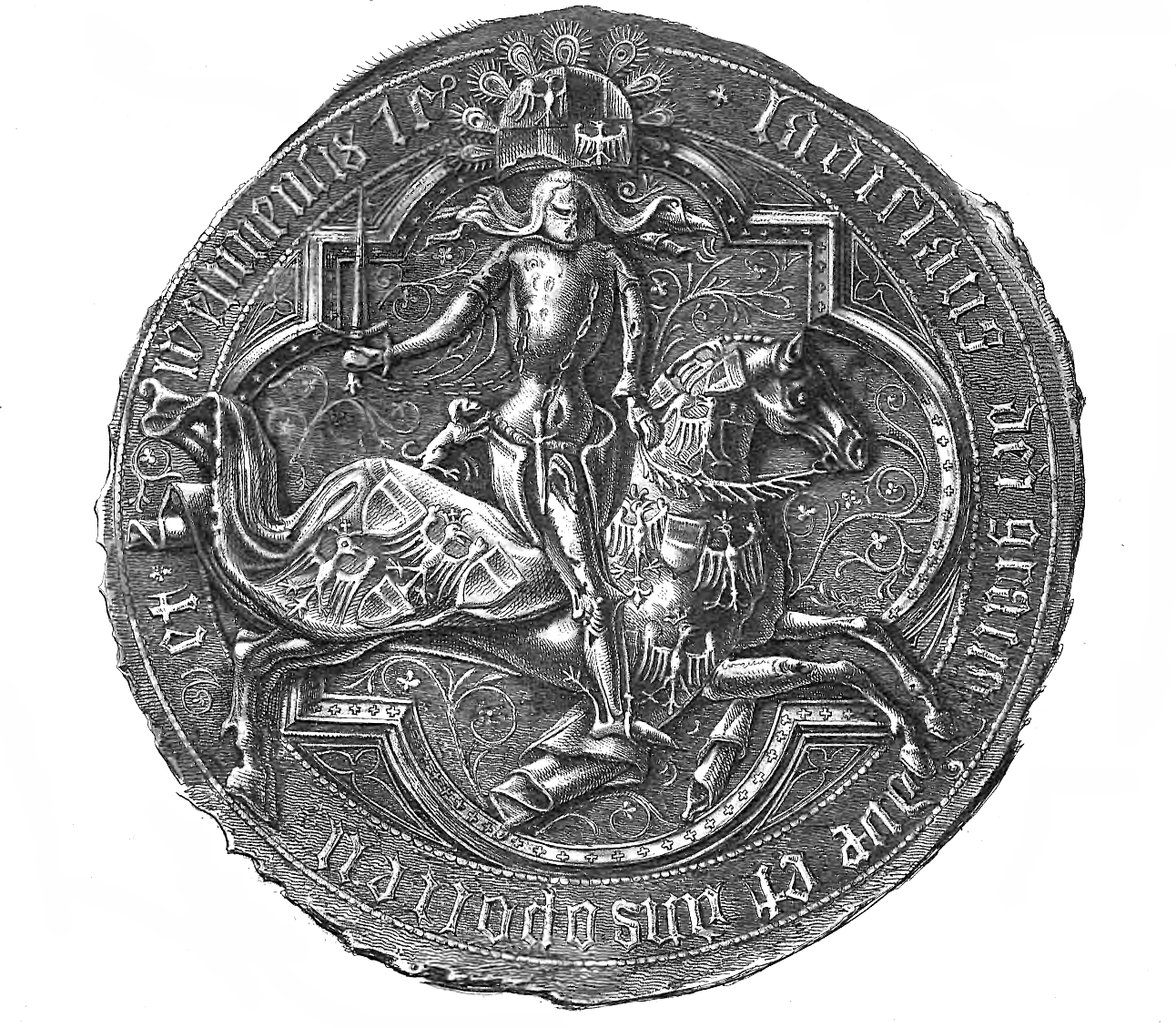
Prinz Władysław II Opolczyk Governor of Galicia 1372–1378

- 1199–1205 Roman the Great (in Volhynia since 1197, in Galicia since 1199)
- 1205–1214 political crisis
  - 1205–1206 Euphrosine Angelina (daughter of Isaac II Angelos) as a regent for Danylo/Daniel of Galicia
  - 1206–1212: the three sons of Ihor Svyatoslavych: Volodymyr Ihorevych, Svyatoslav Ihorevych, and Roman Ihorevych.
  - 1210 Rostislav II of Kiev (short stint)
  - 1211–1212 Mstislav the Mute as a regent for Danylo/Daniel of Galicia
  - 1212–1214 Uprising led by a boyar Volodyslav Kormylchych
- 1214–1232 Hungarian occupation, sons of Andrew II of Hungary
  - 1214–1220 Coloman, son of Andrew (King of Galicia and Lodomeria)
  - 1220–1221 Uprising led by Mstyslav the Able, who ruled in Galicia from 1221 to 1228
  - 1220–1232 Andrew, son of Andrew
- 1232–1235 Danylo/Daniel of Galicia
- 1235–1238 children of Michael of Chernigov
- 1238–1264 Danylo/Daniel of Galicia
- 1264–1269 Dual power descendants of Daniel
  - 1264–1269 Shvarn
  - 1264–1301 Lev I of Galicia
- 1301–1308 Yuri I of Galicia
- 1308–1323 Dual power descendants of Yuri
  - 1308–1323 Lev II of Galicia
  - 1308–1323 Andrew of Galicia
- 1323–1349 political crisis, de facto ruled by a boyar Dmytro Dedko
  - 1323–1323 Galicia: Volodymyr I Lvovych of Galicia, Volhynia: Liubartas
  - 1323–1340 Yuri II Boleslav (united as compromise)
  - 1340 takeover of Galicia by Casimir III the Great
  - 1341–1349 Liubartas
- 1349 Galicia annexed (patrimonial) by Poland and Hungary, Volhynia – Lithuania

Notes: The senior branch of Rurikid dynasty, in the 14th century Galician rulers came in close relations with Mazovian Piasts (Duke of Mazovia) and rising Gediminids which established the Grand Duchy of Lithuania.

== See also ==
- List of wars and battles involving Galicia–Volhynia
- Civil war in Greater Poland (1382–1385)
- Ruthenian nobility
- Metropolis of Halych

== Bibliography ==
- Plokhy, Serhii (December 1, 2015). The Gates of Europe: A History of Ukraine. ISBN 9780465050918.

=== Primary sources ===
- Galician–Volhynian Chronicle (c. 1292).
  - (in Ruthenian) Галицько-Волинський Літопис. Іпатіївський список (according to the Hypatian Codex; PSRL Vol. 2 1908) – Litopys.org.ua
  - (in Ruthenian) Галицько-Волинський Літопис. Острозький (Хлєбниковський) список (according to the Khlebnikov Codex; Harvard University Press 1990) – Litopys.org.ua
  - (in Ukrainian) Галицько-Волинський Літопис. Переклад Л.Махновця (in modern Ukrainian by Leonid Makhnovets, 1989) – Litopys.org.ua
  - (in English) Perfecky, George A. (1973). The Hypatian Codex Part Two: The Galician–Volynian Chronicle. An annotated translation by George A. Perfecky (PDF). Munich: Wilhelm Fink Verlag. OCLC 902306. (in modern English)
- Belarusian-Lithuanian Chronicles (c. 1420–1575)
  - (in Ruthenian) Литовсько-білоруські літописи
- List of Rus' Cities, Far and Near
  - (in Ruthenian) Список городів руських дальніх і близьких
- (in Ukrainian) Перелік джерел за "Крип'якевич І. Галицько-волинське князівство. Київ, 1984" (List of sources for ‘Krypyakevych I. Halych–Volyn principality. Kyiv, 1984)
- Ілюстрації з "Chronicon Pictum" Illustrations from the Chronicon Pictum.

=== Literature ===
- Katchanovski, Ivan; Kohut, Zenon E.; Nesebio, Bohdan Y.; Yurkevich, Myroslav (2013). Historical Dictionary of Ukraine. Lanham, Maryland; Toronto; Plymouth: Scarecrow Press. p. 992. ISBN 9780810878471.
- Jakubowski, A.; Miszczuk, A.; Kawałko, B.; Komornicki, T.; Szul, R. (2016). The EU's New Borderland: Cross-border relations and regional development. ISSN. Taylor & Francis. p. 272. ISBN 978-1-317-22431-0.
- Magocsi, Paul Robert (2010). A History of Ukraine: The Land and Its Peoples. Toronto: University of Toronto Press. p. 894. ISBN 9781442610217.
- Martin, Janet (2007). Medieval Russia: 980–1584. Second Edition. E-book. Cambridge: Cambridge University Press. ISBN 978-0-511-36800-4.
- Pelenski, Jaroslaw (1992). "The Contest for the "Kievan Inheritance" in Russian-Ukrainian Relations: The Origins and Early Ramifications" ( (PDF)). In Potichnyj, Peter J.; Pelenski, Jaroslaw; Raeff, Marc; Thekulin, Gleb (eds.). Ukraine and Russia in Their Historical Encounter. Proceedings of the First Conference on Russian-Ukrainian Relations, held in Hamilton, Canada, October 8–9, 1981) (PDF). Edmonton: CIUS Press, University of Alberta. pp. 3–19. ISBN 978-0-920862-84-1. Archived from the original on 27 February 2022.
- Subtelny, Orest (2000). Ukraine: A History. University of Toronto Press. ISBN 0-8020-8390-0.
- Vernadsky, George (1970). The Mongols and Russia. A History of Russia, Volume III. New Haven: Yale University Press.
