= Berladnici =

The Berladnici (Note: Polish: Berładnicy; Romanian: Berladnici; Russian: Берладники, romanized: Berladniki; Ukrainian: Берладники, romanized: Berladnyky.) were a supposed medieval people living along the northeastern Black Sea coast. While their ethnicity is unclear, it included runaways from Rus' who left those lands due to feudal oppression. Peasants as well as boyars dissatisfied with the rulers purportedly settled in the vicinity of the city of Bârlad as well as the river of the same name in eastern Romania, as well as on the lower Don River.

== History ==
The Berladnici are first mentioned in the Kievan Chronicle (part of the Hypatian Codex). The text recounts the 1159 war between Prince Yaroslav of Galicia and his cousin Ivan Berladnic, during which the latter fled "to the steppe to the Polovtsi" (Cumans):

...in the cities around the area of the Dunaj [Danube] River. He captured two ships and took many goods in them, and did harm to the Galician fishermen. And many Polovtsi came to him, and six thousand people of the area of Berlad [Берладника Berladnika] joined them.

In 1161, the Berladnici captured the port of Oleshia at the mouth of the Dnieper river, which caused severe damage to Rus' merchants. They were occupied mainly with fishing, hunting, and crafting. They practiced robbery, often working alongside Cumans in raids against the cities of Rus'. Berladnici nobility consisted of landowners and knyazes refugees who tried to create a state along the lower Danube.

According to Romanian history professor Victor Spinei (1982), written sources exclude the existence in the 12th-century of a Romanian territory subordinate to the Principality of Galicia. On the other hand Spinei contends that the archaeological evidence from that era does not reveal any typological or quantitative differences between the Bârlad area and the lands in the center and south of Moldova.

There is no mention of the Berladnici after the 13th century. The Galician–Volhynian Chronicle mentions a group of "Galician exiles" led by voivode Yuri Domazhyrych and boyar Volodymyr Derzhykray who come as allies of Kievan Rus' during the Battle of the Kalka River which some interpret to mean the Berladnici.

A small number of historians see in the Berladnici's libertine lifestyle a prototype of the Ukrainian Cossacks who developed in the 15th - 18th centuries.

== See also ==
- Ivan Berladnic
- Blakumen
- Bolokhoveni
- Brodnici
- Foundation of Moldavia
- Romania in the Early Middle Ages

== Bibliography ==
=== Primary sources ===
- Kievan Chronicle (c. 1200).
  - Old East Slavic original: Shakhmatov, Aleksey Aleksandrovich, ed. (1908). Ipat'evskaya letopis' Ипатьевская лѣтопись [The Hypatian Codex]. Complete Collection of Russian Chronicles (PSRL) (in Church Slavic and Russian). Vol. 2 (3rd ed.). Saint Petersburg: Typography of M. A. Aleksandrov / Izbornyk. pp. 285–715.
  - English translation: Heinrich, Lisa Lynn (1977). The Kievan Chronicle: A Translation and Commentary (PhD diss.). Nashville, Tennessee: Vanderbilt University. ProQuest 7812419
  - Ukrainian translation: Makhnovets, Leonid (1989). Літопис Руський за Іпатським списком [Rus' Chronicle according to the Hypatian Codex] (in Ukrainian). Kyiv: Dnipro. p. 591. ISBN 5-308-00052-2.
- Galician–Volhynian Chronicle (GVC; c. 1292).
  - Old East Slavic original: Shakhmatov, Aleksey Aleksandrovich, ed. (1908). Галицко-Волынскій сводъ [The Galician–Volhynian Codex]. Complete Collection of Russian Chronicles (PSRL) (in Church Slavic). Vol. 2 (3rd ed.). Saint Petersburg: Typography of M. A. Aleksandrov / Izbornyk. pp. 715–938. – critical edition.
  - 1973 English translation: Perfecky, George A. (1973). The Hypatian Codex Part Two: The Galician–Volynian Chronicle. An annotated translation by George A. Perfecky. Munich: Wilhelm Fink Verlag. OCLC 902306.
  - 1989 Ukrainian translation: Makhnovets, Leonid (1989). Літопис Руський за Іпатським списком : Галицько-Волинський літопис [Rus' Chronicle according to the Hypatian Codex : Galician–Volhynian Chronicle] (in Ukrainian). Kyiv: Dnipro. p. 591. ISBN 5-308-00052-2. — A modern annotated Ukrainian translation of the Galician–Volhynian Chronicle, based on the Hypatian Codex with comments from the Khlebnikov Codex.

=== Literature ===
- Boldur, Alexandru V. (1992). Istoria Basarabiei [History of Bessarabia] (in Romanian). Editura V. Frunza. ISBN 978-5-85886-027-3.
- Dimnik, Martin (1981). Mikhail, Prince of Chernigov and Grand Prince of Kiev, 1224–1246. Pontifical Institute of Mediaeval Studies. ISBN 0-88844-052-9.
- Spinei, Victor (1986). Moldavia in the 11th–14th Centuries. Editura Academiei Republicii Socialiste Româna.
- Spinei, Victor (2009). The Romanians and the Turkic Nomads North of the Danube Delta from the Tenth to the Mid-Thirteenth century. Koninklijke Brill NV. ISBN 978-90-04-17536-5.
