= Volodymyrko Volodarovych =

Galician prince

Volodymyrko Volodarovych (Ukrainian: Володимирко Володарович, romanized: Volodymyrko Volodarovych) or Vladimirko Volodarovich (Russian: Владимир Володаревич (Владимирко); 1104 – February 1153) was a Galician prince (from 1141, according to others from 1144), son of Volodar Rostyslavych.

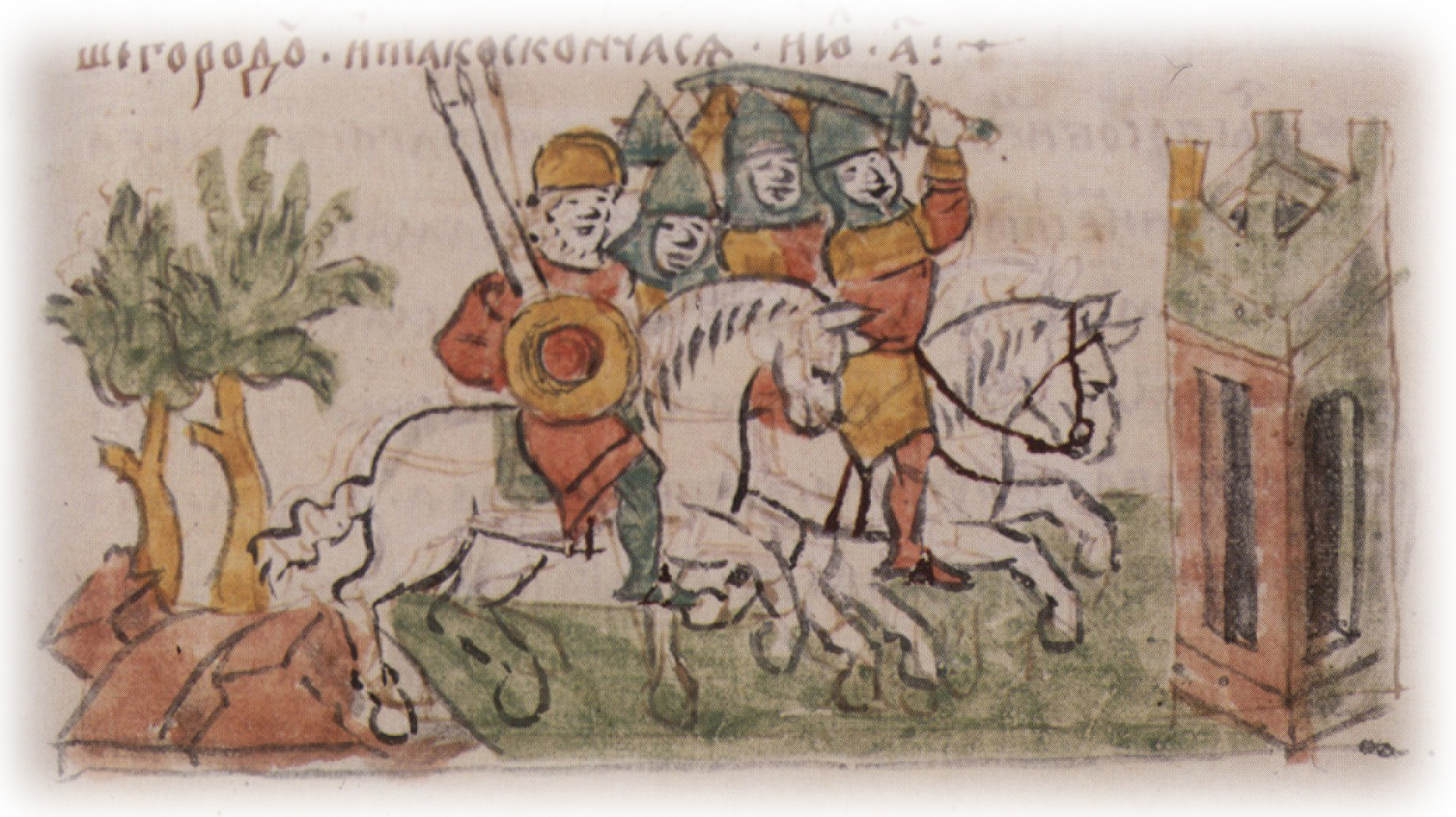
Vladimirko at the head of the cavalry, miniature from the Radziwiłł Chronicle (15th century)

== Reign ==
In 1124, Volodymyrko became the prince of Zvenyhorod and Belz. He failed to take Peremyshl from his brother Rostyslav in 1125–6. He took part in the battle of Wilichów.

After expelling his nephews, sons of Vasylko and Ruurik Rostislavich, Volodymyrko gradually brought together Peremyshl, Zvenyhorod, Halych and Terebovlia, uniting them into one Principality of Halych. The capital of the principality was established at Halych in 1141 (according to some sources, in 1144), after Vladimirko occupied it following the death of his nephew Ivan Berladnic.

He first failed to unite Halych with the Volyn principality, which was under the rule of Kievan prince Vsevolod II. However, thanks to the alliance with Yuri Dolgorukiy, he was able to defeat Kievan prince Izyaslav Mstislavich.

In alliance with the Byzantine emperor Manuel Comnenus, he led the long struggle against the Kingdom of Hungary, which ended only in 1152, when a peace treaty with the Hungarian king Géza was signed.

He had a son: Yaroslav Osmomysl, prince of Halych.

== Bibliography ==
- Hrushevsky, Michael (1970). History of Ukraine. Hamden: Archon Books. ISBN 0-208-00967-1.
- Dovhaniuk, Ivanna (2019). "Formation of Galicia-Volyn state and its historical significance". West Ukrainian National University.
- "Volodymyrko Volodarovych". Internet Encyclopedia of Ukraine. Canadian Institute of Ukrainian Studies. 2001. (originally appeared in the Encyclopedia of Ukraine, vol. 5 (1993).)
- Holovko, Oleksandr Borisovych (2006). "Князь Володимирко Володарович – Перший Володар Об'єднаного Галицького Князівства" [Prince Volodymyr Volodarovych – the First Ruler of the United Principality of Halych] (PDF). Україна: культурна спадщина, національна свідомість, державність (in Ukrainian). 15. Institute of Ukrainian Studies, Lviv: 90–97.

Regnal titles
Preceded by —	Prince of Halych; 1141 — 1153	Succeeded by Yaroslav Osmomysl
