= Principality of Peremyshl =

Medieval Ruthenian polity

Principality of Peremyshl Перемишльське князівство (Ukrainian) Peremyshlske kniazivstvo
- Principality of Kievan Rus'
- 11th century–13th century
- Flag Coat of arms
- Capital: Peremyshl
- Area
- 1,124 km^{2} (434 sq mi)
- History
  - Established: 11th century
  - Disestablished: 13th century
Preceded by	Succeeded by
Kievan Rus'	Principality of Galicia

The Principality of Peremyshl was a medieval principality centered on Peremyshl (Old East Slavic: Перемышль; now Przemyśl, Poland), and encompassing the Przemyśl Land, in the historical region of Red Rus' (Cherven land, or Red Ruthenia). It was one of several minor principalities within Halychyna (medieval Galicia), situated in the most western part of the region, and thus bordering the medieval Polish state. From the 11th and up to the 13th century, Peremyshl was ruled mostly by local princes from collateral branches of the Riurikid dynasty (ruling house of the Kievan Rus'), but on several occasions it also came under influence of neighboring Polish or Hungarian rulers. By the 14th century, the region came under firm Polish control.

== First mentioning ==
The Primary Chronicle, writing for the year 981, gives the first mention of Peremyshl relating the wars of Saint Vladimir:

Vladimir marched up the Lyachs and took their cities: Peremyshl, Cherven and other towns, all of which are subject to Rus even to this day.

It is possible that the Lyakhs here are the Poles. Cross argued that Lyakh was the early term for a Polish person. Franklin and Shepard argued that these people are the same as the Ledzanians, mentioned in the 10th century De Administrando Imperio as tributaries of the Rus. Peremyshl may have been one of the Cherven towns captured by the Polish prince Boleslaw I in 1018, towns recaptured by Rus in 1031.

== Dynasties ==
Peremyshl was ruled initially by the descendants of Vladimir Yaroslavich — who had helped recapture the towns of Cherven Rus in 1031 — and his only son Rostislav Vladimirovich; they are hence known as the Rostislavichi. The earliest known Prince of Peremyshl is Ryurik Rostislavich, who was occupying the city when the murderers of Yaropolk Izyaslavich fled to him in 1087. Vsevolod I Yaroslavich, Grand Prince, is alleged to have apportioned three south-western principalities, distributing Vladimir-in-Volhynia (modern Volodymyr-Volynskyi) to Davyd Igorevich, Terebovl to Vasilko Rostislavich and Peremyshl to Volodar Rostislavich, grants confirmed at the Council of Liubech of 1097. The city, defended by Prince Volodar, was besieged in 1097 by Yaroslav Svyatopolkovich, allied to King Coloman of Hungary. However Davyd Svyatoslavich, Prince of Chernigov, and his Polovtsy ally Bonyak defeated the Hungarian.

In 1141, it was united with the Principality of Terebovlia and Principality of Zvenyhorod to form the enlarged Principality of Halych, but was later on several occasions awarded to or seized by various members of the ruling dynasty. Peremyshl was often affected by frequent dynastic struggles in the Principality of Halych, and the neighboring Principality of Volhynia, particularly during the first half of the 13th century, when both Polish and Hungarian rulers also tried to expand their influences over the region. Thus in the autumn of 1219, Peremyshl was captured by Polish forces during the combined Polish-Hungarian campaign aimed at securing the entire Halychyna for the Hungarian prince Coloman, who was styled as King of Galicia. In 1224, Coloman's brother, prince Andrew of Hungary, became the Prince of Peremyshl, and in 1227 also the Prince of Halych.

During the conflict between Rostislav Mikhailovich and Daniil Romanovich (formerly its prince), it was one of the former's strongholds; its bishop supported Rostislav, and when Rostislav occupied Halych, he appointed Konstantin of Ryazan to oversee Peremyshl. Peremyshl is known to have been the main fort of Boleslaw-Yuri, King of Rus, going into Polish hands after his death.

== See also ==
- Przemyśl Land
- Red Ruthenia
- Lesser Poland

== Sources ==
=== Primary sources ===
- Cross, Samuel H.; Sherbowitz-Wetzor, Olgerd P. (1953) [1930]. The Russian Primary Chronicle: Laurentian Text (PDF) (2nd rev. ed.). Cambridge, MA: The Mediaeval Academy of America. Archived from the original on 2025-11-02.
- Perfecky, George A. (1973). The Galician-Volynian Chronicle. München: Wilhelm Fink Verlag.

=== Secondary sources ===
- Borev, Igor; Tuhanidi, Alexander (2000), "Lords of Peremyshl and Galich" (XPOHOC)
- Dimnik, Martin (2003). The Dynasty of Chernigov, 1146-1246. New York: Cambridge University Press.
- Font, Márta; Barabás, Gábor (2019). Coloman, King of Galicia and Duke of Slavonia (1208-1241): Medieval Central Europe and Hungarian Power. Leeds: Arc Humanities Press.
- Franklin, Simon; Shepard, Jonathan (1996), The Emergence of Rus, 750-1200, Longman History of Russia, London & New York: Longman, ISBN 0-582-49091-X
- Martin, Janet (1995), Medieval Russia, 970-1584, Cambridge Medieval Textbooks, Cambridge: Cambridge University Press, ISBN 0-521-36832-4
- Rowell, S. C. (1994), Lithuania Ascending: A Pagan Empire Within East-Central Europe, 1295-1345, Cambridge Studies in Medieval Life and Thought: Fourth Series, Cambridge University Press, ISBN 978-0-521-45011-9
- Rumyantsev, Vyacheslav, ed. (2000), "Principality of Peremyshl (1085 - 1269)" (XPOHOC)
