= Volodar of Peremyshl =

- Prince of Peremyshl'
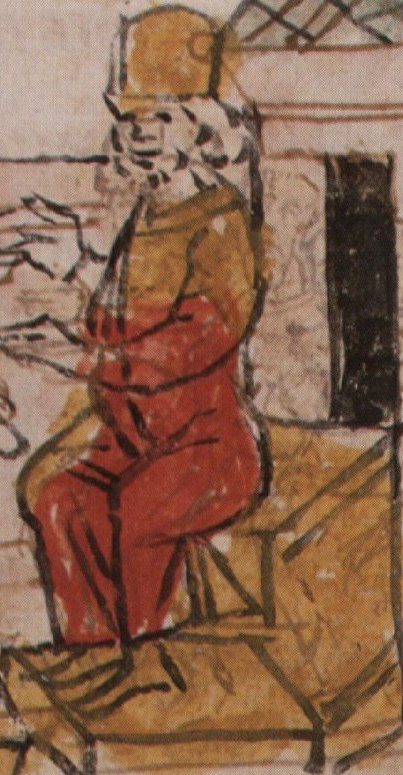
- The ruler on the throne, miniature from the Radziwiłł Chronicle (15th century)
- Reign: 1092–1124
- Died: 19 March 1124
- Issue: Vladimirko Volodarovich; Rostislav Volodarovich; Irina Volodarovych a daughter
Names
- Volodar Rostislavovich
- House: Rurik
- Father: Rostislav Vladimirovich
- Mother: Anna Lanke

Volodar Rostislavich (Ukrainian: Володар Ростиславич, romanized: Volodar Rostyslavych; Russian: Володарь Ростиславич; died 1124) was Prince of Zvenyhorod (1085–1092) and Peremyshl' (1092–1097).

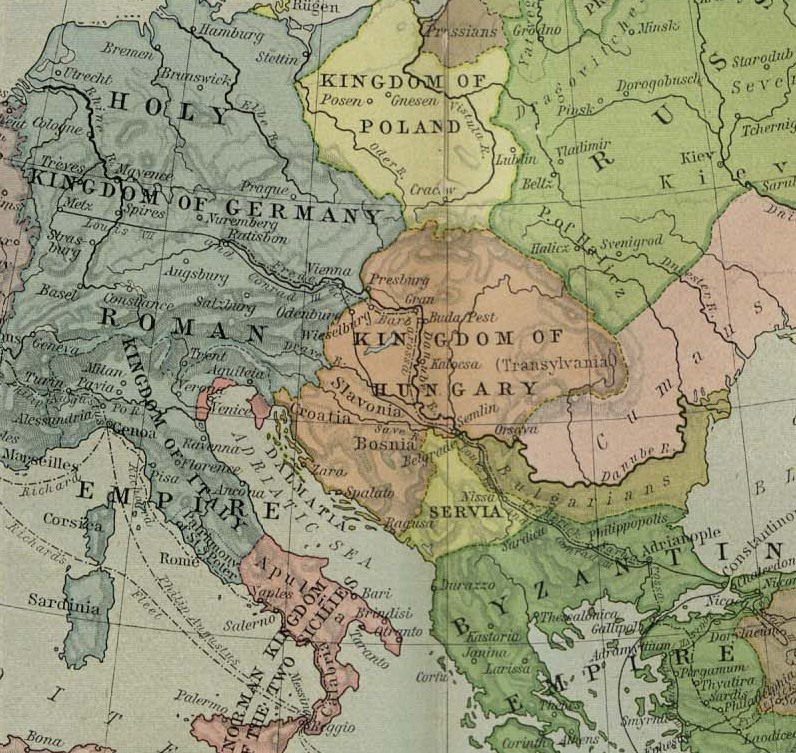
Zvenyhorod depicted on the map (of 1190) as Svenigrod in P. of Halicz (light green).

He actively was involved in the Polish internal affairs. Volodar also waged a war against the grand prince of Kiev, Sviatopolk II of Kiev and his son Yaroslav. In 1121 Volodar was imprisoned in Poland, but was bonded out by his brother Vasilko Rostislavich.

Together with Vasilko, he participated at the federal council in Liubech in 1097 (see Council of Liubech).

His father was Rostislav of Tmutarakan; his son was Vladimirko of Halych, father of Yaroslav Osmomysl.

== Legacy ==
Today there is confusion between two localities of former Zvenyhorod city, one being located in Lviv Raion in Lviv Oblast and another in Chortkiv Raion in Ternopil Oblast. The map on the left shows one east of Halych (pol. Halicz), which is one in the Ternopil Oblast, while the official Ukrainian historiography claims the one near Lviv, which would be located north of Halych.

== Military campaigns ==
- against Kiev in 1099 (near Zolochiv)
- against Hungary in 1099 (near Peremyshl)

Regnal titles
| Preceded by Riurik Rostislavovich | Prince of Peremyshl; 1092–1124 | Succeeded by Rostislav Volodarovich |
| Preceded by position created | Prince of Zvenyhorod; 1084–1124 | Succeeded by Volodymyrko Volodarovych |
