= Principality of Zvenyhorod =

Late medieval state in eastern Europe

The Principality of Zvenyhorod was a historical state which existed in the 11th–13th centuries in the west of modern Ukraine with the capital in Zvenyhorod. In January 1350, Principality became part of Polish Kingdom.

== History ==
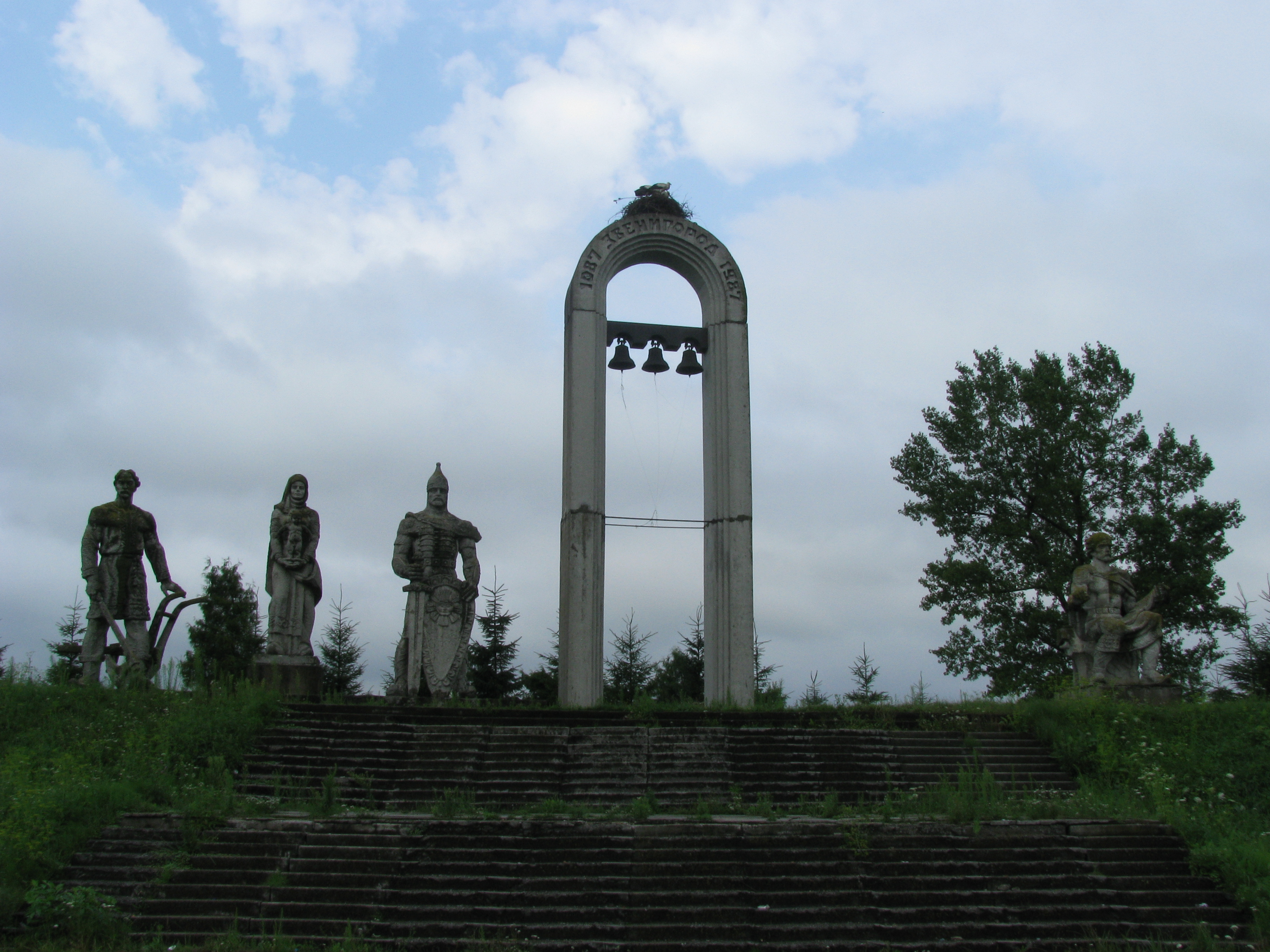
Monument to 900 years of Zvenyhorod (1987), celebrating that "Zvenyhorod" was first mentioned in a written source in 1087

Around the year of 1084, the principalities of Zvenyhorod, Terebovlia and Peremyshl were founded within the Principality of Volhynia. Zvenyhorod went to Volodar Rostyslavych, the others to his brothers.

In 1141 the principality united with Peremyshl and Terebovlia.

In 1239 the area was subordinated to the Golden Horde. But January 1350 the principality went under control of Kingdom of Poland, then became part of it in 1392.

== See also ==
- List of princes of Galicia and Volhynia
