= Oleshky Sich =

Coordinates: 46°37′51″N 32°45′31″E

Oleshky Sich Олешківська Січ
- 1711–1728
- Flag Coat of arms
- Status: Cossack Host
- Common languages: Middle Ukrainian
- Religion: Orthodox Christianity
- Government: Republic
- Kish otaman
- History
  - Foundation: 1711
  - Transfer: 1728
- Currency: All European currencies
Preceded by	Succeeded by
Kamianka Sich	Nova Sich

Immovable Monument of National Significance of Ukraine
- Official name: Олешківська Січ (Oleshky Sich)
- Type: Archaeology, History
- Reference no.: 210032-Н

The Oleshky Sich (Ukrainian: Олешківська Січ, romanized: Oleshkivska Sich) was a territorial-military organisation of the Zaporizhian Cossacks of Ukraine in the lower reaches on the left bank of the Dnipro within the territories of the Crimean Khanate. The land on which the Sich was built was granted by Khan Devlet II Giray at the request of the kish otaman Kost Hordiienko.

It was founded in 1711 following the destruction of the Chortomlyk Sich by the tsarist army in 1709. The Oleshky Sich existed until 1728.

== Site ==
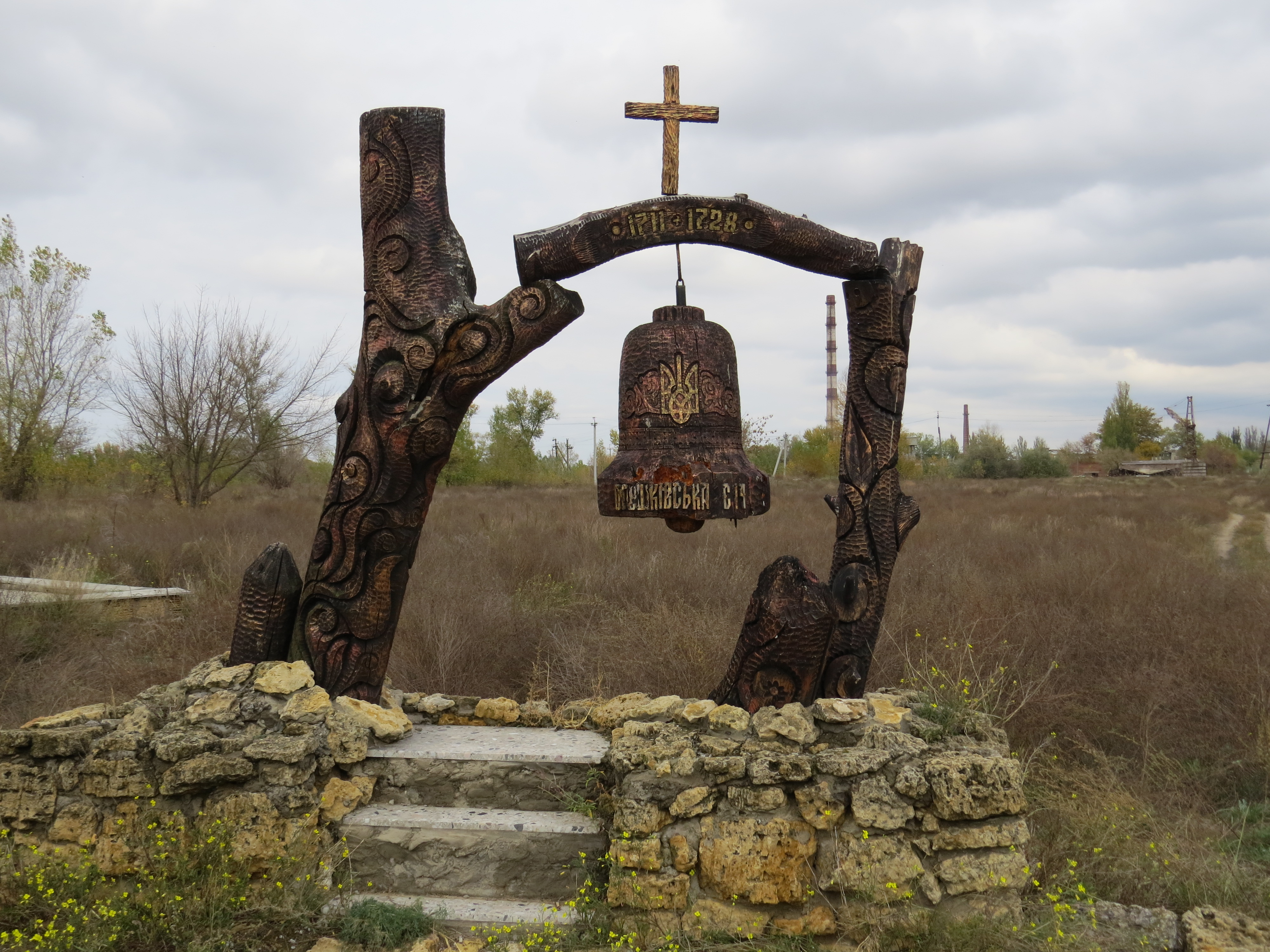
Monuments at the site of the Oleshky Sich

The Sich Fortress was situated in the Oleshky area, opposite the modern city of Kherson. Initially, the territory of the Oleshky Sich was small; from 1712, following the defeat of the Muscovite Tsardom in the war with the Ottoman Empire, the Zaporizhian Cossacks’ holdings extended northwards to the rivers Oril and Samara. From this Sich, the Cossacks temporarily relocated to the site of the former Kamianka Sich, but later returned.

The Sich was a regular quadrangle with moats and ramparts 1.5 metres high, with redoubts at the corners and a gate on the northern side. In the centre stood semi-underground huts (these were excavated by archaeologists between 1990 and 2003). To the west of the settlement stood the Church of the Intercession of the Most Holy Mother of God, built of reeds.

The site of the Oleshky Sich was listed as an archaeological and historic monument of national significance on 14 September 2009.

== History ==
=== Medieval Oleshia ===
The Oleshky Sich was founded in the Taurida Governorate, in the Dnipro Povit, almost directly opposite the provincial capital of Kherson, which lies on the right bank of the Dnipro. Having arisen some distance south of the site of the Ancient Greek colony of Pontic Olbia, the town of Oleshia is first mentioned in the Primary Chronicle (PVL) in 1084 as the place where the exiled prince David Igorevich pillaged traders that were heading for Greece (the Byzantine Empire).

Въ сеже лѣто Давыдъ зая грьчьникы въ Ольшии, и зая въ нихъ вьсе имѣние.
("In the same year, David captured the merchants going to Greece in [the city of] Oleshia, and took all their property.")

During the Mongol invasion of Kievan Rus', Oleshia is last mentioned sub anno 6732 (1224) in the Novgorod First Chronicle, during its narration of the Battle of Oleshia and the Battle of the Kalka River.

Oleshia would later become a Genoese colony named Illice, Ylice, or Elice (or, alternatively, the colony was founded nearby). until its destruction by the Turks in 15th century. Illice's fall was further accelerated by the Lithuanian expansion along the Dnieper, with the city fully disappearing by 1455. The town is not attested anymore until the appearance of the Oleshky Sich in around the same area in the early 18th century.

=== Formation ===
The Oleshky Sich was formed in 1711 by some 6,000 Cossacks under the guidance of Otaman Ya. Bogush. At that time, Oleshky belonged to the Crimean Khan, and, due to his vassalage to the Ottoman Empire, to the Ottoman Sultan as well. It was here that the Zaporizhian Cossacks went after the Kamianka Sich had been destroyed by the Muscovite troops.

The presence of a Zaporizhian Sich in Oleshky is attested to by the 18th-century historian Prince Semen Myshetsky:

"Whilst under the rule of the Crimean Tatars, the Zaporizhian Cossacks lived in their two Sich settlements, namely in Kamianka and in Oleshky." (Note: «Перебуваючи під кримчаками, запорізькі козаки жили у двох своїх Січах, а саме в Кам'янці і в Олешках».)

Another attestation is found in the description of the lands dating from 1774, following the Treaty of Kuchuk-Kainarji between the Russian Empire and the Ottoman Empire under Empress Catherine II:

"Aleshki, the site of the former Zaporizhian Sich, where the Zaporizhian Cossacks lived whilst the Tatars were around, lies on the banks of the Konska River; here, during the current war, a storehouse surrounded by entrenchments was maintained, and for the winter quartering of troops in 1773, a considerable number of dugouts were built nearby, where two regiments were comfortably accommodated, and through them Kinburn was held under siege." (Note: «Алешки, место прежде бывшей запорожской Сечи, когда за татарами запорожцы жили, лежит по берегу речки Конской; тут в нынешнюю войну содержан был обнесеными ретраншементом магазин, да и для зимнего пребывания войск в 1773 году довольное число около ево землянок выстроено, где два полка без нужды помещены были, и ими Кинбурн в блокаде обдержан был».)

=== Conflicts with the Crimean Khanate ===
Initially, the Crimean Khan Devlet II Giray was quite mild and welcoming to the Cossacks at Oleshky. However, the treatment of the Oleshky Cossacks became increasingly strict over time, until they had no right to build military fortifications or possess cannons, which left them vulnerable to attacks by the Crimean Khanate. Eventually they were also banned from constructing an Orthodox church building. In time, they were subjected to paying tribute to the Khan, and forced labour, such as on the Perekop Wall, as well as participating in Crimean Tatar raids on Ukrainian and Muscovite lands.

=== Emigration from the Oleshky Sich ===
In 1714, some 3,500 Cossacks left the Oleshky Sich behind and travelled of their own accord to Left-Bank Ukraine, where they settled near Hlukhiv and Konotop.

It was only the socio-political changes of the late 1720s (the accession of Peter II, the election of D. Apostol as hetman and I. Husak as kish otaman, and so on) which enabled the Cossacks, together with their property and livestock, to return to the site of the Old (Chortomlyk) Sich, at the mouth of the Chortomlyk River.

=== 1728 sack ===
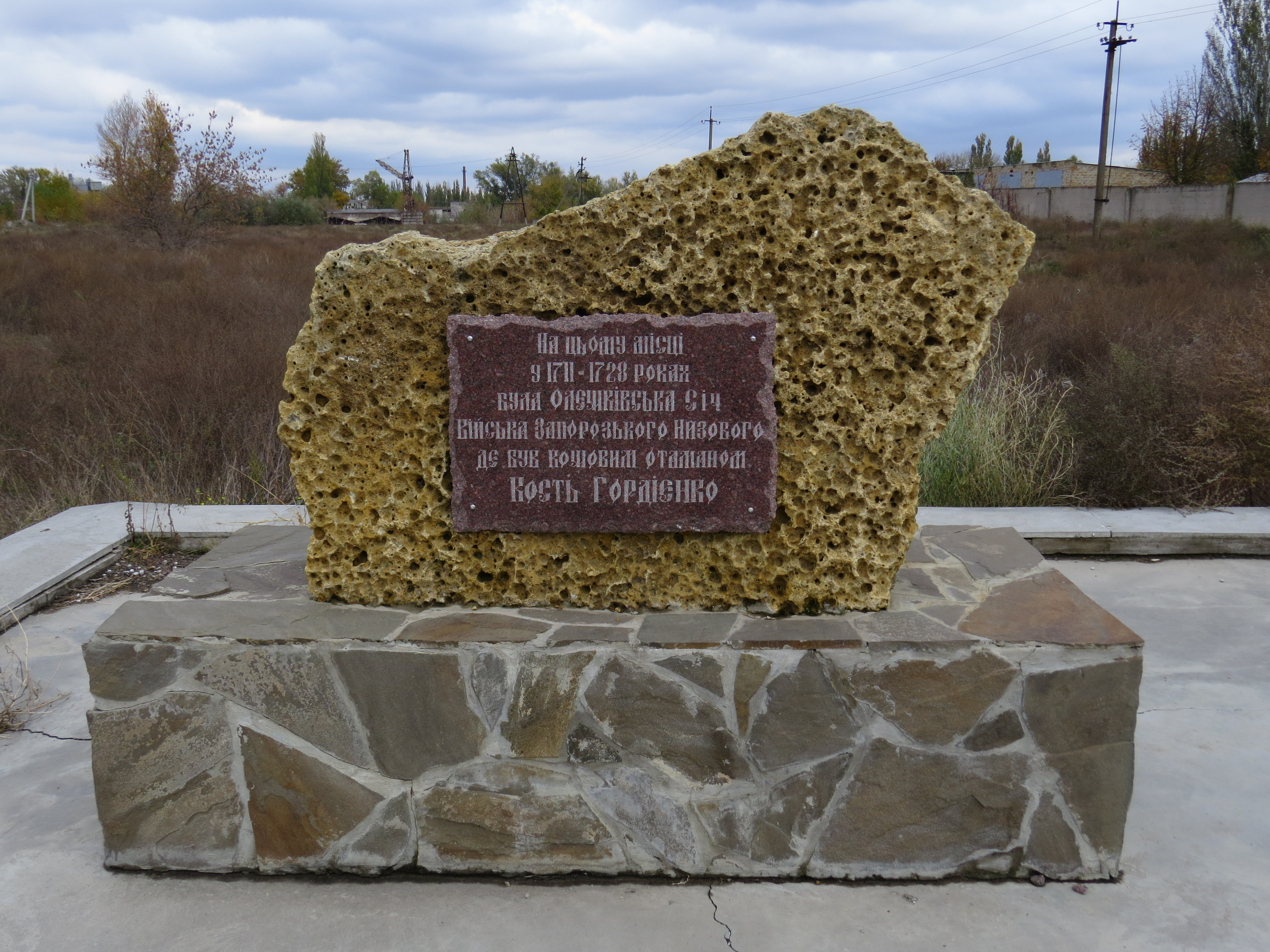
A commemorative stone in honour of Kost Hordiienko

In May 1728, a pro-Muscovite uprising broke out amongst the Cossacks of the Samara River, led by Ivan Husak. The Samara Cossacks attacked the Oleshky Sich, shackled the pro-Ivan Mazepa kish otaman Kost Hordiienko, plundered and raised the Oleshky Sich, and abducted its remaining inhabitants to the Chortomlyk Sich. There, they waited in vain for two years for the tsar of Moscow to accept them as subjects of the Russian Empire. Not receiving a positive response, in the spring of 1730, the Zaporizhian Cossacks resettled from the Chortomlyk Sich back to the Kamianka Sich on the Kamianka River, and once more subjected themselves to the protection of the Crimean Khan.

According to another version, some Oleshky Cossacks were absent when the Samara Cossacks attacked; these other Oleshky Cossacks later counter-attacked the Samara Cossacks and retrieved the stolen regalia and booty, but revived the Kamianka Sich rather than rebuilding the Oleshky Sich.

== Bibliography ==
=== Primary sources ===
- Ostrowski, Donald; Birnbaum, David J. (7 December 2014). "Rus' primary chronicle critical edition – Interlinear line-level collation". pvl.obdurodon.org (in Church Slavic). Archived from the original on 28 April 2025.

=== Literature ===
- Berest, Dan (2008). "Місце і час кожної Запорозької Січі. Дніпровські пороги. Картографія - мапи" [The location and date of each Zaporizhian Sich. The Dnipro Rapids. Cartography – maps]. Витоки Козацтва [The Origins of the Cossacks] (in Ukrainian). Vinnytsia: Knyha-Veha. p. 66.
- Hurzhiy, Oleksandr Ivanovych (2010). "Олешківська Січ" [Oleshkivska Sich]. Encyclopedia of History of Ukraine (in Ukrainian). Vol. 7. Kyiv: Institute of History of Ukraine. p. 584. Archived from the original on 23 June 2026.
- Kokin Yu., Олешківська Січ (Oleshky Sich) // Small Dictionary of Ukrainian History / edited by Valeriy Smoliy. Kyiv: Lybidj, 1997. 464 pp. ISBN 5-325-00781-5.
- Hurzhiy, Oleksandr Ivanovych (1998). Олешківська Січ (1711—1728 рр.) [Oleshky Sich (1711–1728)]. Козацькі січі (нариси з історії українського козацтва XVI–XIX ст.) / Valeriy Smoliy (editor-in-chief), V. Shcherbak (scientific editor), Taras Chukhlib (comp.), Oleksandr Ivanovych Hurzhiy, V. Matyakh, Arnold Leonidovych Sokulskyi, Valeriy Stepanovych Stepanov. Kyiv; Zaporizhzhia: Institute of History of Ukraine, National Academy of Sciences of Ukraine; Scientific Research Institute of the Cossacks. pp. 132–148.
- Shcherbak, Vitaliy Oleksiyovych (2005). "Запорозька Січ" [Zaporozka Sich]. Encyclopedia of History of Ukraine (in Ukrainian). Vol. 3. Kyiv: Institute of History of Ukraine. p. 270–275. Archived from the original on 24 June 2026.
- Stebelsky, Ihor (2026). "Oleshky Sich". Encyclopedia of Ukraine. Canadian Institute of Ukrainian Studies.
- Yavornytsky, Dmytro Ivanovych (1993) [1897]. Історія запорозьких козаків. Том 3 (1686–1734) [History of the Zaporizhian Cossacks. Volume 3 (1686–1734)] (PDF) (in Ukrainian). Kyiv: Naukova Dumka. p. 588. ISBN 5-12-002052-6. (history until 1734)
