= Oleshia =

Former settlement and historic area on the lower Dnieper

Possible locations of Oleshia (with significant and insignificant archaeological findings of the Kievan Rus' period):
1 Adzhyhol-1 settlement
2 Dniprovske-2 hillfort
3 Velykyi Potomkin Island settlement
4 Oleshky City

Oleshia or Oleshye (Note: Old East Slavic: Ѡлешье, Олешіе, romanized: Oleshĭe. Ukrainian: Олешшя, romanized: Oleshshja. Russian: Олешье, romanized: Olesh'e.) is the name of a former settlement and a historic area on the lower Dnieper. During its existence, the port settlement was controlled by Kievan Rus', and was an important center of fishing and trade due to its location on the route from the Varangians to the Greeks. In May 1223, the Rus' princes Danylo and Mstislav defeated the Mongols during Battle of Oleshia.

== Location ==
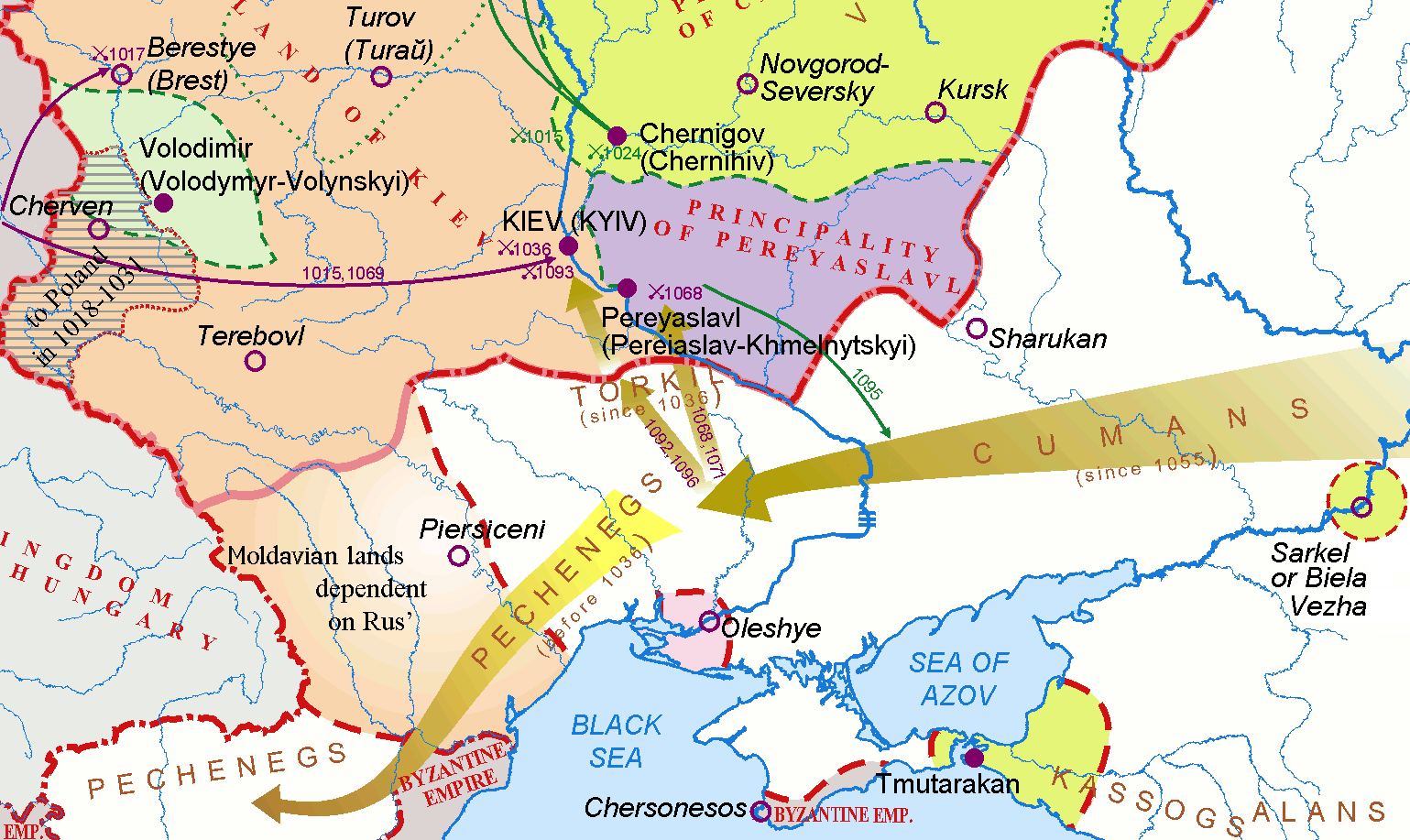
This map attempts to reconstruct the 11th century. Oleshia (Oleshye) is shown on the Dnieper River downstream from modern Kherson. Some researchers believe that Oleshia was located further west, at the confluence of the Dnieper–Bug estuary.

There are two possible locations of Oleshia: Velykyi Potomkin Island in the Dnieper Delta, and the settlement Adzhyhol-1 with the Dniprovske-2 hillfort on the Dnieper–Bug estuary. There are Kievan Rus'-era archaeological finds in both sites. At any rate, it is not to be identified with Pontic Olbia, an archaeological site of an ancient Greek port city further to the north on the Southern Bug.

Archaeological evidence suggests that both of the likely locations were founded no later than in 11th century, which happened as the result of the development of the trade route along the Dnieper. A 12th-century map by Muhammad al-Idrisi shows a settlement on an island in the Dnieper Delta named Mulisa connected to Kiev and Chersonesus by trade routes. In combination with its strategion position, this may make the Velykyi Potomkin Island settlement a more likely candidate for the location of Oleshia, although direct evidence is lacking. The archaeological findings from the island include metal objects (nails, knives, weapons, fishing hooks) and ceramics (bricks, tiles, amphorae). Of interest is a branded pot from Verkhnii Saltiv, which may point to the presence of Alans in the settlement. Remains of wooden ships were found underwater by the island. The Kherson Local History Museum exhibited the artifacts from the Velykyi Potomkin Island.

=== Oleshia and Oleshky ===
Whether there is a direct connection between the medieval Oleshia and the modern Oleshky is subject to debate among scholars. It was traditionally believed that Oleshia was located in or near the city of Oleshky, but nowadays the idea is unpopular due to a lack of evidence. While the land where Oleshky currently stands may have been used by the Rus', the main settlement was likely located in a different place. The name of Oleshky was likely consolidated by the Oleshky Sich that existed from 1711 to 1728.

== History ==
Although the city was surrounded by Cuman-controlled lands, there are no records of Oleshia being under their attack. However, it was the site of numerous disputes among Rus' princes.

Oleshia is first mentioned in the Primary Chronicle (PVL) in 1084 as the place where the exiled prince David Igorevich pillaged traders that were heading for Greece (the Byzantine Empire).

Въ сеже лѣто Давыдъ зая грьчьникы въ Ольшии, и зая въ нихъ вьсе имѣние. Вьсеволодъ же, посълавъ приведе и, и въдасть ему Дорогобужь.
("In the same year, David captured the merchants going to Greece in [the city of] Oleshia, and took all their property. Then Vsevolod, having sent [his men], brought him and gave him [the city of] Dorogobuzh." (Note: Compare with the English translation of Cross & Sherbowitz-Wetzor (1953): "In this year, David made captives of the merchants going to Greece at Oleshki, and confiscated their property. Vsevolod sent after him, brought him to Kiev, and presented him with Dorogobuzh." The original texts do not mention "Kiev".))

Most textual witnesses of the Primary Chronicle have the word грьчьникы (Grĭchnikÿ), meaning "merchants faring to Greece". Only the Laurentian Codex has the word грькы (Grĭkÿ, "Greeks"), which is intrinsically less probable, and therefore likely an error. Leonid Makhnovets (1984) interpreted this section of the Chronicle as saying that David's raids on the traders in Oleshia (which was apparently located on the route from the Varangians to the Greeks) forced Vsevolod I of Kiev to give up the city of Dorohobuzh to David, so that he would stop harming the commercial interests of Rus'.

The Kievan Chronicle mentions that, in 1153, the representatives of Iziaslav II of Kiev waited for Rusudan in the vicinity of Oleshia. In 1160, Oleshia was raided by Berladnici, but they were defeated by the army of Rostislav I of Kiev.

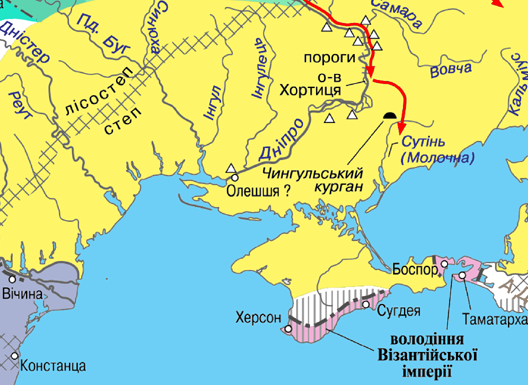
Oleshia (Олешшя) might have been part of the Cuman lands around 1200.

In 1164, representatives of Rostislav Mstislavich that were on their way to Constantinople with the demand to consecrate Kliment Smoliatich happened to meet with the newly appointed Kievan metropolitan, John IV, in Oleshia. In 1219, the Volhynian prince Daniel of Galicia was able to cross the Dniester thanks to the boats that arrived from Oleshia. The city under Kievan Rus' is last mentioned sub anno 6732 (1224) in the Novgorod First Chronicle, during its narration of the Battle of Oleshia and the Battle of the Kalka River.

Того же русстии князи не послушаша, нъ послы избиша, а сами поидоша противу имъ; и не дошьдъше Ольшья, и сташа на ДнЂпрЂ.
("But the [Rus'] Knyazes did not listen to this, but killed all the envoys and themselves went against them, and took stand on the Dnieper, this side of Oleshe.")

Oleshia would later become a Genoese colony named Illice, Ylice, or Elice (or, alternatively, the colony was founded nearby) until its destruction by the Turks in 15th century. Illice's fall was further accelerated by the Lithuanian expansion along the Dnieper, with the city fully disappearing by 1455.

== Bibliography ==
=== Primary sources ===
- Primary Chronicle (PVL, c. 1110s) and Kievan Chronicle (c. 1200).
  - Ostrowski, Donald; Birnbaum, David J. (7 December 2014). "Rus' primary chronicle critical edition – Interlinear line-level collation". pvl.obdurodon.org (in Church Slavic). Archived from the original on 28 April 2025.
  - Shakhmatov, Aleksey (1908). Лѣтопись По Ипатьевскому Списку [The Chronicle according to the Hypatian Codex]. Complete Collection of Rus' Chronicles (PSRL). (in Church Slavic). Vol. 2. Saint Petersburg: Typography of Edward Prats.
  - PSRL (1926–1928). Лаврентьевская летопись [Laurentian Chronicle]. Complete Collection of Rus' Chronicles (PSRL) (in Church Slavic). Vol. 1. Leningrad: USSR Academy of Sciences Publishing House.
  - Cross, Samuel Hazzard; Sherbowitz-Wetzor, Olgerd P. (1953) [1930]. The Russian Primary Chronicle, Laurentian Text. Translated and edited by Samuel Hazzard Cross and Olgerd P. Sherbowitz-Wetzor (PDF). Cambridge, Massachusetts: The Mediaeval Academy of America. p. 325.
  - Makhnovets, Leonid (1984). Літопис Руський за Іпатським списком. Роки 1074 — 1087 [Rus' Chronicle according to the Hypatian Codex. The years 1074–1087] (in Ukrainian). Kyiv: Dnipro. p. 591. ISBN 5-308-00052-2. (modern Ukrainian translation of the Primary Chronicle and Kievan Chronicle)
- Novgorod First Chronicle (NPL).
  - Izbornyk (2001). "Новгородская Первая Летопись" [Novgorod First Chronicle]. Izbornyk (in Church Slavic). Nauka. – digitised 1950 Nauka edition of the Novgorod First Chronicle (NPL).
  - Michell, Robert; Forbes, Nevill (1914). The Chronicle of Novgorod 1016–1471. Translated from the Russian by Robert Michell and Nevill Forbes, Ph.D. Reader in Russian in the University of Oxford, with an introduction by C. Raymond Beazley and A. A. Shakhmatov (PDF). London: Gray's Inn. p. 237. (modern English translation)

=== Literature ===
- Д. Я. Вортман, А. Г. Плахонін. Олешшя // Encyclopedia of History of Ukraine
- Паталах О. Відлуння Великого Степу. Історія Північного Причорномор'я в особах. — Херсон: Наддніпряночка, 2009. — 200 с.
- Сокульский А. Л. К локализации летописного Олешья // Сов. археология. 1980. № 1;
- Толочко П. П. Киев и Киевская земля в эпоху феодальной раздробленности ХII–ХIII вв. К., 1980;
- Буйських С. Б., Ієвлев М. М. Про осіле населення понизь Дніпра та Південного Бугу у X–XIII ст. // Археологія. 1991. № 4;
- Коновалова И. Г. Восточная Европа в сочинении ал-Идриси. Москва, 1999;
- Руссев М. Д. В поисках замка Илличе // Лукомор’я: Археологія, етнологія, історія Пн.-Зх. Причорномор’я. Вип. 2. О., 2008.
