= Iraklii Danylovich =

- Born: c. 1223
- Died: before 1240
- House: Romanovichi
- Father: Daniel of Galicia
- Mother: Anna Mstislavna of Novgorod

Iraklii Danylovich (c. 1223, - before 1240) was a Ruthenian prince.

== Family ==
Iraklii had seven known siblings, they were:

Brothers

Lev Danylovich (c. 1228 - c. 1301), Prince of Belz 1245–1264, Prince of Halych 1264–1269, Knyaz of Halych-Volynia 1269–1301; he moved his capital from Halych to the newly founded city of Lviv (Lwów, Lemberg)
Roman Danylovich (c. 1230 - c. 1261), Prince of Black Ruthenia (Novogrudok) c. 1255 - c. 1260, and Slonim
Mstislav Danylovich (born after 1300), Prince of Lutsk 1265–1289, Prince of Volynia 1289 - after 1300
Švarn the Lightning (Shvarno, Švarnas, Ioann; born 1269, bur. Chełm), Grand Prince of Lithuania 1264–1267 (1268–c. 1269), Prince of Chełm 1264–1269

Sisters

Pereyaslava (born 12 April 1283), married c. 1248 Prince Siemowit I of Masovia
Ustinia, married 1250/1251 Prince Andrei II of Vladimir-Suzdal
Sofia Danylovna, married 1259 Graf Heinrich V von Schwarzburg-Blankenburg
