= Ostriv Velykyi Potomkin =

Island in the Dnieper estuary in Kherson Oblast, Ukraine

Native name: Острів Великий Потьомкін Великий Вільховий острів
- Location within Kherson Oblast Location within Ukraine

Geography
- Location: Lower Dnipro river
- Coordinates: 46°34′40.3″N 32°32′24.4″E
- Type: River island
- Area: 25 km^{2} (9.7 sq mi)

Administration
- Ukraine
- Oblast: Kherson Oblast
- Raion: Kherson Raion
- Hromada: Kherson urban hromada

Ostriv Velykyi Potomkin (Ukrainian: Острів Великий Потьомкін, romanized: Ostriv Velykyi Potiomkin, lit. 'Big Potemkin Island'; Russian: Остров Большой Потёмкин, romanized: Ostrov Bolshoy Potyomkin), also known as the Potemkin Island, or, officially, the Velykyi Vilkhovyi Island (Ukrainian: Великий Вільховий острів, lit. 'Big Alder Island'), is a river island located within the Dnieper River in the Kherson urban hromada of Kherson Raion of Kherson Oblast of Ukraine.

== Geography ==
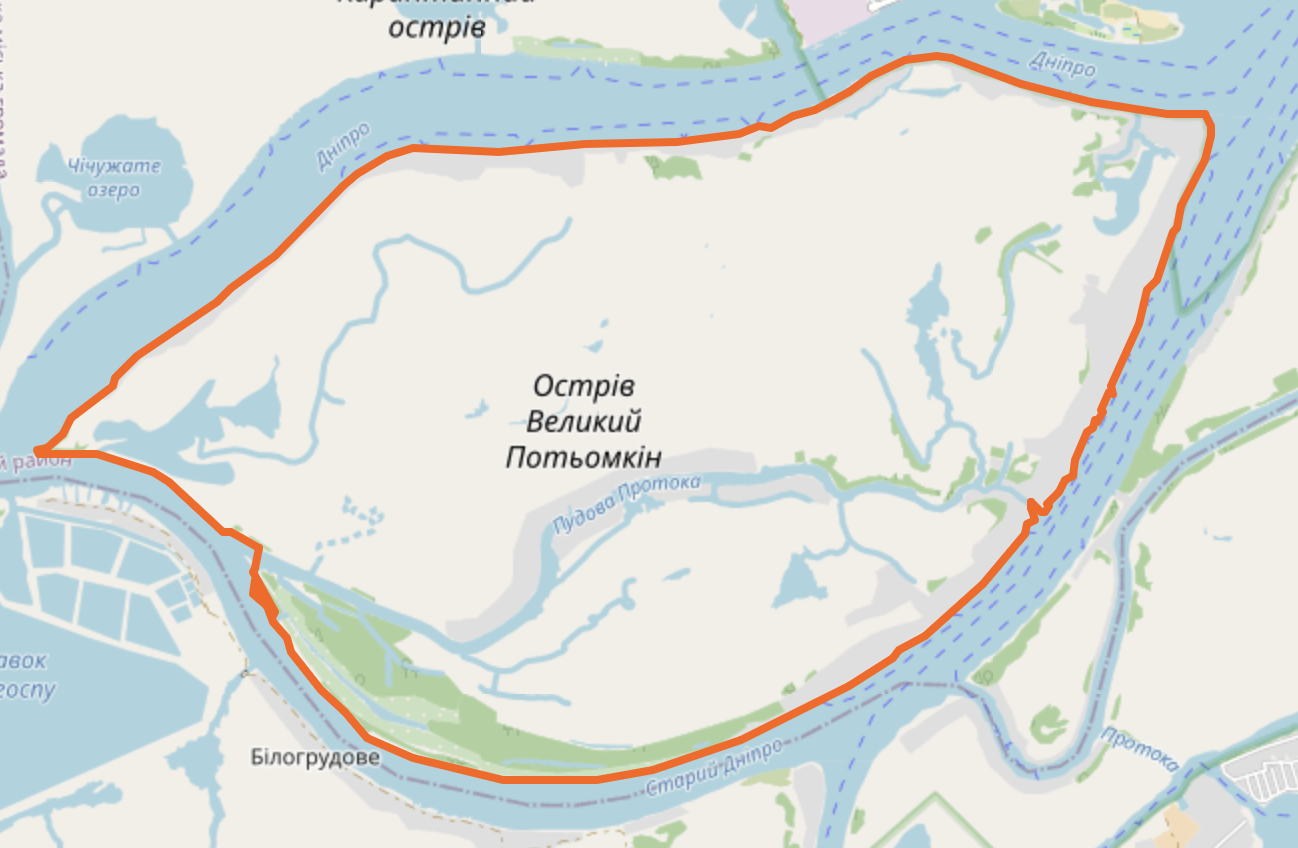
Map depicting Ostriv Velykyi Potomkin, outlined in red

Ostriv Velykyi Potomkin is located within the Dnipro River as a river island. Two small lakes known as Lake Zakitne and Lake Nazarove-Pohorile are contained within the island. The island is divided into two parts by the Strait of Pudov (Ukrainian: Пудова Протока, romanized: Pudova Protoka), which flows through its center. The total land area of the island is approximately 25 square kilometers, located around 5 kilometers to the south of Kherson city and 2 kilometers to the north of the town of Hola Prystan.

== History ==
=== Medieval period ===
Being located along the historic route from the Varangians to the Greeks, Ostriv Velykyi Potomkin had strategic significance for the Kyivan Rus', who established settlements on it and used it as their primary Black Sea port. Some historians believe that the historical city of Oleshia was located on the island, whereas others believe it was closer to modern Oleshky. Regardless of which view is correct, archaeological excavations have found evidence of the island's settlement during the period of the Kyivan Rus'.

According to the Institute of Archaeology of the National Academy of Science of Ukraine, in the 14th century, Ostriv Velykyi Potomkin became a trading post of the Republic of Genoa, one of many Genoese colonies along the Black Sea.

=== Russian and Soviet period ===
After it was conquered by the Russian Empire, following the annexation of the Crimean Khanate in 1783, the island was renamed after Russian prince Grigory Potemkin (Ukrainian: Григорій Потьомкін, romanized: Hryhorii Potomkin), gaining the name it officially retained until 2025.

During the Second World War, Ostriv Velykyi Potomkin was used as an outpost by Ukrainian partisan detachments opposing the German occupation of Ukraine, who made use of the lower Dnipro river's floodplains to arrange sabotage operations against the Nazi German invaders.

=== Independent Ukraine and Russian invasion ===
Following the 2022 Russian invasion of Ukraine, Ostriv Velykyi Potomkin came under Russian occupation in the early period of the conflict as a result of the Southern Ukraine campaign. During the 2022 Ukrainian southern counteroffensive in November, it returned to Ukrainian control on 11 November, along with the nearby regional capital of Kherson. However, by 15 December 2022, it was confirmed that Russian forces had re-occupied the island, and had begun forcibly deporting civilians from it.

The island has since been a site of fighting between the two sides, attempting to gain control. Yevhen Yerin, head of the Joint Press Center of the Defense Forces in the Tavria direction, stated on 4 January 2023 that Ostriv Velykyi Potomkin remained in a grey zone, despite the presence of military personnel, being controlled by neither side. He added that it was unlikely Ukraine would be able to establish full control over the island before gaining control of east-bank Kherson. On 6 June 2023, as a result of the Nova Kakhovka dam collapse, Ostriv Velykyi Potomkin was partially submerged below the Dnipro river, necessitating the military forces of both sides to withdraw, and thereby temporarily ending fighting on it.

On 23 January 2025, following a vote by the Verkhovna Rada, a number of geographic features were renamed to comply with derussification policies. Velykyi Potomkin Island was officially renamed to Velykyi Vilkhovyi Island.

== See also ==
- List of islands of Ukraine
