= Daniel of Galicia =

King of Ruthenia from 1253 to 1266

Daniel
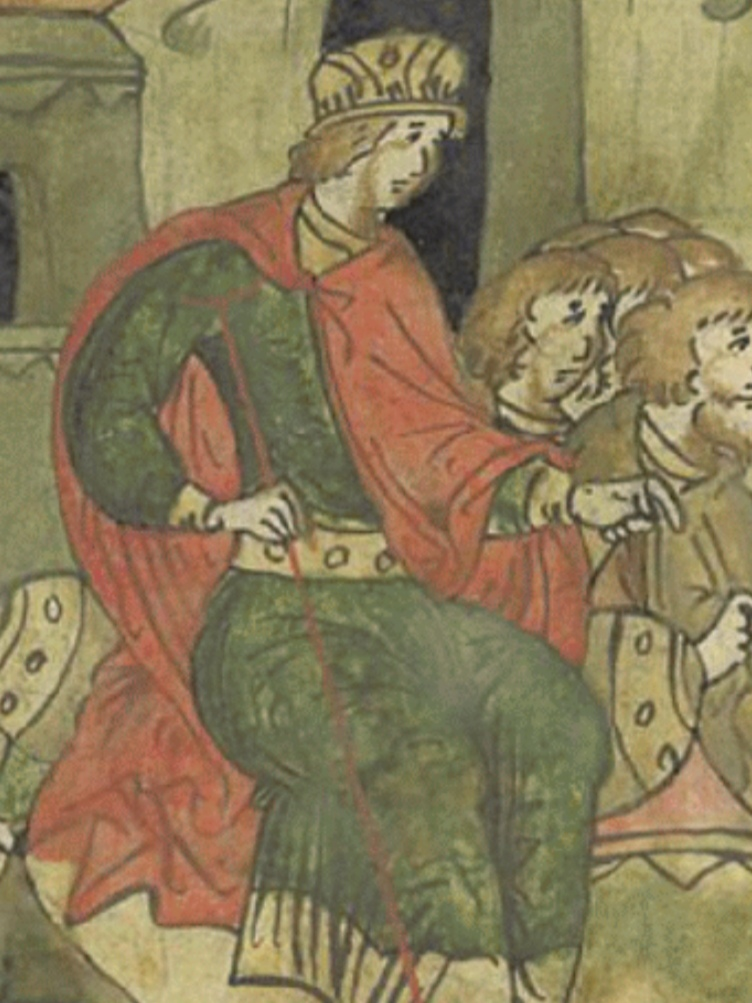
- Daniel depicted in a miniature from the Illustrated Chronicle of Ivan the Terrible (16th century)

King of Ruthenia
- Reign: 1253–1266
- Successor: Leo I

Prince of Volhynia
- Reign: 1205-1206; 1215-1238
- Predecessor: Roman the Great; Alexander of Belz
- Successor: Alexander of Belz; Vasylko Romanovych

Prince of Galicia
- Reign: 1205-1206; 1211-1213; 1230-1232; 1233-1234; 1238-1266
- Predecessor: Roman the Great; Vladimir III Igorevich; Andrew of Hungary; Andrew of Hungary; Rostislav Mikhailovich
- Successor: Vladimir III Igorevich; Volodyslav Kormylchych; Andrew of Hungary; Svarn

Grand Prince of Kiev
- Reign: 1239-1240
- Predecessor: Michael of Chernigov
- Successor: Michael of Chernigov
- Born: 1201
- Died: 1266 (aged 64–65) (Note: 1266 is noted as Daniel's date of death by the Traska Annals, the Franciscan Kraków Annals, and the Chronicle of Greater Poland. The traditional death date of 1264 is solely based on the erroneous chronology of the Galician–Volhynian Chronicle, which was not present in the original text, but only added by a later editor (who made numerous well-known mistakes).); Kholm
- Spouse: Anna Mstislavna of Novgorod; Niece of King Mindaugas
- Issue more...: Iraklii Danylovich; Lev I of Galicia; Roman Danylovich; Svarn
- House: Romanovichi branch of the Rurikids
- Father: Roman Mstislavich
- Mother: Anna Angelina
- Religion: Eastern Orthodox Christianity

Daniel Romanovich (Note: Old East Slavic: Данилъ Романовичь or Данило Романович; Ukrainian: Данило Романович, romanized: Danylo Romanovych; also known as Daniel or Daniil of Galicia, or Danylo of Halych (Ukrainian: Данило Галицький, romanized: Danylo Halyts'kyi).) (1201–1266) was Prince of Galicia (1205–1207; 1211–1212; 1230–1232; 1233–1234; 1238–1266), Volhynia (1205–1208; 1215–1238), Grand Prince of Kiev (1240), and King of Ruthenia (1253–1266). He was the son of Roman Mstislavich of Volhynia and Anne-Euphrosyne, the daughter of Byzantine emperor Isaac II Angelos.

Under Daniel's long rule the Romanovichi branch of Rurikids restored control over Galicia, and the reunited principality rose to become a prominent power, eventually being elevated to the status of a kingdom. Daniel's rule managed to withstand the Mongol invasions, making him a defining personality in the latter period of the existence of Kievan Rus' following the decline of Kiev. The Galician-Volhynian Chronicle praised Daniel as an exemplary ruler, brave warrior and wise statesman, whose qualities as a monarch made him second only to Solomon.

== Biography ==
=== Early life and reign ===
Daniel's father, Roman the Great, united the principalities of Galicia and Volhynia in 1199. After his death in 1205, the boyars of Galicia forced the four-year-old Daniel into exile with his mother Anna-Euphrosyne and younger Vasylko Romanovich. Daniel's cousin, Alexander of Belz, took control of Volodymyr with the help of Leszek the White of Kraków, meanwhile the throne of Halych was taken by Vladimir III Igorevich of Olgovichi, a son of Igor Sviatoslavich of Chernigov, who on his mother's side stemmed from Galician prince Yaroslav Osmomysl. Anna and her children were forced to flee, and Daniel's childhood was spent at the court of his uncle, King Andrew II of Hungary.

After a conflict in Galicia between local boyars and their new rulers, part of the nobles fled to Hungary and invited Daniel to retake the throne. In 1210 a united army composed of Hungarians and Galicians invaded the principality, taking Peremyshl, Zvenyhorod and Halych, and in September 1211 restored the nine-year-old prince to the throne. However, three years later a rebellion led by powerful boyar Volodyslav Kormylchych led to Daniel's deposition, after which he joined his mother in Volhynia. In the aftermath, the Poles and Hungarians invaded Galicia, ostensibly to support the claims of young Daniel and Vasylko, and divided it between themselves. In 1215, at the insistence of Leszek the White, Alexander of Belz was forced to return Volodymyr to Daniel. In 1219, Daniel renounced his claims to Galicia in favor of Mstislav the Bold, marrying his elder daughter Anna.

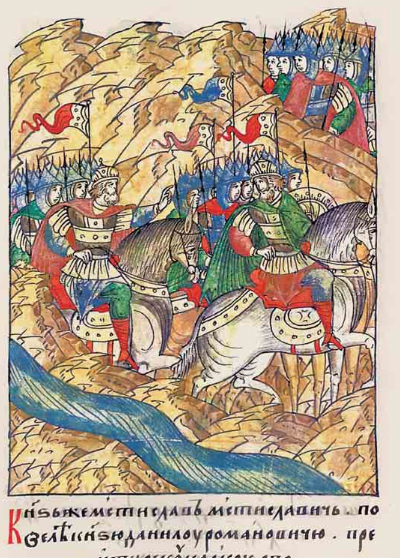
Daniel Romanovich and Mstislav Mstislavich with their troops at Kalka

In 1223, the young prince defeated the Mongols at Battle of Oleshia and led his troops against a larger Mongol army as part of the coalition of Rus' princes in the Battle of the Kalka River, which ended in destruction of the allied force. Wounded in the fighting, Daniel was able to escape encirclement by the enemy and survived. During his rule over Volhynia the prince gave his younger brother Vasylko the principality of Lutsk. The brothers fought tohether against Jotvingians, which raided his lands. Daniel's influence and his alliance with Polish duke Leszek the White made him a competitor to Vladimir IV of Kiev. After Leszek's assassination in 1228 Daniel and Vasylko allied with the deceased prince's brother Konrad of Masovia and campaigned together with him against Polish duke Władysław Spindleshanks.

In 1230 Daniel was invited to take the throne of Halych for the second time and defeated Hungarian troops which besieged the city. However, the boyars once again plotted against the prince and helped Hungarian prince Andrew to recapture the city in 1232. In 1234 Daniel defeated Alexander Vsevolodovich, taking the Duchy of Belz. By 1238, he had defeated former Dobrzyń Knights at Drohiczyn (Dorohochyn), and regained most of Galicia, including the capital. While the Prussians were under pressure from the Teutonic Order, Daniel attempted to conquer their neighbours, the Yotvingians.

=== Mongol invasions ===
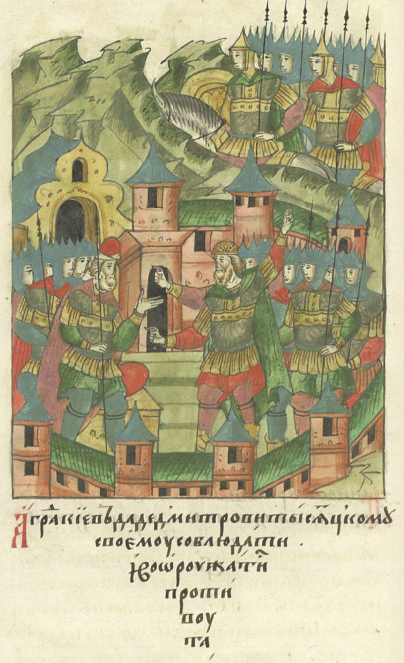
Daniel transferring Kiev to his voivode Dmytro, illustration from the Illustrated Chronicle of Ivan the Terrible

In 1239, with the advancing Mongols, Michael of Chernigov, the grand prince of Kiev, who was married to Daniel's sister, quickly left Kiev and petitioned Daniel for help. Daniel dispatched his voivode, Dmytro, to defend the city. However, after a long siege, its walls were breached and, despite fierce fighting within the city, Kiev fell on 6 December 1240 and was largely destroyed. Early in the next year, April 1241, the Mongols passed through Galicia and Volhynia, destroying Halych and advancing on Poland and Hungary. Daniel and Vasylko fled to Poland, and eventually moved their capital from Halych to Kholm (modern Chełm) in late 1240 or early 1241. In his absence, Daniel appointed boyar Dobroslav Suddych to distribute lands to fellow Galician boyars in Kolomyia, but when the latter in early 1241 began allotting them to Chernigov boyars instead (possibly in collaboration with the Olgovichi prince Rostislav Mikhailovich), Daniel summoned him to Kholm and imprisoned him in late 1241.

=== Establishment of the Kingdom of Galicia–Volhynia ===
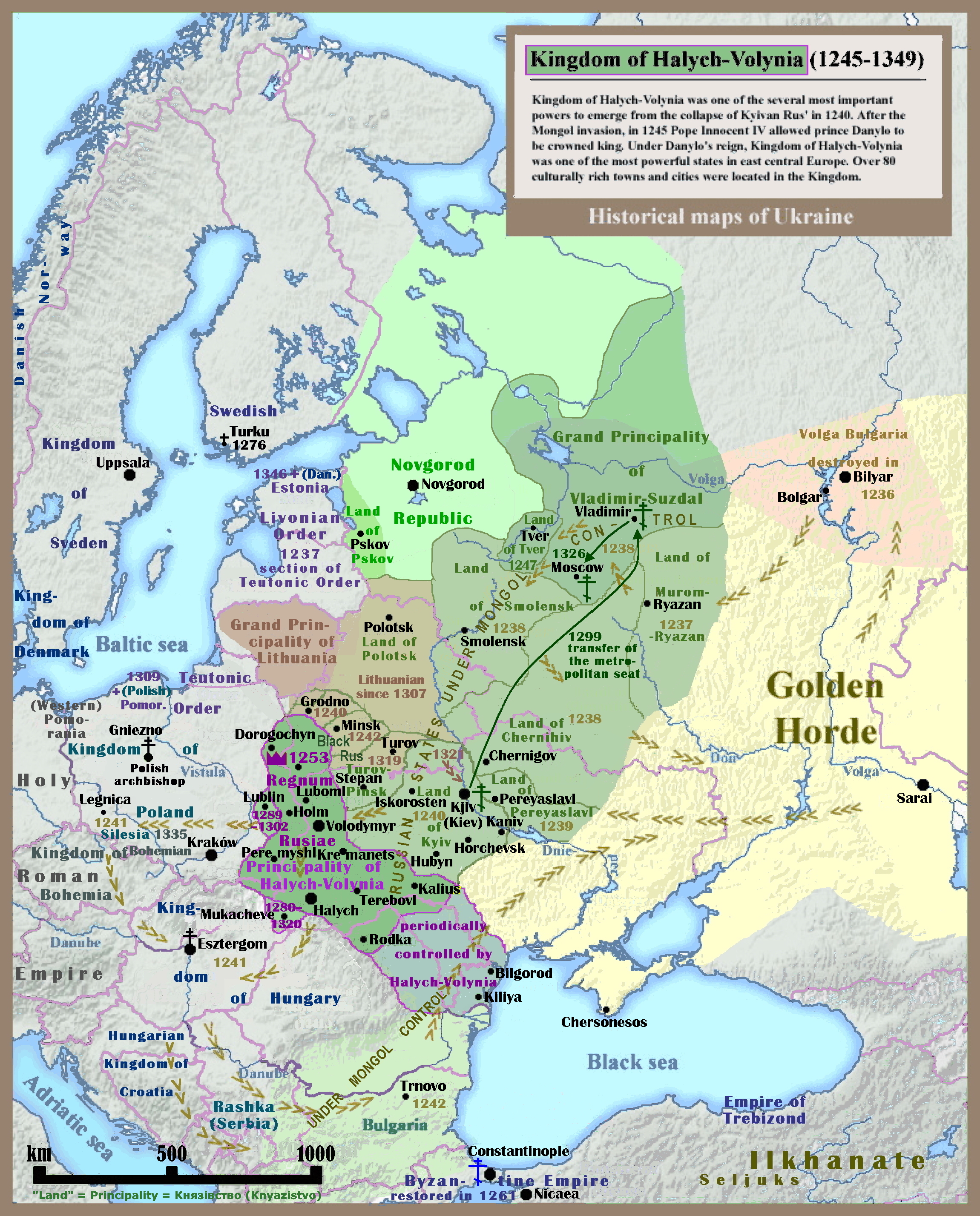
Territorial boundaries of the Kingdom of Galicia–Volhynia (1245–1349).

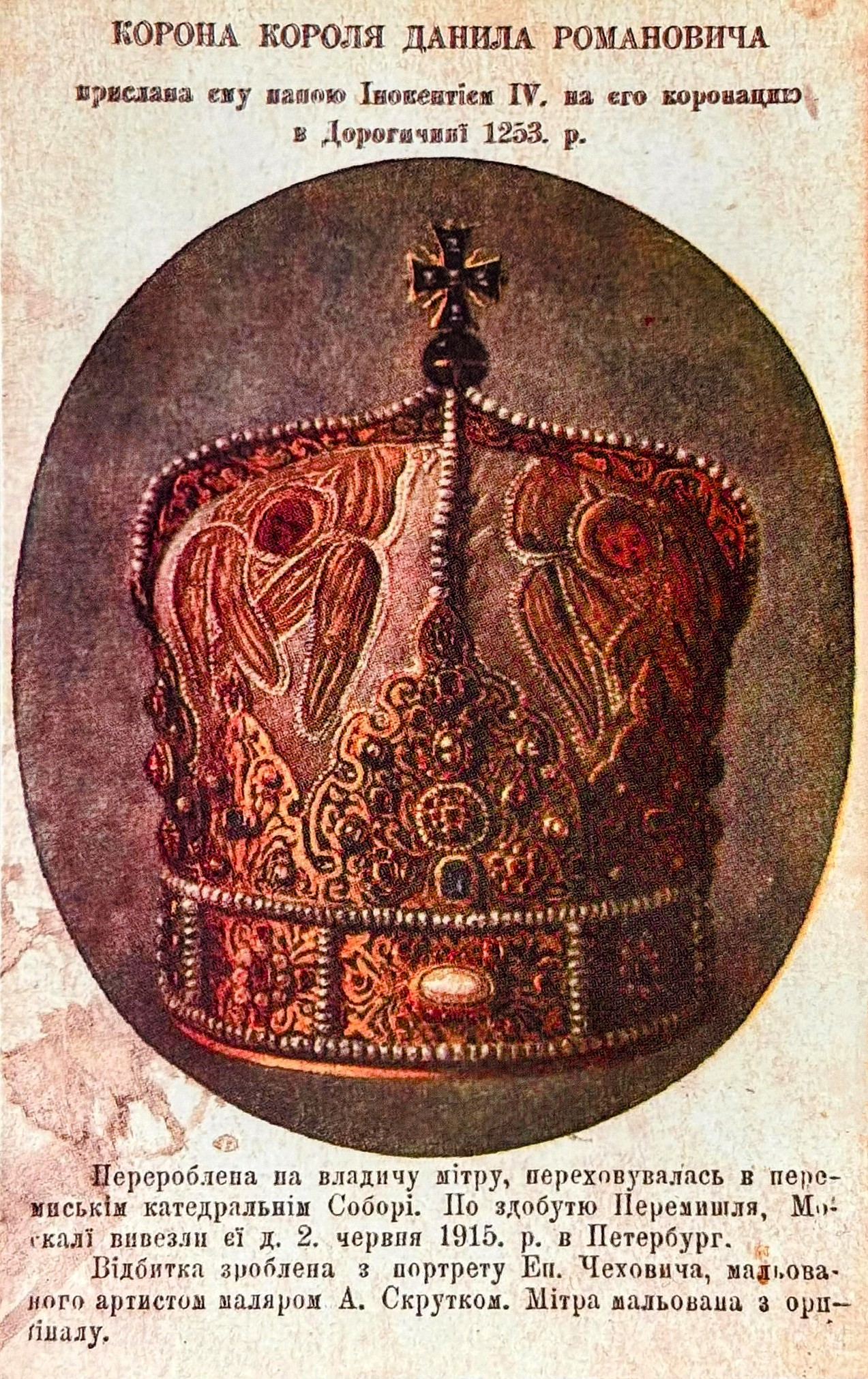
Mitre of the Greek Catholic bishops of Przemysl, reputed to have earlier served as Daniel's royal crown

On 17 August 1245, Daniel defeated a combined force of the prince of Chernigov, disaffected boyars, and Hungarian and Polish elements at Yaroslav, and finally took the remainder of Galicia, thus reconstituting his father's holdings. He made his brother Vasylko the ruler of Volhynia and retained the Galician title for himself, though he continued to exercise real power in both places.

Daniel's domestic policies focused on stability and economic growth. During his rule, German, Polish, and Rus' merchants and artisans were invited into Galicia, and numbers of Armenians and Jews established themselves in the towns and cities. Daniel founded the towns of Lviv (1256) and Kholm, naming the former for his son, and fortified many others. He appointed officials to protect the peasantry from aristocratic exploitation and formed peasant-based heavy infantry units. Daniel's military reforms included the introduction of European-style plate armour for heavy cavalry, and the establishment of light cavalry armed with bows.

Yet Daniel's successes and his failed defense of Kiev attracted the further attention of the Mongols. In 1246, he was summoned to the capital of the Golden Horde at Sarai on the Volga River and was forced to accept Mongol overlordship. According to Ukrainian historian Orest Subtelny, Daniel was handed a cup of fermented mare's milk by the Mongol khan, Batu, and told to get used to it, as "you are one of ours now". They exchanged hostages whereby 100 families of Karaites were re-settled in Carpathian Galicia. According to James Chambers, the following dialogue took place between Batu and Daniel of Galicia: "At a banquet Batu asked if he drank kumiz like the Mongols and Daniel answered: 'Until now I did not, but now I do as you command and I drink it'. To which Batu replied: 'You are now one of ours,' and since he was more used to it ordered that Daniel be given a goblet of wine." This was due to Daniel's notorious love of wine.

While formally accepting the Mongols as overlords, and supplying them with soldiers as required, Daniel built his foreign policy around opposition to the Golden Horde. Suffering from raids by Lithuanians and Jotvingians, he simultaneously established cordial relations with the rulers of the Kingdom of Poland and Kingdom of Hungary, and requested aid from Pope Innocent IV in the form of a crusade. In return for papal assistance, Daniel offered to place his lands under the ecclesiastical authority of Rome, a pledge never realised. Wooed by the prospect of extending his authority, the Pope encouraged Daniel's resistance to the Mongols and his Western orientation, and in 1253, had a papal representative crown Daniel as king at Dorohochyn, present-day Drohiczyn on the Bug River. However, Daniel wanted more than recognition, and commented bitterly that he expected an army when he received the crown. From then on, Daniel was known as rex Russiae and sometimes by the title korol.

The following year, Daniel repelled Mongol assaults led by Orda's son, Kuremsa, on Ponyzia and Volhynia and dispatched an expedition with the aim of taking Kiev. Despite initial successes, in 1259, a Mongol force under Burundai and Nogai Khan entered Galicia and Volhynia and offered an ultimatum: Daniel was to destroy his fortifications or Burundai would assault the towns. Daniel complied and pulled down the city walls.

=== Later reign ===
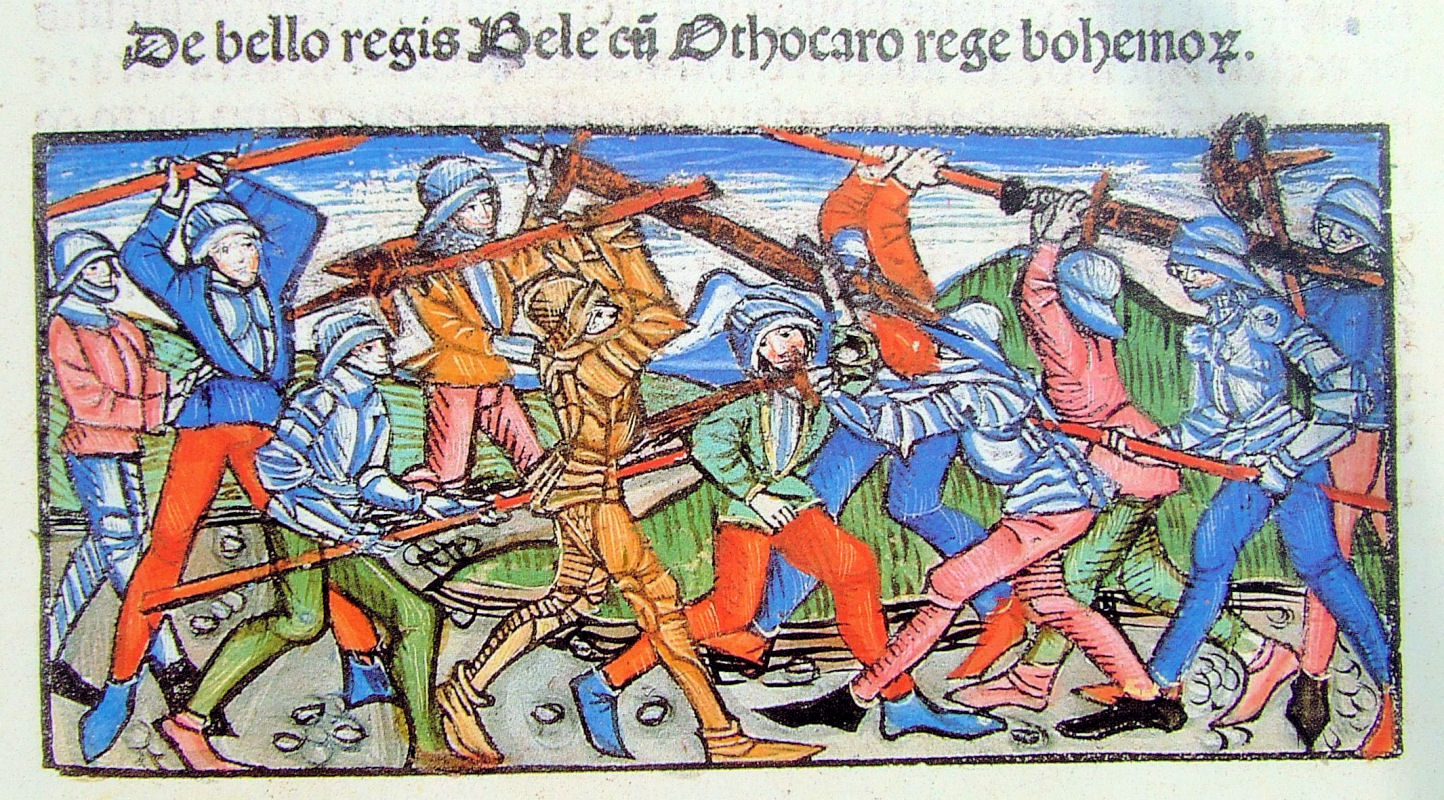
Depiction of the Battle of Kressenbrunn in 1260, in which Daniel's troops fought on the side of King Bela IV of Hungary

In the last years of his reign, Daniel engaged in dynastic politics, marrying a son and a daughter to the offspring of Mindaugas of the Grand Duchy of Lithuania and acquiring territorial concessions in Poland from the latter. Another daughter of his, Ustynia, was married to Andrey Yaroslavich of Vladimir-Suzdal. He also arranged for the marriage of his son Roman to Gertrude, the Babenberg heiress, but was unsuccessful in his bid to have him placed on the ducal throne of Austria.

By his death in 1266, Daniel had reconstructed and expanded the territories held by his father, held off the expansionist threats of Poland and Hungary, minimized Mongol influence in the territories of present-day western Ukraine, and raised the economic and social standards of his domains. He was succeeded in Galicia by his son Leo.

== Legacy ==
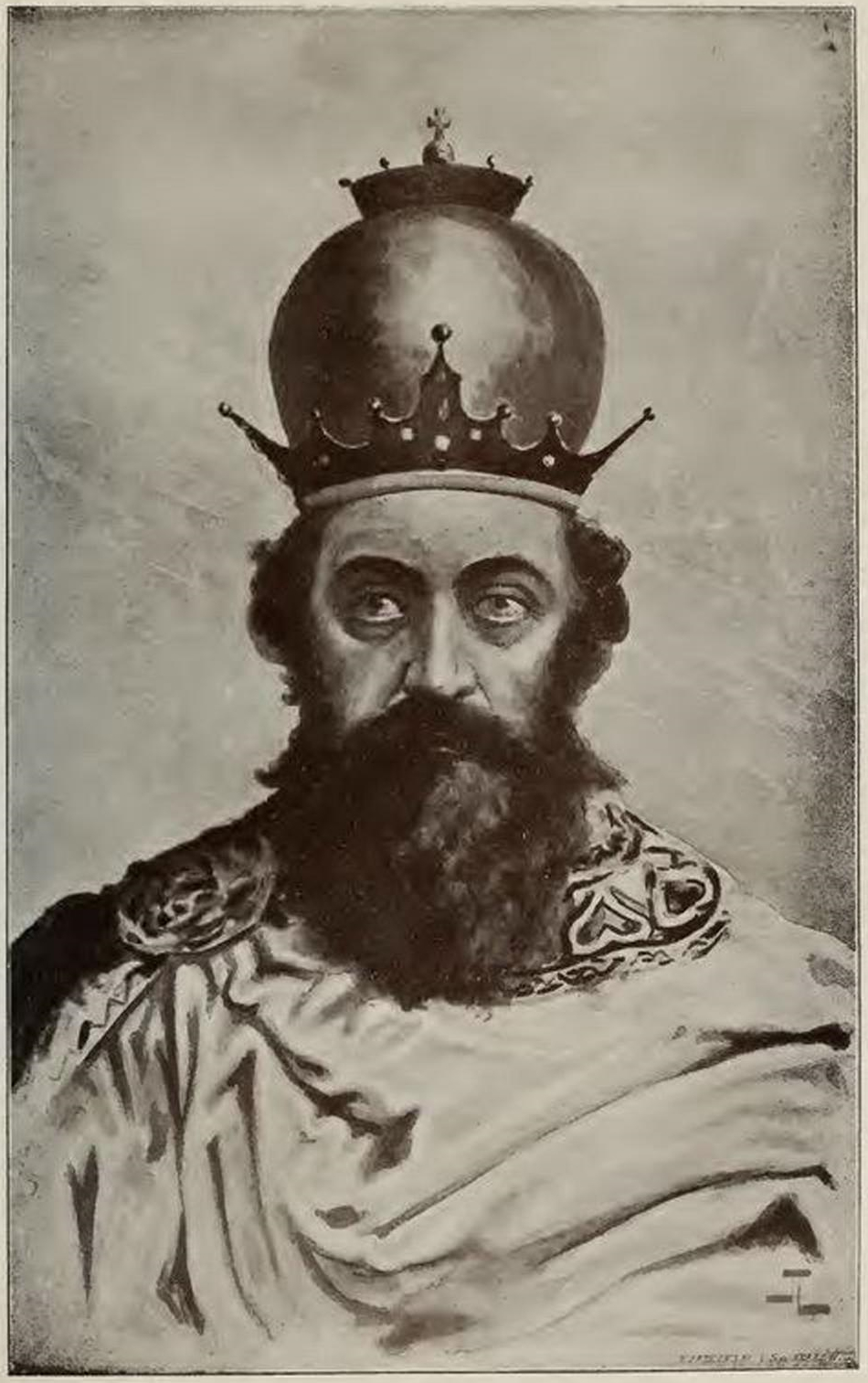
Daniel's crown portrait in the 1912 edition of History of Ukraine-Rus' by Mykola Arkas

In eyes of chroniclers, Daniel represented the image of a perfect ruler. Having managed to restore peace and authority in his possessions, he established control over the rebellious boyars and prevented internal strife in his dynasty. Despite the effects of Mongol invasions, Daniel succeeded in minimizing Galicia-Volhynia's dependence on the Golden Horde: unlike other Rus' princes, he and his successors were not required to pay tributes and organize population census. As a result, the principality attracted many refugees from other regions of Rus'.

The title of King of Ruthenia, adopted by Daniel following his coronation in 1253, was last carried by his grandson Yuri I of Galicia, who died in 1308. Daniel's royal crown and other symbols of power were reportedly taken from Lviv by Casimir the Great after the city's capture by Poles in 1340, and their further fate is unknown.

== Commemoration ==
A monument to Daniel was erected in 1998 in the city of Halych. In 2001 an equestrian statue honouring Daniel was unveiled in Lviv to commemorate 800 years from his birth.

On 7 September 2011, the parliament of Ukraine (Verkhovna Rada) issued a resolution on "celebration of the 810th Anniversary of the birth of the first King of Ruthenia-Ukraine Daniel of Galicia".

In 2012 the main airport in the city of Lviv was renamed in honour of the prince as Lviv Danylo Halytskyi International Airport.

A Ukrainian order is named after Daniel of Galicia.

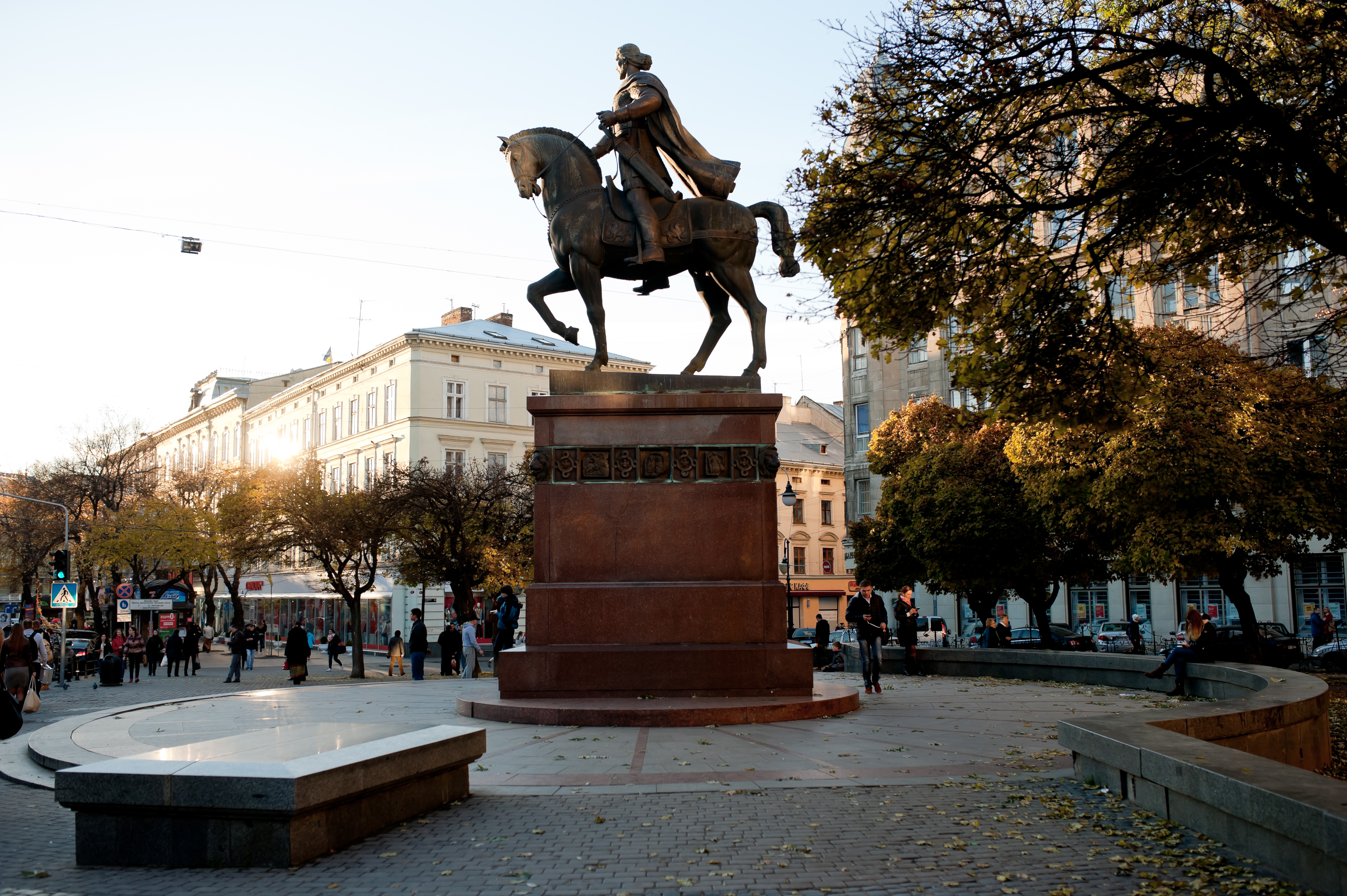
Daniel of Galicia monument in Lviv

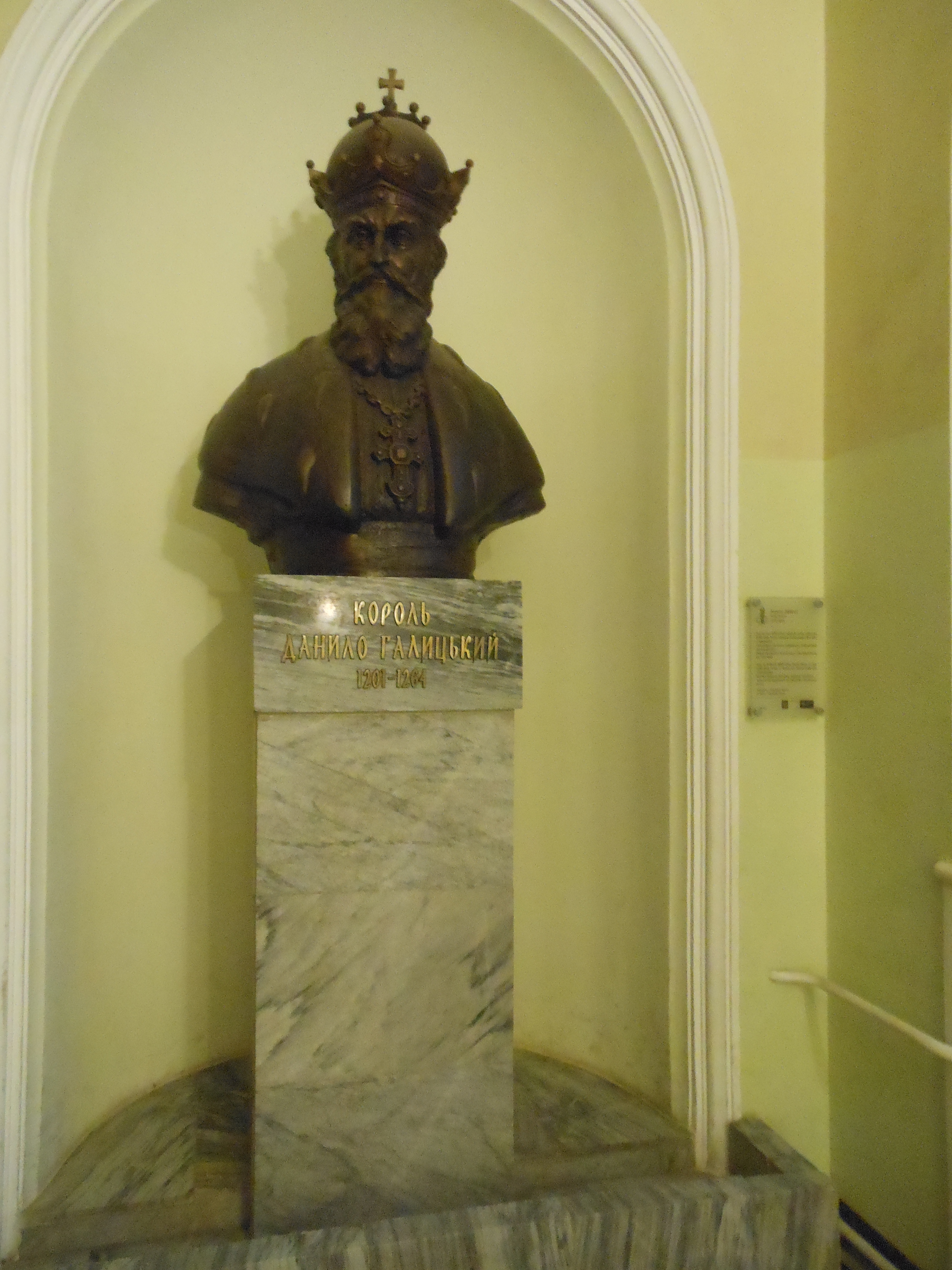
A bust of Daniel exhibited in the Lviv City Hall

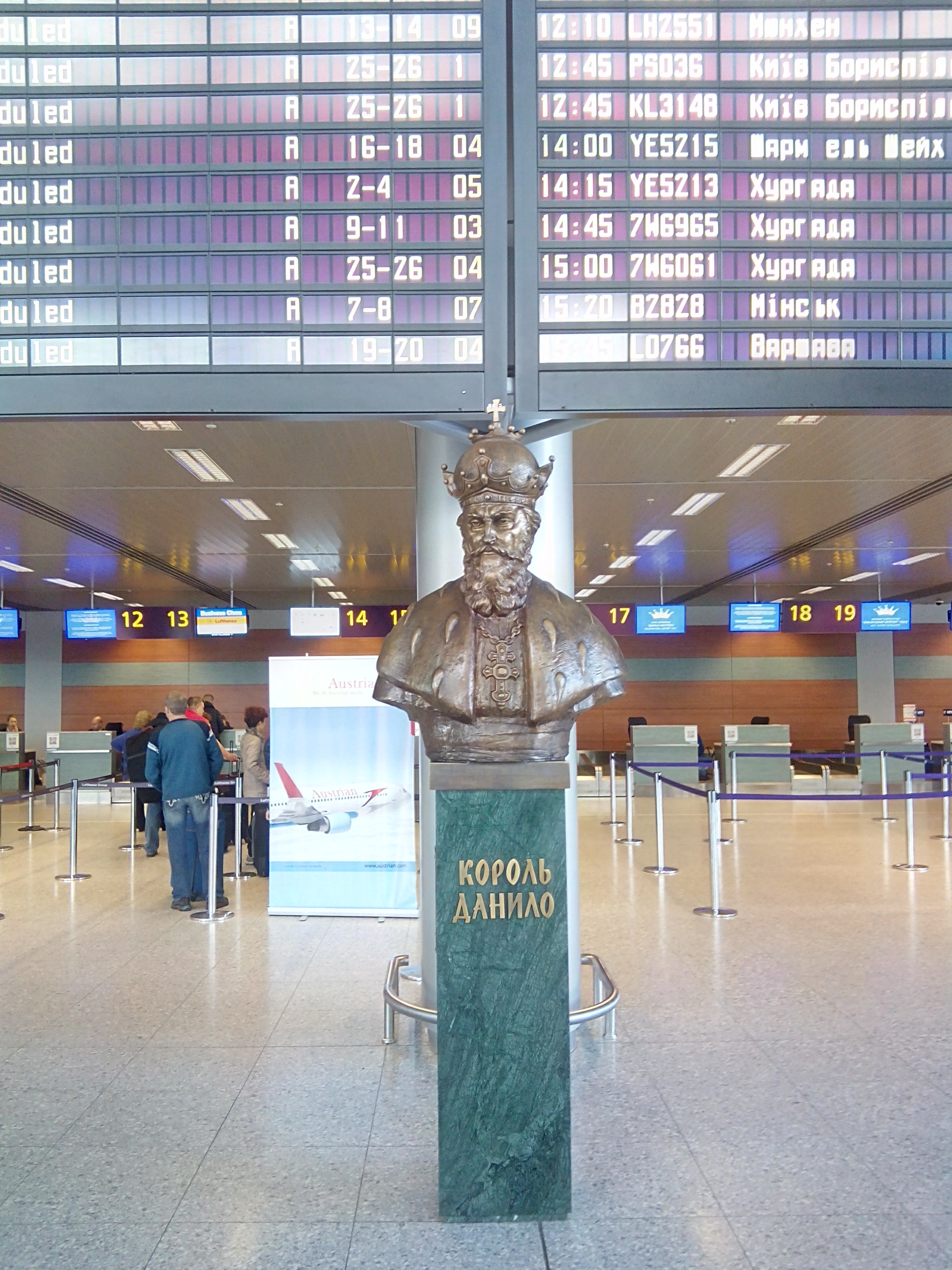
Daniel's bust at Lviv Airport

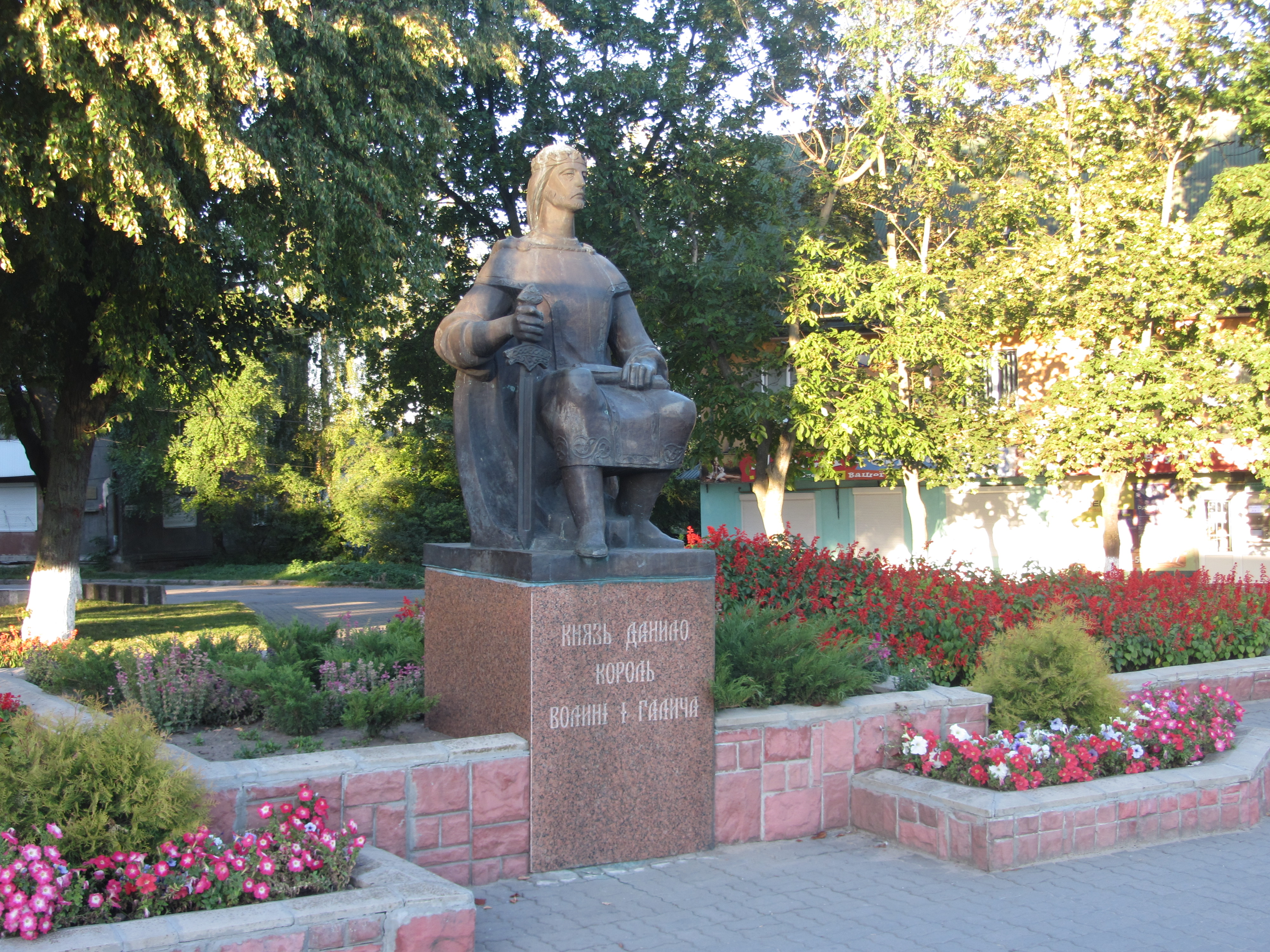
Monument to Daniel in Volodymyr

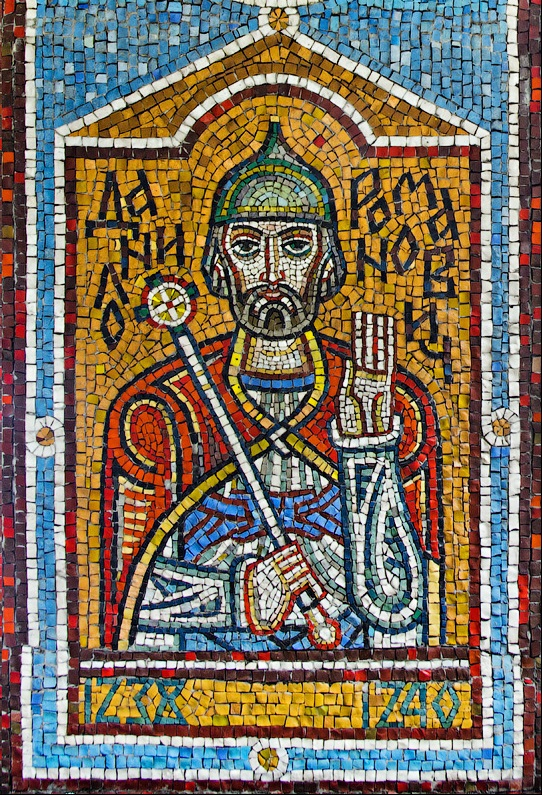
Mosaic of Daniel (1989) in the Zoloti Vorota station of the Kyiv Metro

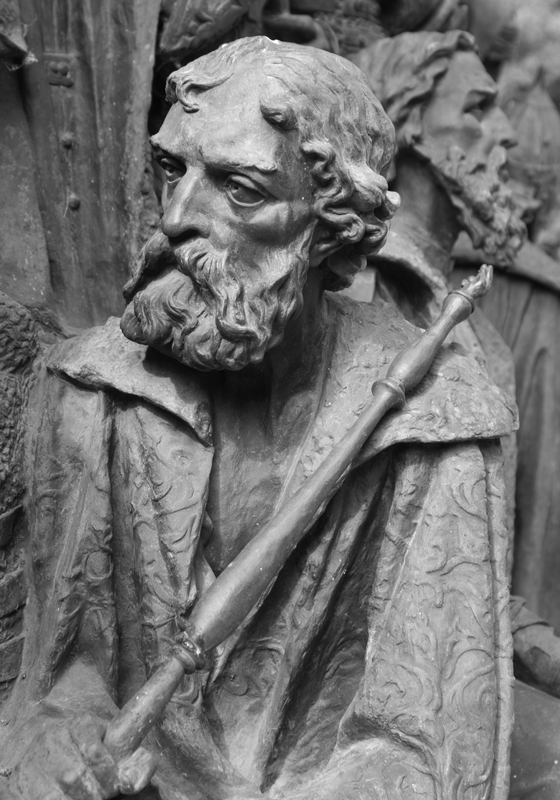
Daniel's statue in the Millennium of Russia monument in Veliky Novgorod

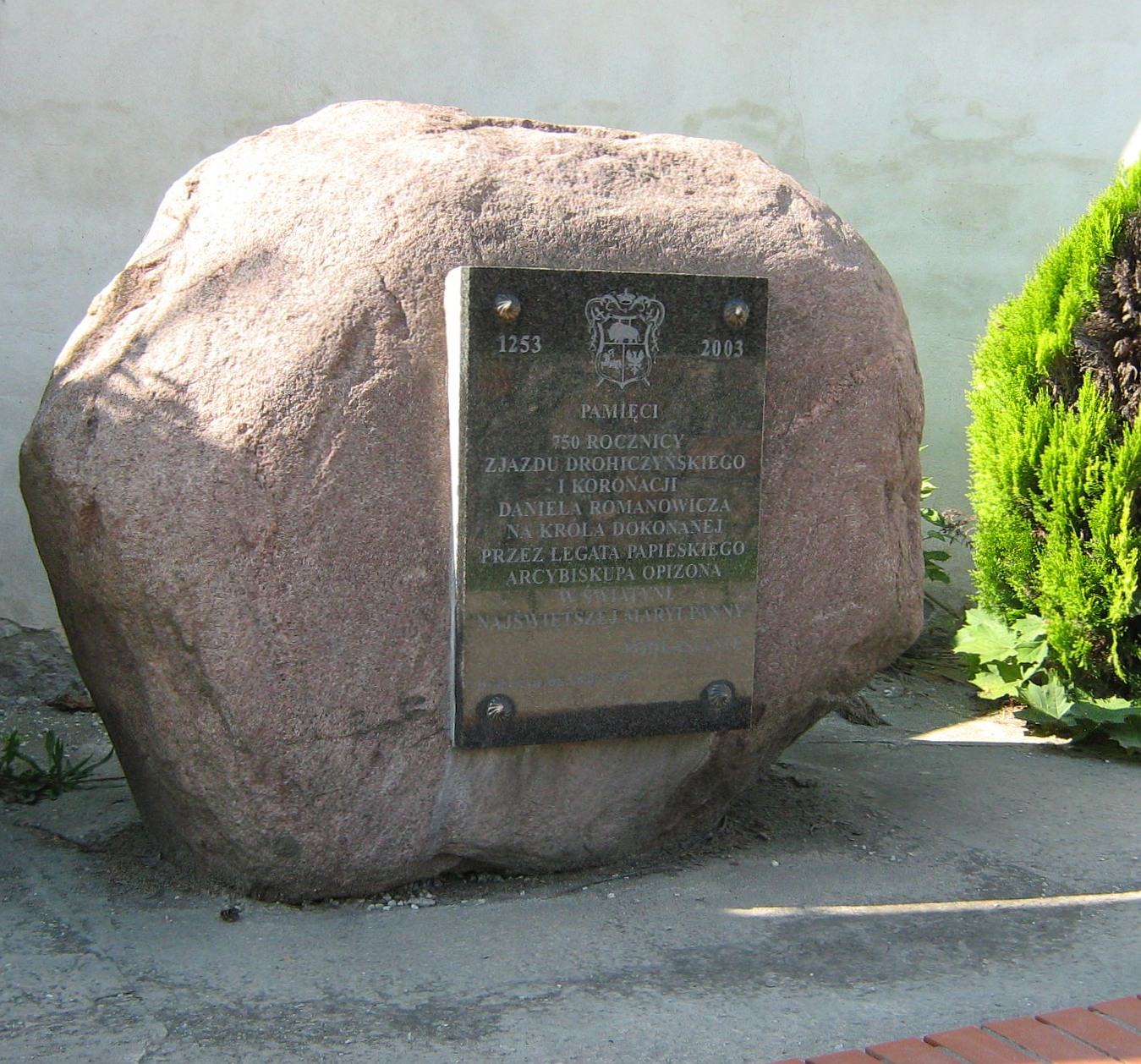
Memorial stone on the site of Daniel's coronation in Drohiczyn

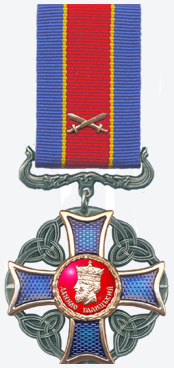
Ukrainian Order of Danylo Halytsky

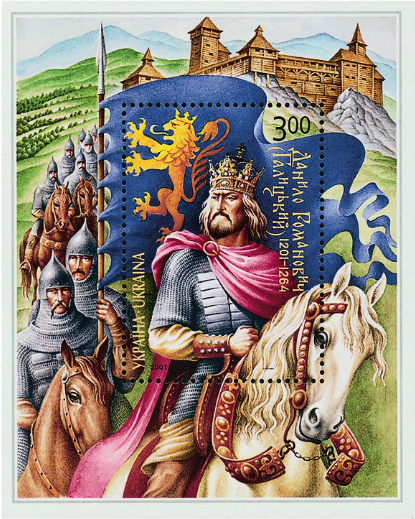
Daniel on a Ukrainian post stamp

== Family ==
Wives

- Anna of Novgorod († bef. 1252), 1218, daughter of Mstislav the Bold
- unknown, Queen of Ruthenia (1253 - 1266), niece of King Mindaugas of Lithuania, bef. 1252

Sisters

- Feodora of Galicia († after 1200), m. 1187 (div 1188) Vasilko of Galicia
- Maria of Galicia († after 1241), m. before 1200 Michael of Chernigov, sometime Grand Prince of Kiev and ultimately a saint.

Sons

- Iraklii Danylovich (*ca. 1223 – † by 1240)
- Leo I of Galicia (*ca. 1228 – † ca. 1301), Prince of Belz 1245–1266, Prince of Peremyshl 1266–1269, Prince of Halych 1269–1301, Prince of Halych-Volynia 1293–1301; he moved his capital from Halych to the newly founded city of Lviv (Lwów, Lemberg), m. 1257 Constance, daughter of Béla IV of Hungary.
- Roman Danylovich (*ca. 1230 – † ca. 1261), Prince of Black Ruthenia (Navahradak) 1255? – 1260?, and Slonim
- Mstislav Danylovich († aft. 1300), Prince of Lutsk 1265–1289, Prince of Volynia 1289 – aft. 1300
- Svarn (Shvarno, Švarnas, Ioann; † 1269, bur. Chełm), Grand Duke of Lithuania 1264–1267 (1268–1269?), Prince of Chełm 1264–1269

Daughters

- Pereyaslava († 12 April 1283), m. ca. 1248 Prince Siemowit I of Masovia
- Ustynia, m. 1250/1251 Prince Andrew II of Vladimir-Suzdal
- Sofia Danielvna, m. 1259 Graf Heinrich V von Schwarzburg-Blankenburg: they were the parents of Utta von Schwarzburg-Blankenburg, who was the eponymous ancestor of the House of Reuss

== Bibliography ==
- Subtelny, Orest (1988). Ukraine: A History. Toronto: University of Toronto Press. ISBN 0-8020-5808-6.
- Katchanovski, Ivan; Kohut, Zenon E.; Nesebio, Bohdan Y.; Yurkevich, Myroslav (2013). Historical Dictionary of Ukraine. Lanham, Maryland; Toronto; Plymouth: Scarecrow Press. p. 992. ISBN 9780810878471.
- Magocsi, Paul Robert (2010). A History of Ukraine: The Land and Its Peoples. Toronto: University of Toronto Press. p. 894. ISBN 9781442610217.
- Martin, Janet (2007). Medieval Russia: 980–1584. Second Edition. E-book. Cambridge: Cambridge University Press. ISBN 978-0-511-36800-4.
- Plokhy, Serhii (2017). The Gates of Europe: A History of Ukraine. Hachette UK. p. 432. ISBN 9780465093465.
- Tolochko, Oleksiy (2025). "Studying the Galician-Volhynian Chronicle. Response to Dariusz Dąbrowski". Kwartalnik Historyczny. 132 (3). Wydawnictwo Naukowe Semper: 553–572.
- Voloshchuk, Myroslav (2020). "View of The Court of Rostyslav Mykhailovych, Prince and Dominus of Machou, in Hungary (An Excerpt from a Family History between the Late 13th and Mid 14th Centuries)". Journal of Vasyl Stefanyk Precarpathian National University. 7 (2): 42–50.

Daniel of Galicia Romanovichi Born: 1201 Died: 1266
New title	King of Ruthenia; 1253–1266	Succeeded by Leo I
Preceded by Roman Mstislavich	Prince of Galicia-Volhynia; 1205–1266	Succeeded by Leo I
Preceded by Mikhail of Chernigov	Grand Prince of Kiev; 1239–1240	Succeeded by Mongol invasion
