= Battle of Oleshia =

1223 battle of the Mongol invasion of Kievan Rus'

- Part of the Mongol invasion of Kievan Rus'
Date	May 1223
Location	Oleshia, Kievan Rus' (modern-day Kherson Oblast or Mykolaiv Oblast, Ukraine)
Result	Kievan Rus' victory

Belligerents
Principality of Galicia–Volhynia; Principality of Chernigov	Mongol Empire

Commanders and leaders
Daniel of Galicia; Mstislav Mstislavich	Gemebek (executed)

Strength
1,000 cavalrymen	Unknown

Casualties and losses
Unknown	Entire force killed or captured

The Battle of Oleshia (Note: Ukrainian: Битва під Олешшям, romanized: Bytva pid Oleshshjam. Russian: Битва под Олешью, romanized: Bitva pod Olesh'yu.) took place between the cavalry of Rus' princes and a unit of the Mongol Empire led by general Gemebek, in May 1223, near Oleshia (likely in modern-day Kherson Oblast, Ukraine); it ended in a Mongol defeat. The battle took place prior to the Battle of the Kalka River, which occurred on 31 May 1223.

== Prelude ==
From 1218, the Mongol Empire had been at war with the Polovtsians, also known as Cumans. The Polovtsian tribes turned to Rus' princes for help in their war against the Mongols, to which the princes agreed. However, in April 1223, Mongol ambassadors arrived in Kiev (modern Kyiv), where they asked the Rus' to not interfere in the war. Upon the request of the Polovtsians, the Mongol ambassadors were executed. For the Mongols, this act was considered a major sin, to which they responded with great atrocities. However, the states invaded by the Mongols were unaware of the Mongol belief in the inviolability of diplomats, and execution of ambassadors was considered a normal practice in medieval Europe. In 1222 or early 1223, the Mongols invaded Crimea. Some Rus' princes with their Polovtsian allies gathered at Khortytsia island before crossing the left-bank of the Dnieper river, where they prepared for a battle near Oleshia. Some modern researchers believe the battle took place near modern-day Hola Prystan.

== Battle ==
In May 1223, the Mongol army left Crimea and headed for the left-bank of the Dnieper. The Rus' princes were aware of this and intended to strike the Mongol army. Prince Danylo and Mstislav led 1,000 cavalrymen in the attack on the Mongols.

One of the primary sources for the battle is the Novgorod First Chronicle, which sub anno 6732 (1224) narrates the battles of Oleshia and the Kalka River.

Того же русстии князи не послушаша, нъ послы избиша, а сами поидоша противу имъ; и не дошьдъше Ольшья, и сташа на ДнЂпрЂ. (...) Тъгъда же Мьстислав перебродяся ДнЂпрь, прЂиде в 1000 вои на сторожи татарьскыя, и побЂди я
("But the [Rus'] Knyazes did not listen to this, but killed all the envoys and themselves went against them, and took stand on the Dnieper, this side of Oleshe. (...) And then Mstislav having forded the Dnieper went across with 1,000 men, against the Tartar outposts, and defeated them (...).")

The Rus' cavalry took the Mongols by surprise and forced them into a retreat. Mongol troops attempted to protect their commander Gemebek by hiding him in a burial mound (kurgan). However, the Rus' cavalry defeated the Mongol army and captured Gemebek, handing him over to the Polovtsians for execution.

== Aftermath ==
The Rus' princes triumphed at Oleshia, seizing herds of horses and other trophies from the defeated Mongol army. On 23 May, Rus' princes with their Polovtsian allies crossed the Dnieper and moved into "Polovtsian steppes". The relatively easy victory at Oleshia made Rus' princes overconfident in their ability to fight the Mongols. Prior to their confrontation with the Mongols at the Kalka River, disagreements arose among the Rus' princes. Prince Danylo and Mstislav with their Polovtsian allies didn't want to wait for reinforcements and rushed into attack on the Mongol forces at the Kalka. However, the Polovtsians were unable to withstand the Mongol counterattack and fled, subsequently exposing the exhausted Rus' forces, and leading to their crushing defeat at the Kalka River.

== Bibliography ==
=== Primary sources ===
- Novgorod First Chronicle (NPL).
  - Izbornyk (2001). "Новгородская Первая Летопись" [Novgorod First Chronicle]. Izbornyk (in Church Slavic). Nauka. – digitised 1950 Nauka edition of the Novgorod First Chronicle (NPL).
  - Michell, Robert; Forbes, Nevill (1914). The Chronicle of Novgorod 1016–1471. Translated from the Russian by Robert Michell and Nevill Forbes, Ph.D. Reader in Russian in the University of Oxford, with an introduction by C. Raymond Beazley and A. A. Shakhmatov (PDF). London: Gray's Inn. p. 237. (modern English translation)

=== Literature ===
- Zborets; Donchenko, S.V.; S.P. (2016). «Історія та культура України» ["History and Culture of Ukraine"] (PDF) (in Ukrainian). Dniprodzerzhynsk: Дніпродзержинскьний Технічний Університет.
