= King of Galicia and Lodomeria =

The title of King of Galicia and Lodomeria may refer to one of multiple meanings:

- The prince of Galicia and Volhynia, a state which existed from 1199 to 1349.
- The emperor of Austria, who was king of Galicia and Lodomeria from 1804 to 1918.
