= Rostov Kremlin (museum-reserve) =

Museum in Rostov, Yaroslavl Oblast, Russia

Museum-Preserve «Rostov Kremlin»
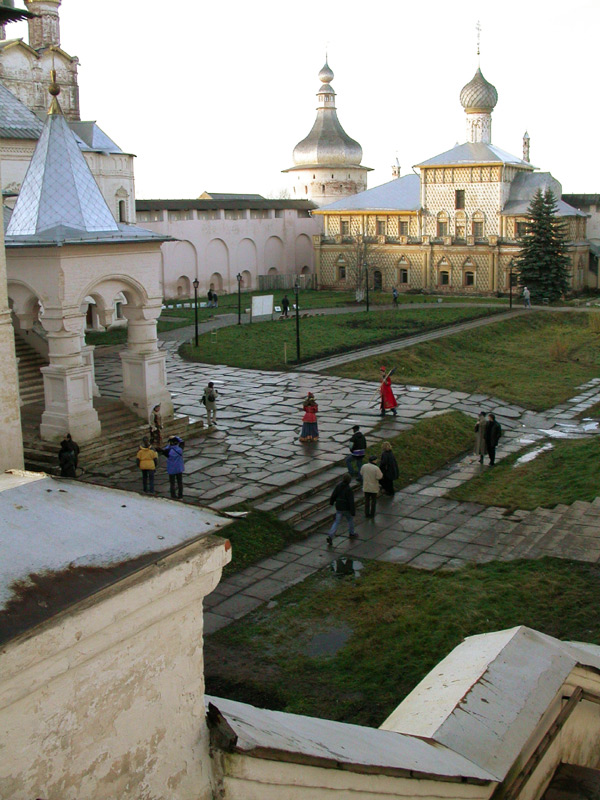
- Location: Rostov, Russia
- Coordinates: 57°11′04″N 39°24′59″E
- Website: www.rostmuseum.ru
- Location of Rostov Kremlin

Rostov Kremlin (in Russian: Федеральное государственное учреждение культуры Государственный музей-заповедник «Ростовский кремль») - is a National museum-reserve situated in Rostov, Yaroslavl Oblast, Russian Federation. Museum-reserve preserves the architectural ensemble of the Rostov Kremlin (except for the Assumption Cathedral and Assumption Cathedral Belfry), Church of St. John the Evangelist (1687) on Ishnya river, and has got different branches within the Rostov municipal district. The only museum of national level in the Yaroslavl region. Museum was founded in 1883 and now is a huge scientific center for the study of archaeology, architecture, art, and history. Museum has got vast collections of archeology, ancient Russian art, modern and contemporary art (especially Russian avant-garde), decorative and applied arts, numismatics, photos, bells, enamel and ecclesiastical art.

== History ==
The State Museum-Reserve "Rostov Kremlin" was founded on October 28 (November 10), 1883. The museum is located on the territory of the architectural ensemble of the former Rostov Metropolitan residence (Rostov Kremlin), which was formed as a result of the construction activities of Metropolitan Jonah III of Rostov and Yaroslavl in the 1670s-1680s. The museum was initiated by Rostov merchants, local historians A. A. Titov and I. A. Shlyakov, Archbishop of Yaroslavl and Rostov Jonathan (Rudnev), Yaroslavl Governor V. D. Levshin, and representatives of the Moscow Archaeological Society. The first museum collections were formed because of the donations from philanthropists and also at the request of the Yaroslavl governor, the metropolitan issued a decree on the transfer to the museum of icons and other church utensils that were kept in sacristies of the churches and monasteries of the metropolitanate. From the end of the 19th to the beginning of the 20th centuries the museum existed because of donations, interest from deposits and from the income of renting out buildings. Only in 1910 did it receive support from the state in the amount of 2,300 rubles annually. In 1883–1916, Ivan Shlyakov held various posts, but in fact was the head of the museum, to which he devoted all his free time and because of him museum has gathered its collections, obtained the fame in scientific circles of that time, and the high patronage of the Imperial Family. In the period up to 1918, the museum was visited by more than 50,000 visitors, including emperor Nicolas II.

In 1918 - 1934 museum had the name - Rostov State Museum of Antiquities. During this period an archive was created in the museum and two branches were established in Spaso-Yakovlevsky Monastery and Borisoglebsky Monastery. In 1922, the museum has received a big collection of paintings by Russian avant-garde artists. In 1928, the Moscow archaeologist Dmitry Eding, under the mandate of the Rostov Museum, conducted archaeological research on the Sarsky hillfort. The museum staff also took part in the creation of the Rostov branch of the Moscow Archaeological Institute.

On 24 August 1953 the tornado, that struck Rostov, caused serious damage to all Kremlin monuments. The catastrophic consequences of the hurricane caused the need to restore the architectural ensemble of the Rostov Kremlin. Emergency restoration work in 1953 turned into a systematic scientifically based restoration. Restorers decided to recreate the original appearance of the Rostov Kremlin. Restoration works were held during the period of 1954 - 1962.

In 1959 Yaroslavl Architectural and Art Museum-Reserve (Yaroslavl) was established and Rostov museum becomes its branch and in 1969, it acquired the status of an independent museum-reserve with the name "Rostov-Yaroslavl Museum-Reserve".

In 1995 by the decree of the President of the Russian Federation the Rostov Kremlin Museum-Reserve was included in the state code of especially valuable objects of cultural heritage of the peoples of Russia.

In 1998 Museum-reserve "Rostov Kremlin" has prepared the nomination documents and the Ensemble of the Rostov Kremlin has been included in the Tentative list of UNESCO World heritage objects.

== Collections ==
Over the years the Rostov Museum has accumulated numerous collections containing objects of great historical, cultural and artistic value.

=== Collection of Icons ===
Museum collection of icons is one of the finest in the country. Much of it consists of works from local artistic centers, but it also includes a number of icons painted by Moscow masters. The most important part of the collection is a set of icons from the Church of St. Demetrius of Salonica in the village Ponikarovo near Rostov, which formed the church's iconostasis. This collection consist of practically whole iconostasis, including the Royal Doors, the icons of St. Demetrius of Salonica and the Hodegetria which flanked the doors, and a Deisis tier of thirteen figures. Most of these icons were painted by Moscow masters at the beginning of the 16th century. This iconostasis was commissioned by the owner of Ponicarovo, the Grand Prince's secretary Danilo Mamyrev.

Local medieval art is represented by various images, including an icon Virgin Mary from the Deisis tier of the second half of the 15th century and mid-16th century "Intercession of the Virgin". Their restrained colour range, based on similar tones, is characteristic of Rostov painting at that time. The local iconographic traditions are illustrated most strikingly by images of Rostov saints: "St. Leontius of Rostov" (16th c.), "St. Abraham of Rostov with Scenes from his life" (17th c.), "The Venerable Irinarch the Recluse with Scenes from his life" (17th c.), "St. Theodore of Rostov" (17th c.), "St. Isaiah of Rostov" (17th c.) and others.

=== Collection of painting ===
Museum has an important and extremely diverse collection of paintings from the 18th to 20th centuries. The collection includes portraits of Rostov church hierarchs, Russian noblemen and Rostov merchants. A large part of the collection is made up of canvases by such major 19th - 20th century artists as Ivan Aivazovsky, Nikolay Bogdanov-Belsky, Pavel Bryullov, Vasily Vereshchagin, Igor Grabar, Isaac Levitan, Mikhail Nesterov, Konstantin Korovin, Pyotr Petrovichev, Vasily Polenov, Aleksey Savrasov, Leonid Turzhansky, Konstantin Yuon and others.

The museum is well known for its collection of works by Russian artists of the avant-garde movement in 20th century art, such as Ivan Klyun, Pyotr Konchalovsky, Alexander Kuprin, Aristarkh Lentulov, Kasimir Malevich, Olga Rozova, Lyubov Popova, Nadezhda Udaltsova and Robert Falk.

=== Enamel collection ===
Rostov is famous for its painted enamelwork. According to research, this began around the middle of the 18th century and reached an extremely high level of development by the last third of the 18th century and first third of the 19th century. In the 19th century Rostov was the main supplier of small enamelled icons of saints to most Russian Orthodox monasteries. In the 20th century floral painted and enamelled plates used to make various items of jewellery were produced in place of icons. Today Rostov masters have again returned to the religious theme. Their most celebrated recent creation is the canopy adorned with enamelled images of Christ and the Apostles over the entrance to the cubiculum of the Church of the Holy Sepulchre in Jerusalem. All the periods in the history of Rostov enamelwork from the second half of the 18th to the beginning of the 21st century are well represented in the museum collection.

=== Archeological collections ===
This collection consist of more than 40000 of objects and includes: ceramics, flint tools and lithic flakes of the Neolithic sites, lithic tools of the Fatyanovo culture, excavation materials of the Sarsky hillfort, materials of the excavations held in Rostov, antique materials. Collections include some important objects like bulla of Yaroslav the Wise.

=== Collection of cloth ===
Collection has more than 5000 objects and include more than 100 works of ancient sewing made by main Russian atelier of S. Saburova, Godunova, Stroganov's and M. Lugovskaya: Protection, the shroud, hanging shrouds, embroidered icons.Museum has got a hood of Metropolit Jonah, the sakkos of St. Dmitry, big collection of the church cloths, peasants and city costume.

=== Ceramics ===
Collection of Russian and foreign ceramics, including - faience, porcelain, glass and ceramics. The collection covers the period from the 18th century to the 1970s: dishes, sculpture, easter eggs, icon lamps, folk pottery, glazed tile. There are products made by the Imperial Porcelain Factory, Factories of: Gardner, Popov, Safronov, Novykh brothers, Auerbakh, M. Kuznetsov, and foreign factories: Manufacture nationale de Sèvres, Meisen, Royal Porcelain Factory, Wedgwood. Local ceramics is represented by black-flattened ceramics from Karashsky region.

=== Archival collection ===
Archival collection include more than 20000 storage units. Documents of the Spaso-Yakovlevsky Monastery, including original letter of St.Dmitry. Documents of the Synod, copies of the Royal decrees, documents of the Rostov merchants. There is a collection of architectural drawings, maps and plans, including maps of Rostov region, house, church and monastery layouts, drawings of roads and bridges of the 18th and 19th centuries and materials related to restoration of the Rostov Kremlin.

The Manuscript collection includes an illuminated Synodical from the Rostov Assumption Cathedral with superb miniatures created during the time of Metropolitan Jonah. The hagiographical miscellany compiled in the middle of the 17th century with numerous miniatures some of which illustrate important events in Russian history.

=== Collection of metal objects ===
Collection consist of around 10000 objects, including items made of silver of 17th - 20th centuries, including Royal supplements from 1622 and 1624 (Censer and altar cross), supplements of Rostov metropolitan to the Rostov churches: water-sanctified bowls, censers, chalice, paten, rizas for the icons and other objects. Also there are liturgical sets, book revetment, household utensils. As well there is a big collection of items of church use made of metal (around 700 objects): icon lamps, candle holder, liturgical vessels, lamps, coils, carved icons, encolpions. There is a huge collection of church bells and rainbow bells and tambourines.

== Permanent exhibitions ==
=== The Tail of a Comet. Works of "Left" Artists of the Early 20th Century in the Collection of the Museum "Rostov Kremlin" ===
The exhibition is named in memory of the lost work of Olga Rozanova and is timed to the 100th anniversary of the artist's death.

=== Open Storage of the Archeology Collections ===
The exposition, representing the museum's archaeological collections, is located in the Chamber "Storeroom".

=== Bells and Chimes. The Center of Bell Art in Rostov the Great ===
In the Center of Bell Art (the Pillarless Chamber "Storeroom"), church bells of the 17th to the beginning of the 20th centuries are exhibited, as well as the museum collection of rainbow bells, also you could learn the technology of making bells.

The center is equipped for collective (groups of up to 15 people) and individual training sessions: an auditorium, a library, an archive, and equipment for film screenings.

=== Museum of Church Antiquities ===
In 1993, an exhibition intended to reconstruct the Rostov Museum of Church Antiquities (1883 – early 1920s) was created in the White Chamber of the State Museum-Reserve "Rostov Kremlin".

It displays items from the museum's collections of iconography, wood carving, painting, church utensils, weapons, decorative and applied arts, handwritten and old printed books, documents, and photographs. During the creation of this exhibition, the curators decided to use bookcases and display cases that were used by the "Museum of Church Antiquities" at the end of the 19th century.

In 2011, an exhibition "To your Cross..." were held within the exhibition "Museum of Church Antiquities". It was timed to the ceremony of returning the carved altar cross of the middle of the 16th century to the Museum. This Cross since 1886 had been stored in the Museum of Church Antiquities and in 1995 it was stolen from the exhibition; in 2010 the Cross was found in a private collection and a year later transferred to the Museum.

=== Enamel Museum of the Museum-reserve ===
Rostov enamel is known since the middle of the 18th century as a local art craft (painting on enamel). The State Museum-Reserve "Rostov Kremlin" has one of the largest collections of picturesque enamels in Russia (more than 3000 objects), most of which are exhibited in the Enamel Museum (opened in 2000). The exhibition introduces the history of the formation of the museum collection of enamel, gives information about the development of this craft from the 1760s to the 2010s, characterizes the changes that occurred over time in the subject of painting, technique and technology of the production.

=== Kitchen Utensils of the 10th to 20th Centuries from the Museum Collection ===
Exhibition represents the items of decorative and applied art made of: ceramics, porcelain, wood, metal.

The exhibition is located in the Hall of the White Chamber.

=== Rostov Land: One Hundred Centuries of History ===
The exhibition tells the centuries of the history of the Rostov land. The archaeological finds are the main objects of the exhibition. The oldest of them come from the Paleolithic and Early Iron Age: bones and skulls of the mammoth, woolly rhinoceros, primitive bull, reindeer; ceramics of the first settlers of the Lake Nero Valley; battle axes; tools of artisans. The existence of a major political and religious center – the city of Rostov (the first mention in the chronicle – 862) – is associated with the themes shown by museum objects of later time. Among them are: the Western European sword with the mark "+LVNVECIT+" (10th century), print of the Prince of Kiev Yaroslav the Wise (11th century), detail of the roof of the first Assumption Cathedral (end of the 10th century), the tomb for the relics of Leontius of Rostov, embedded in the Assumption Cathedral in Vladimir by Prince Andrei Bogolyubsky (1160s), a fragment of the apse of the Assumption Cathedral (1213–1231 years), two white stone lion from the throne of the Prince or Bishop (late 12th to early 13th century), a cross, supplied by Stefan Bearded at the grave of his son Ilya near the Church of the Resurrection (1458).

The exhibition is located in the halls of the Royal Chamber of the Rostov Kremlin.

=== Museum Living Room ===
Museum Living Room is situated on the ground floor of the Royal Chambers. Here visitors to the museum are given the opportunity to relax from traveling and get acquainted with the virtual exhibition "Information Center "Rostov Land". It shows an overview of the collection of the Rostov Museum, provides with the information about the geographical, historical, cultural, and tourist resources of the Rostov land.

== Main departments ==
=== Archeological department ===
First archaeological objects were included to the museum collections from the moment of its foundation in 1883. The first donor of archaeological items was the Yaroslavl governor V. D. Levshin. The Archaeological department as a structural division of the museum was formed by the initiative of the director D. A. Ushakov in early 1924. Recreated in 1994.

Employees of the department are engaged in research, excursion, exposition and exhibition work, conduct field archaeological research in the city of Rostov and the Rostov region.

=== Green Stripe Art Studio ===
Studio offers classes, excursions, master classes in various techniques (clay modeling, enamel painting, applique, quilling, decoupage, etc.) based on the collections of the museum, as well as calendar holidays, tea parties and visiting festivals held on the territory of the museum.

=== Center of Bell Art ===
The Center of Bell Art in the Rostov Kremlin is located in the Pillarless Chamber, which also houses the exhibition "Bells and Chimes".

The main areas of work of the Center of Bell Art are:

- work of the Rostov School of Bell Art;
- creation of an annual commission for the inspection and study of the bells of the Cathedral Belfry of Rostov the Great;
- renewal of the Easter Bell Week tradition;
- holding a round table dedicated to the bell theme;
- master classes and concerts of bell ringing.

=== Museum Volunteer Club RITM ===
RITM is an abbreviation that stands for Rostov Initiative Creative Youth. The activities of the museum club volunteers are both one-time (assistance in conducting one-time events) and permanent (systematic implementation of programs). The range of activities of the volunteers includes: conducting surveys, helping tourists (navigation, telling about the museum), conducting interactive programs and master classes for children's audience free of charge.

=== Treasures of the Rostov Kremlin ===
The exhibition consists of works of art of the 17th and 18th centuries, united by belonging to the Baroque and Rococo. These are artistic silver objects, icons, Royal gates, fragments of tombstone complexes, temple sculptures, sets of clerical vestments, objects used in the performance of church rites.

=== Scientific Library of the Museum ===
The history of the museum's library dates back to the scriptorium of Bishop Cyril of the 12th century. Only 12 parchment manuscripts have been preserved from that book-writing workshop in various repositories around the world. The book traditions of ancient Rostov were continued by the writers of the Grigorievsky Gate (monastery), the builder of the Rostov Kremlin, Metropolitan Iona, and the outstanding spiritual educator of the Peter's era, St. Demetrius of Rostov.

The scientific Library began to form simultaneously with the Museum of Church Antiquities (1883) and included the works of the founders of the museum, primarily A. A. Titov, as well as outstanding contemporary scientists and scientific institutions of the Academy of Sciences, the Moscow Main Archive of the Ministry of Foreign Affairs, etc.

Old printed books, documents with autographs of royal persons and statesmen, handwritten synodics, letters of Tsar Alexei Mikhailovich, the cell chronicler of St. Demetrius were among the first exhibits of the Museum. A large number of books and documents came after the revolution of 1917 from the former estates of local nobles, local churches and monasteries.

Today, the library's collection contains a significant body of publications of the 19th to 21st centuries on issues of national history, history and theory of art and architecture, publications of historical sources, catalogues of museum collections, reference books. Here is stored the most complete collection of local history publications about Rostov and Rostov land. Among the valuable and rare books there are more than 1000 books with autographs of famous figures of the 19th and 20th centuries.

=== Department of Modern History and Geoinformation Systems ===
Department of Modern History and Geoinformation Systems - scientific division of the State Museum-Reserve "Rostov Kremlin". Employees of the department study museum collections, topics related to the history and culture of Rostov and Rostov land, make historical references, participate in scientific and practical conferences, publish the results of their research, replenish the databases of the Integrated Automated Museum Information System (KAMIS) and the Geographical Information System (GIS) "Rostov Land»

== Branches ==
=== The House of the Peasant Elkin ===
The museum in Borisoglebsky Sloboda (modern name – the settlement of Borisoglebsky) appeared as a branch of the Rostov State Museum in 1927. The expositions were opened on 8 November 1928. The establishment of a branch of the museum here was caused by the transfer of the architectural ensemble of the Rostov Borisoglebsky Monastery (buildings of the 16th to 18th centuries) to the Rostov Museum in 1924.

By 2014 the museum was removed from the walls of the monastery, which was returned to the church. To accommodate the branch, the museum has received a building of the 19th century, the so-called House of the peasant Elkin. This two-story building in the former Podbornoe settlement belonged to the local wealthy peasant Elkin.

In 2013–2015, the house underwent a comprehensive restoration. The museumification of the building is based on the stages of its history: its existence as a dwelling house of a peasant-farmer, industrialist, merchant and philanthropist.

In the Borisoglebsky Branch, the house of the peasant Elkin, a completely new type of museum is being created, focused on the interests and needs of the local population. To this end, it implements the project "My Museum – my history" and operates the club "Apple Pie".

=== Church of St. John the Evangelist on the Ishna River ===
The Church of St. John the Evangelist (1687) is located in the village Bogoslov, three kilometers to the southwest of Rostov, near the Ishna River. This is the only ancient wooden church in the Yaroslavl region and one of the few in the center of Russia.

The building has two floors: the first (basement) is intended for household use, the second is the church itself. In the 19th century, the existing bell tower was added to the church from the west, the southern part of the gallery was dismantled, the northern and western galleries were supported by brick pillars, the church was sheathed with planks.

Inside the church, on the sides of the solea, there are choir stalls decorated with carvings. There are wall painted fragments of the original iconostasis and carved gilded Tsar's gate made in 1883–1884 by V. L. Nikolsky - a copy of the Tsar's gate of 1562.

=== Museum of Rostov Merchants ===
One of the preserved city merchant estates is situated in the house No. 32 on Leninskaya Street of Rostov. Its complex was formed from the end of the 18th to the beginning of the 20th century: the main residential building and buildings for household services were built and completed. From 1835 to 1917, the estate belonged to different generations of the merchants Kekin's family, after the October Revolution it was nationalized, and housed an agricultural technical school.

In 1999, the main house of the estate was transferred to the State Museum-Reserve "Rostov Kremlin". Until 2008, large-scale restoration works were carried out. On August 29, 2008, the exhibition "Kekin - kin, fate, heritage", which tells about the history and culture of the Rostov merchants, the genealogy of local merchant families.

The interiors of the house were recreated: the living room, boudoir, dining room, study; within the exhibition the authentic objects, documents, picturesque portraits and photographs of representatives of the Kekin family are presented. The exhibits characterize the everyday life, commercial and social activities, spiritual and material culture of merchants. An important place in the exhibition is occupied by the theme of a major philanthropist and public figure of Alexey Leontievich Kekin (1838–1897).

=== Museum Children's Center ===
The Museum Children's Center is located in house 56 on Okruzhnaya Street in Rostov - this is an old city mansion – house of Rostov merchants Koperins.

== See also ==
- Rostov, Yaroslavl Oblast
- Yaroslavl Oblast
- Holy Mary mountain
