= Holy Mary mountain =

Holy Mary Mountain
- Гора Святой Марии (Russian)
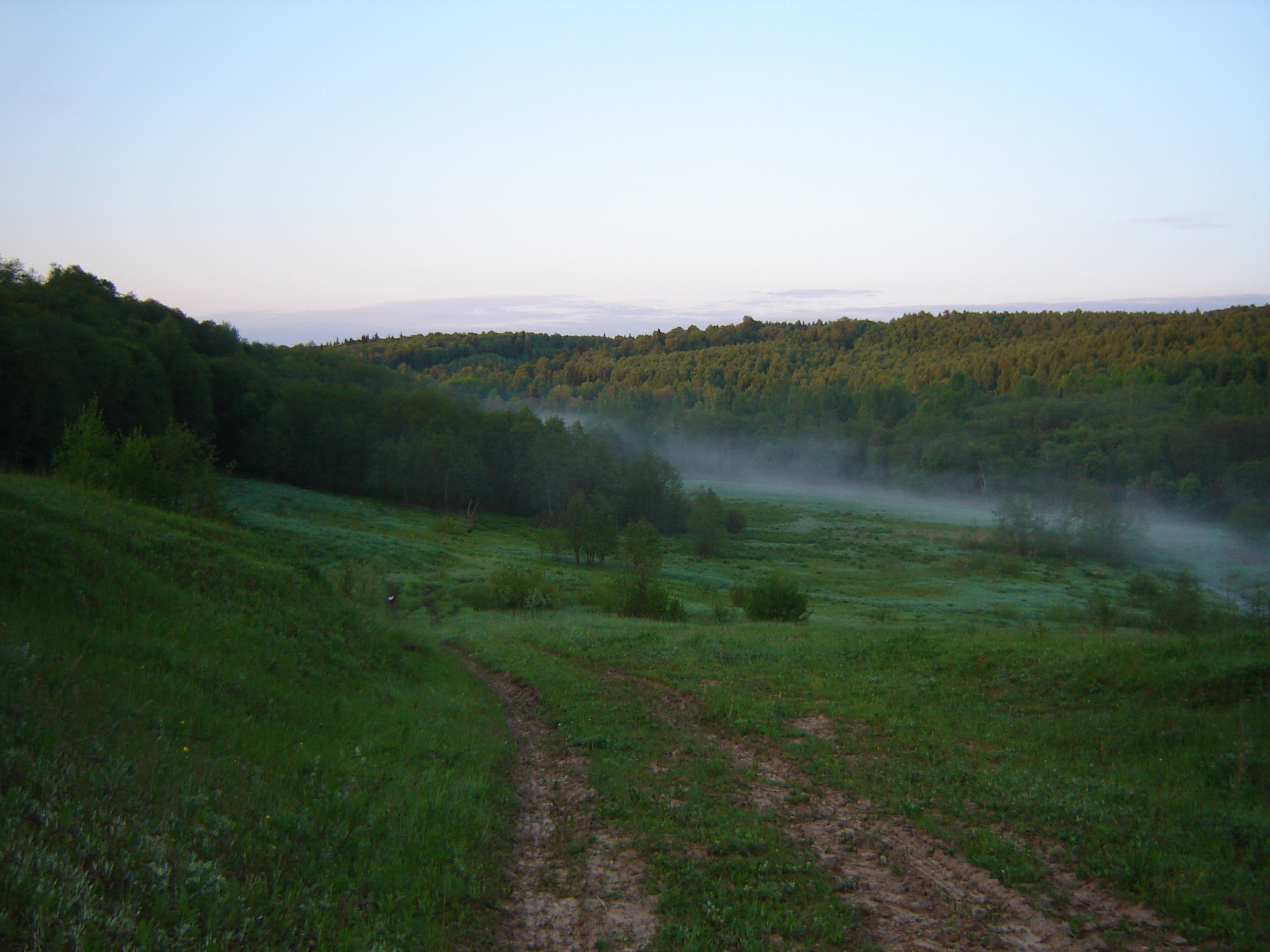
- Interactive map of Holy Mary Mountain
- 57°0′7″N 38°54′13″E
- Location: Russia, Rostov District of Yaroslavl Oblast, Filimonovo village, Petrovskoye settlement

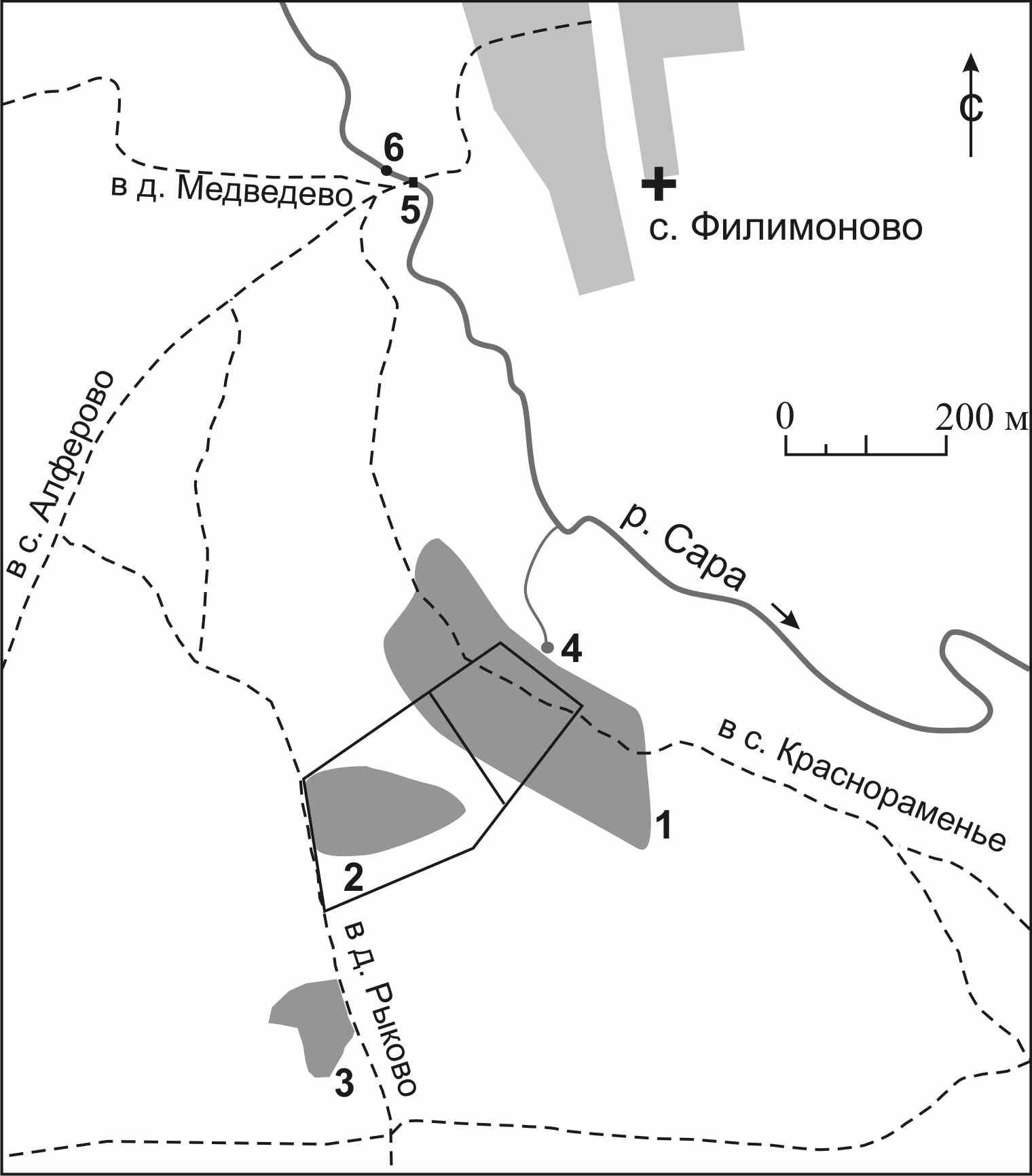
1. Village (Selishche) 2. Fortification (Gorodishche) 3. Mounds 4. Well 5. Roads 6. Ford

Holy Mary mountain, (Russian: Гора Святой Марии), is a landmark, in the neighborhood of Rostov Veliky, an object of cultural heritage of the Russian Federation, a collection of natural and cultural monuments. It is located near the village of Filimonovo in the Petrovskoye settlement of the Rostovsky District of the Yaroslavl Oblast, Russia. The area is situated on the bank of the Sara river. It includes archaeological sites: a medieval settlement (gorodishche) with a cemetery, a burial mound, and the sites of ancient settlements (selishche).

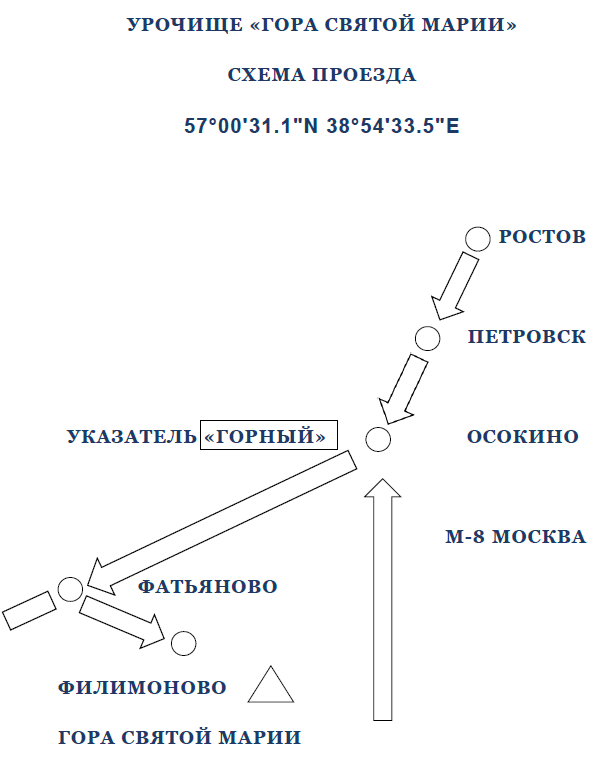
Location map of the tract of Holy Mary mountain. The ecological trail begins at the active Bogolyubskaya Church in the Filimonovo village

The archaeological sites are complemented by deciduous forests: oaks, maples, black alder, elms, and ash trees. Biologists have found representatives of flora and fauna listed in the IUCN Red List here.

== Chronicle mention ==
Holy Mary mountain was first mentioned in 1216, in the annalistic account of the Battle of Lipitsa.

"Then they equipped Vsevolod with a retinue and sent to Konstantin, and went down the Volga; and then they abandoned the wagons, got on horses and went to Pereyaslavl, fighting. When they were at the Gorodishche on the Sara river at the church of Holy Mary on Easter, April 9, Prince Constantine with the Rostovites came to them. And they rejoiced at the meeting, and kissed the cross, and sent Vladimir of Pskov with his retinue to Rostov, and they, coming on St. Thomas Week with their regiments, stood opposite Pereyaslavl".

== Church land ==
The tract was deserted in the XVI-XVII century and is mentioned in 1685 as

"Egyptian Mary church land of Pereslavl-Zalesskaya tithe, Konjutskiy camp, under the village Yudin, on the river Sara; Anton Vasiliev Beklemishev owns the land."

The well "Marya Svyataya" (Russian: "Мария Святая"), still honored by the locals, can be found at the foot of the mountain.

== Research by local historians ==
The first printed mention of Holy Mary mountain dates back to 1789:

"It is worthy of note, because in the dachas of this village beyond the river Saroya to Pereslavl Zalesky there is a rather high mountain, overgrown on the sides with different forests, and on top of it there is a level ground, on which in ancient times there was a nunnery".

Topographic maps of the XVIII, XIX and early XX centuries, contain boundaries of three plots with the names: "Marya svyataya", "Kolokolenka", "Popovka"; confirming the presence of a holy place here. Special attention to the tract was paid by a famous local historian of Rostov land — Titov Andrei Alexandrovich:

"Three versts from the village of Krasnoramenye there is a steep and very high mountain, overgrown with forest; it lies by the river Sara. The view from the mountain is charming; the mountain is known throughout the district under the name of 'Mount St. Mary's Mountain' and there are traces of burial mounds on it. A folk legend says that there was a Monastery of Holy Mary on this mountain, which the enemies burned down, and now there are traces of buildings in this place. Down between the mountain and the Sara River is the so-called Holy Well, however, very shallow, which, according to local legend, was formed by the fall of a large bell during the defeat of the monastery itself. In general, this mountain requires thorough research, which can shed new light on this undoubtedly historical area".

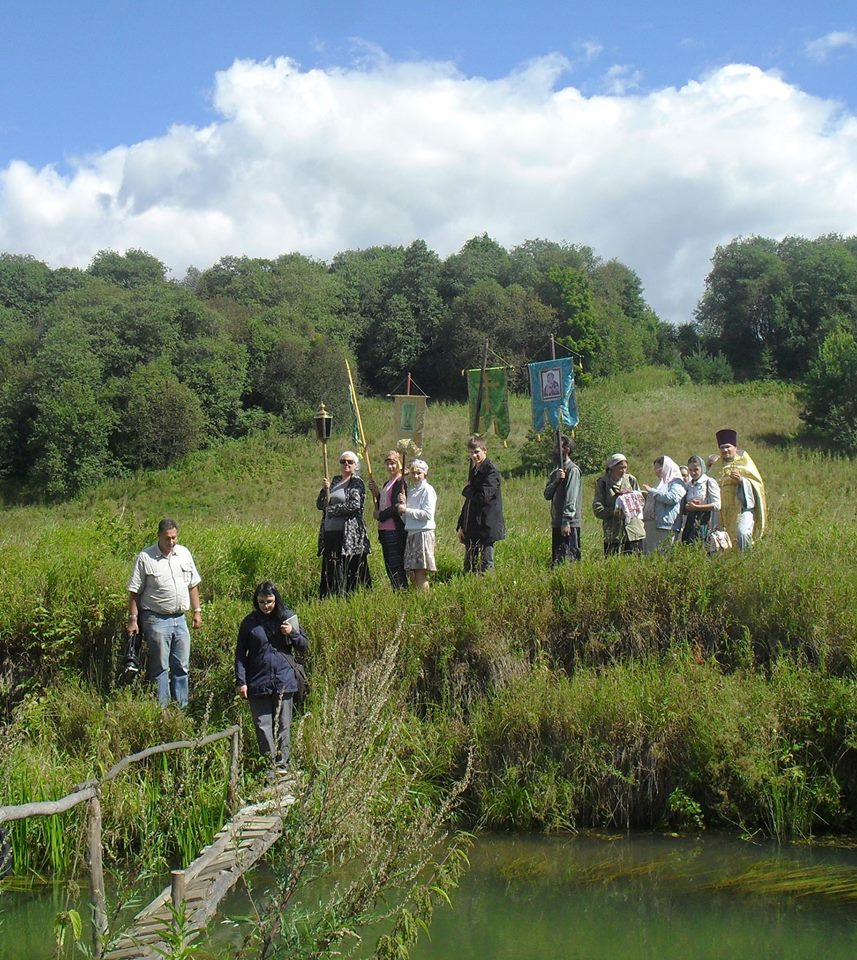
On the Sara River

== Modern research ==
In the XX century, archaeological scientists D. A. Ushakov, A. E. Leontiev, and K. I. Komarov visited Holy Mary mountain, conducting research, drawing up excavation plans, and putting archaeological monuments under protection. All of them noted the beauty of the place and its richness in cultural heritage. In the XXI century the staff of the Rostov Kremlin museum, A. L. Karetnikov, A. V. Kiselev, I. V. Kiselev. V. Kuptsov wrote several scientific articles based on field research.

== Damage to heritage ==
In 2004–2014, black diggers came to the tract, causing irreparable damage to ancient monuments. On August 29, 2014, the government of the Yaroslavl Oblast granted Nikitinsky Quarry LLC the right to use the subsoil area of the "Krasnokamenye" sand and gravel deposit in Rostovsky District for exploration and mining.

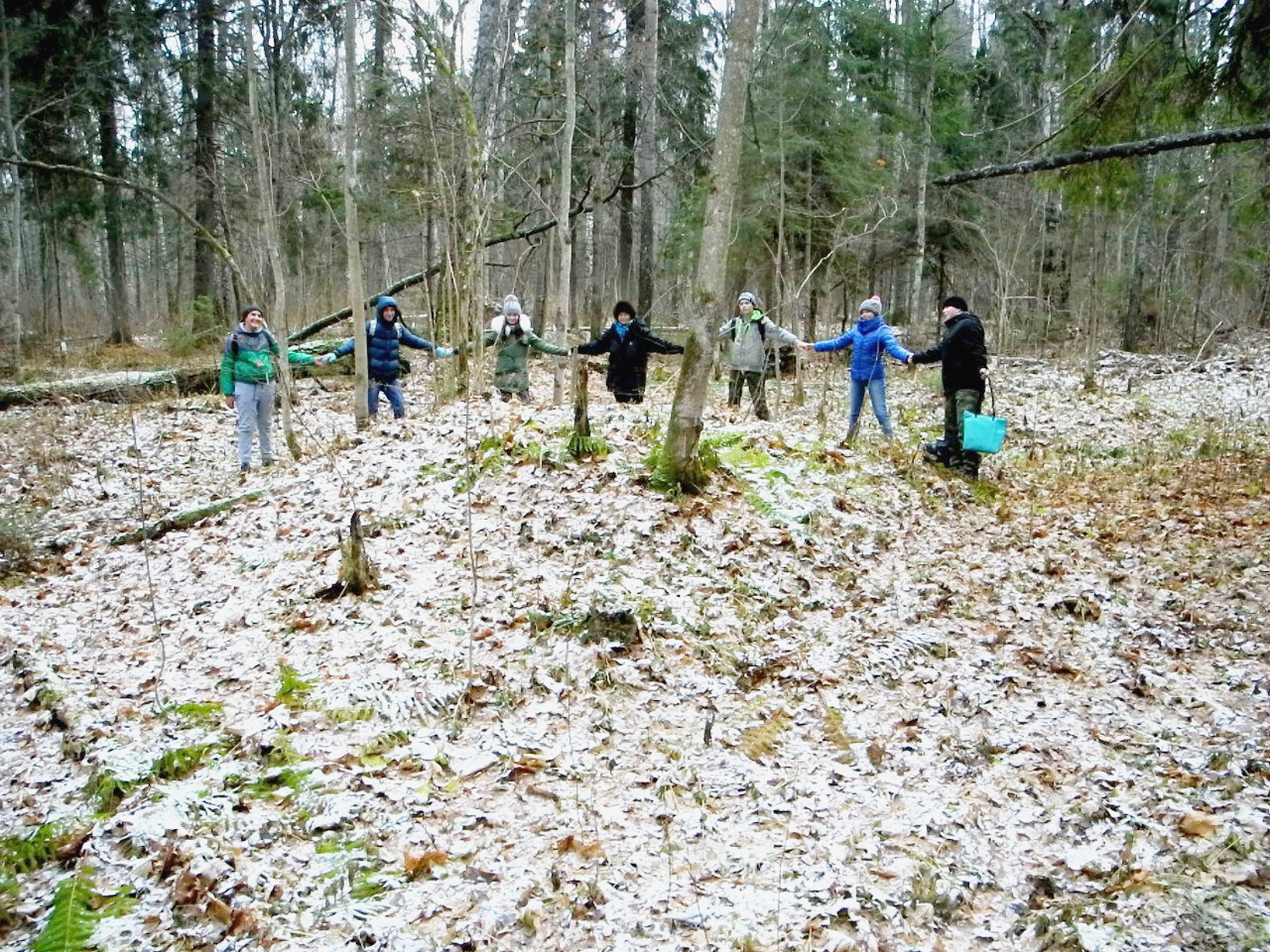
Around the mound

== Landmark ==
In 2015, the Yaroslavl Diocese of the Russian Orthodox Church applied to place a landmark site — the tract of "Holy Mary mountain" in the register of protected objects of cultural heritage. On September 21, the Department for State Protection of Cultural Heritage Objects issued an order to include "Holy Mary mountain" as the object with the attributes of a cultural heritage object in the list of identified cultural heritage objects.

== Excursions. Pilgrimages ==
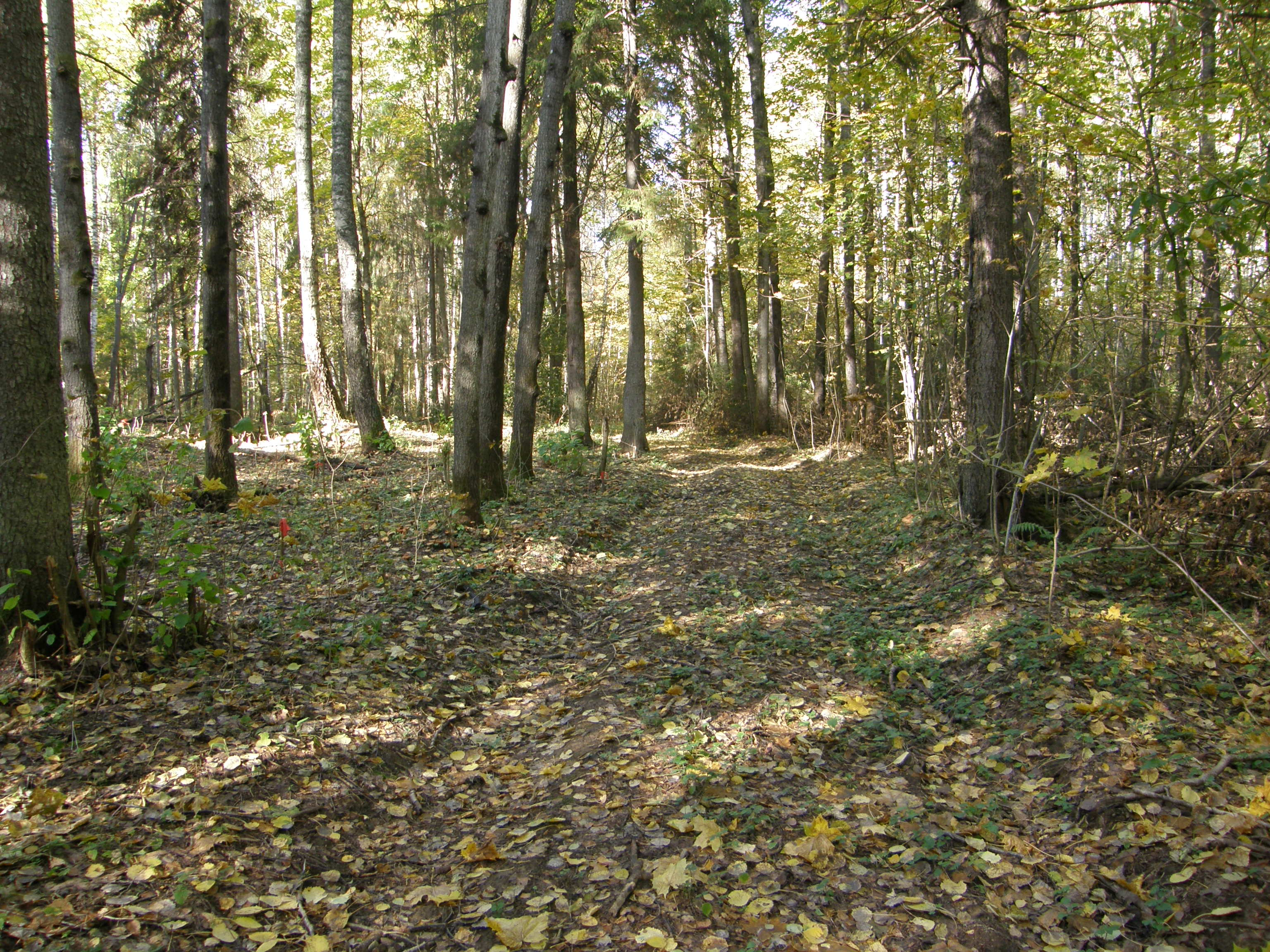
Forest Road

In the XXI century, the tract attracts tourists and pilgrims, and school excursions are organized here. During the community work days organized by the public in 2015, landscaping of the area began, signposts were installed along the road to Holy Mary mountain from the village of Filimonovo, and the bridges and access to the well "Marya Svyataya" were repaired. The most striking manifestation of the pilgrimage is the trek of the youth clubs of historical reconstruction "Pilgrimage to Holy Mary mountain". On January 18, 2019, at the foot of the mountain there was a Great Consecration of Water at spring 'Maryin'.

== See also ==
- Rostov, Yaroslavl Oblast
- Yaroslavl Oblast
- IUCN Red List

== Bibliography ==
- Каретников, А. Л. (2019). Урочище "Гора Святой Марии" в окрестностях Ростова Великого: итоги и перспективы междисциплинарных исследований. Материалы Всероссийского научно-практического семинара «Археолог и музей: диалог о вечном». Казань, 11-13 сентября 2019 г. Vol. 5. pp. 123–128.
