= Ishnya Church =

Coordinates: 57°10′49″N 39°21′15″E

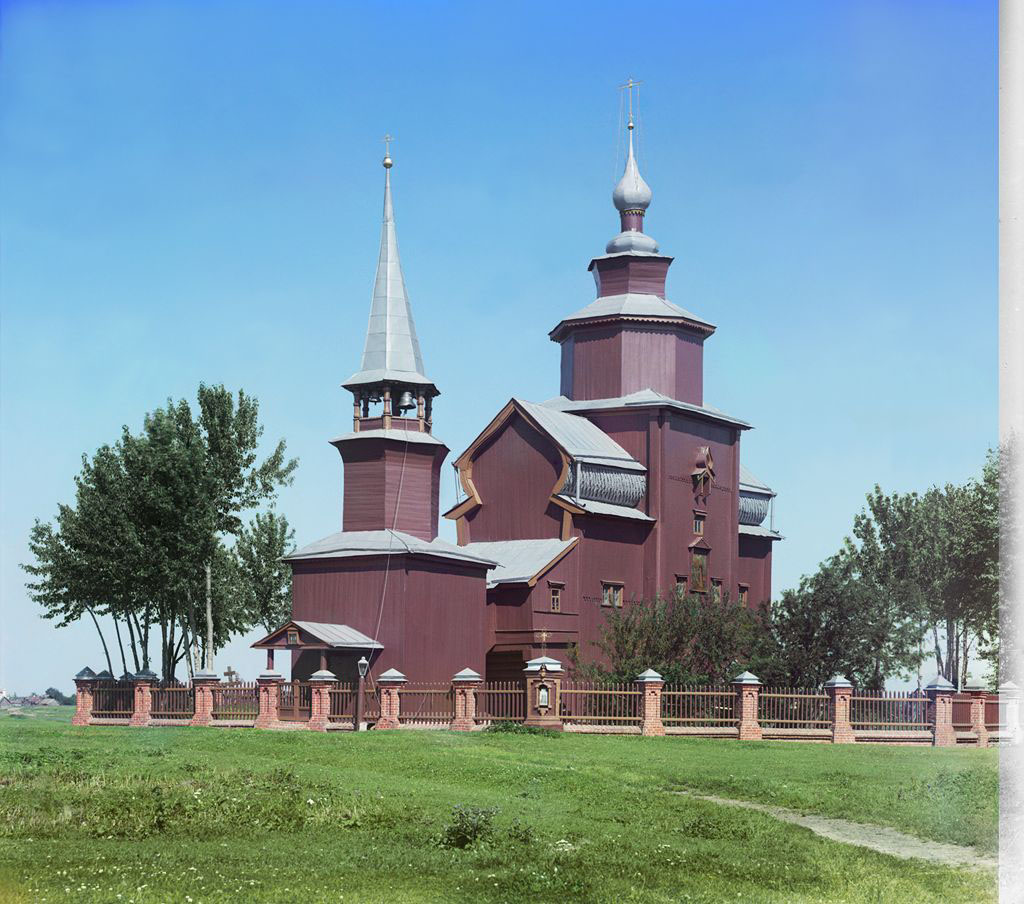
An early color photograph made by Prokudin-Gorskii in the summer of 1911

The Church of St. John the Theologian on the Ishnya River (церковь Иоанна Богослова на Ишне) is situated several miles west of Rostov, close to the Northern Mainline. It was built of wood in 1687 as a filial church of the Avraamiev Monastery marking the supposed place where the monastery's founder had met St. John the Theologian in the early 11th century.

The church is an octagon with porches crowned by distinctive bochka roofs and a steepled bell tower set in front of the main building. It is the oldest wooden building in Yaroslavl Oblast and is open as a museum from May to September.

In 1562 monk Isaiah from the Avraamiev Monastery carved the ornate royal doors that served as the main entrance to the altar. After the Russian Revolution, the church's original furnishings, including a set of old icons and the royal doors, were taken to the Rostov Kremlin museum and replaced with replicas. The original icon screen can be seen on Vereshchagin's 1888 painting in the Russian Museum.

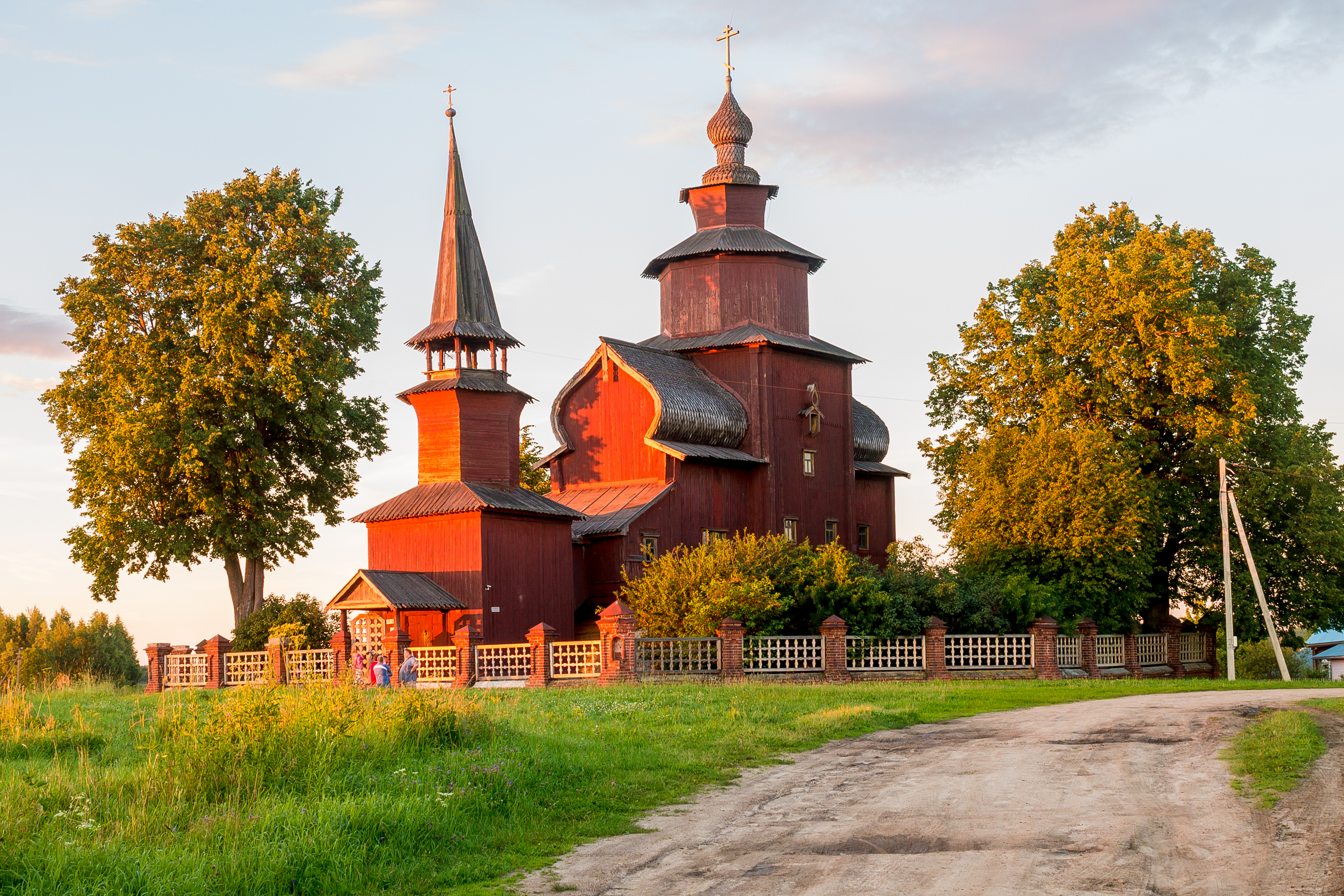
The church in 2017

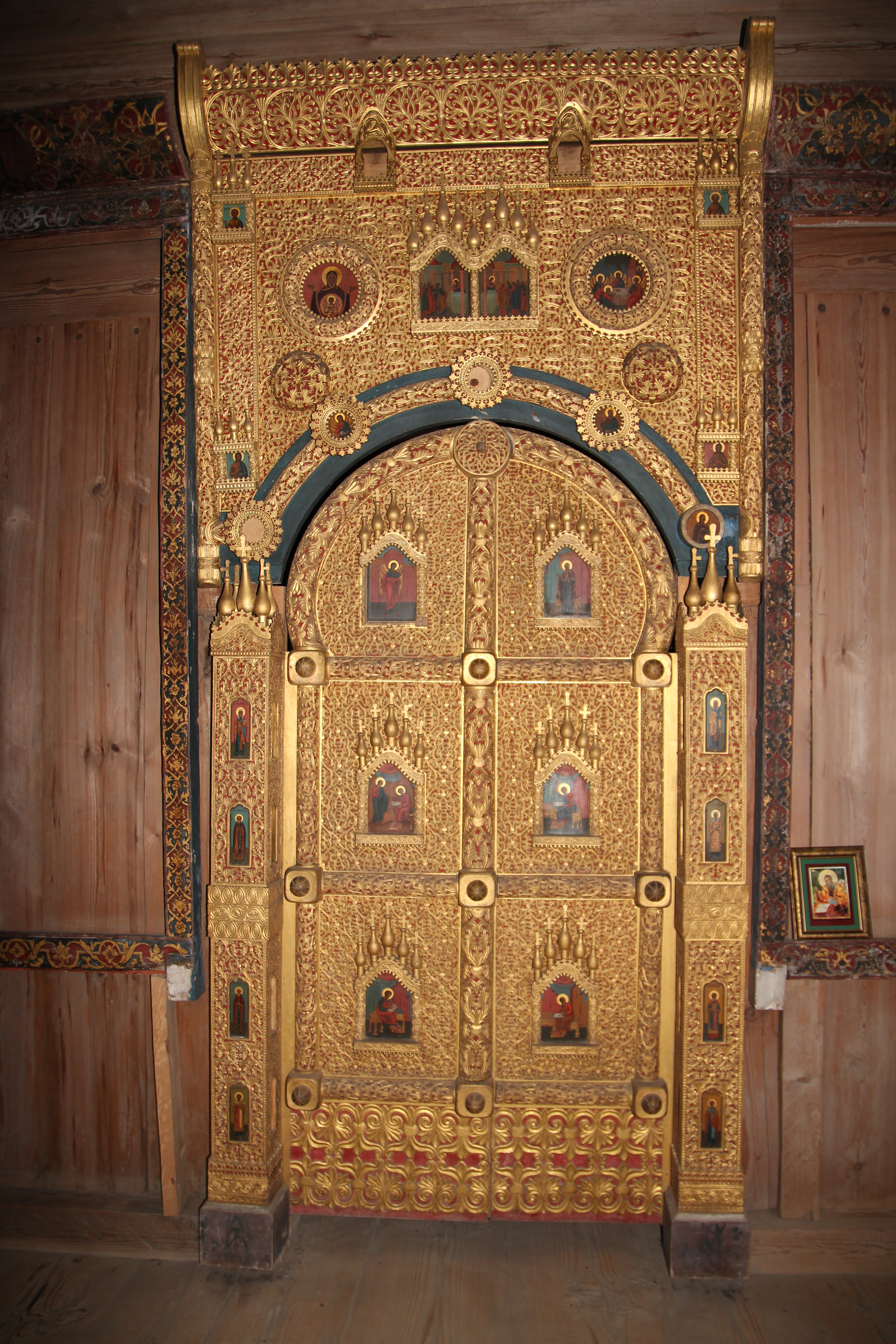
A copy of the royal doors, 2015

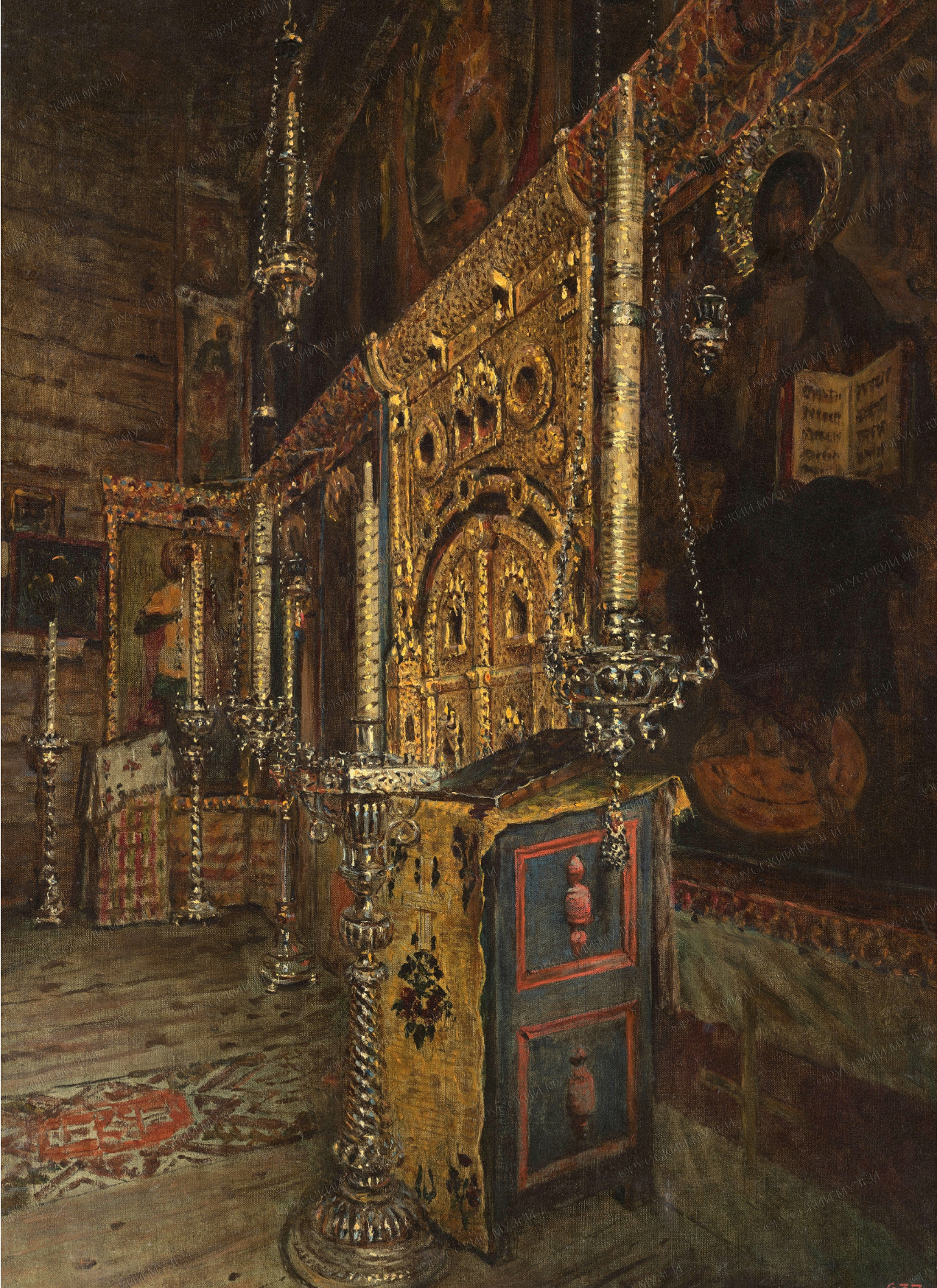
Vereshchagin's painting

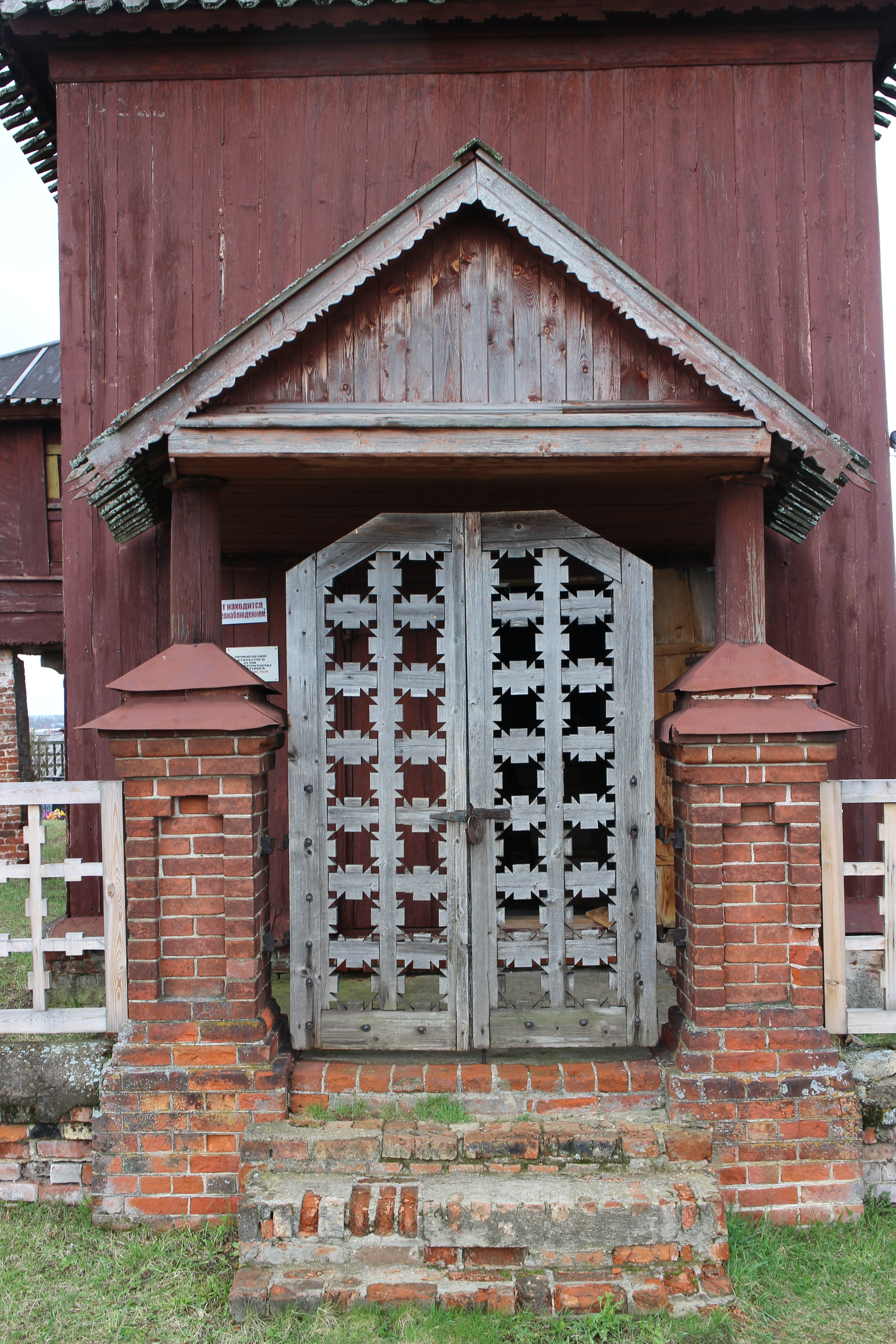
The wooden door

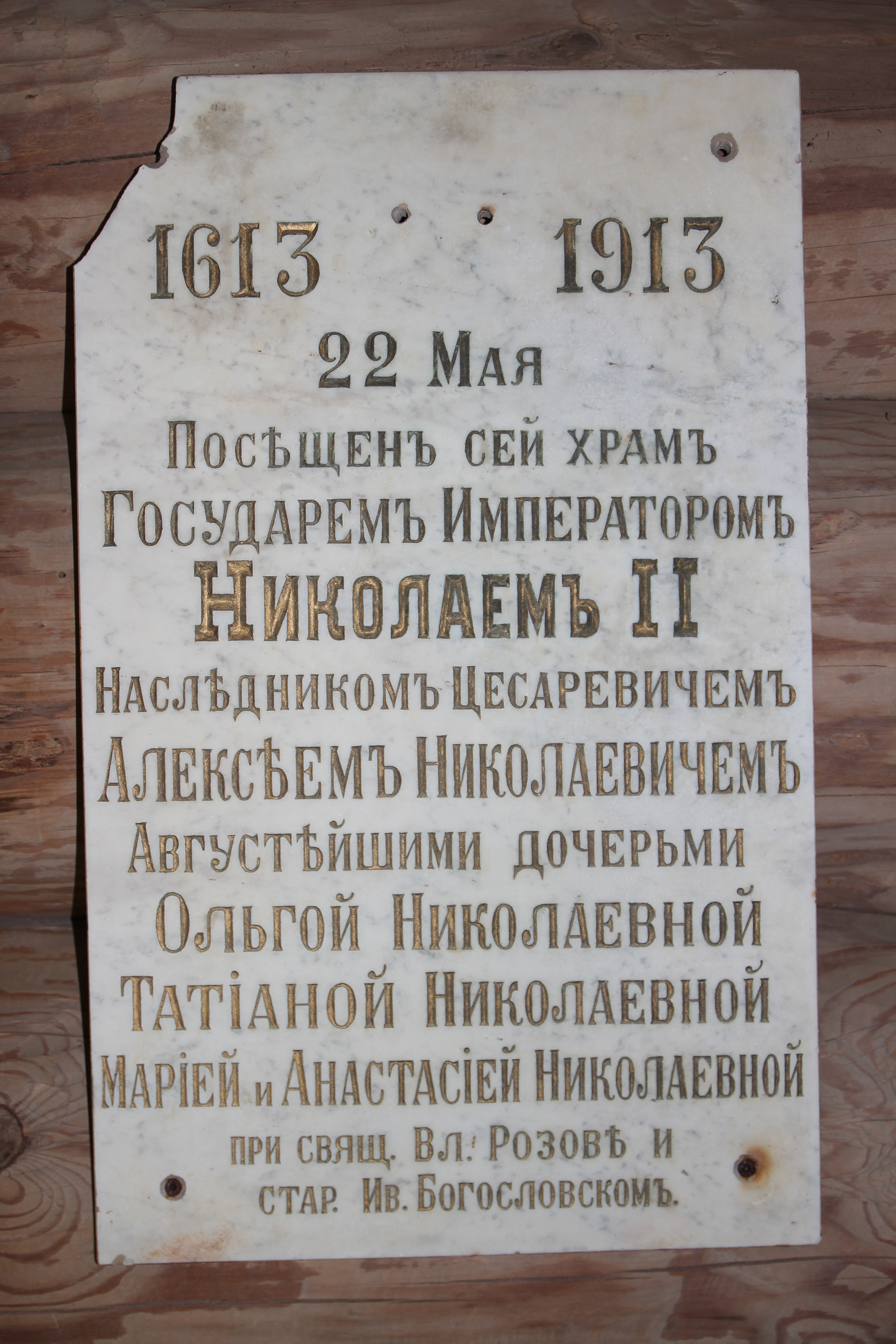
A plaque commemorating the 1913 visit by Nicholas II and his family
