= Rostov Kremlin =

- Ростовский кремль (Russian)
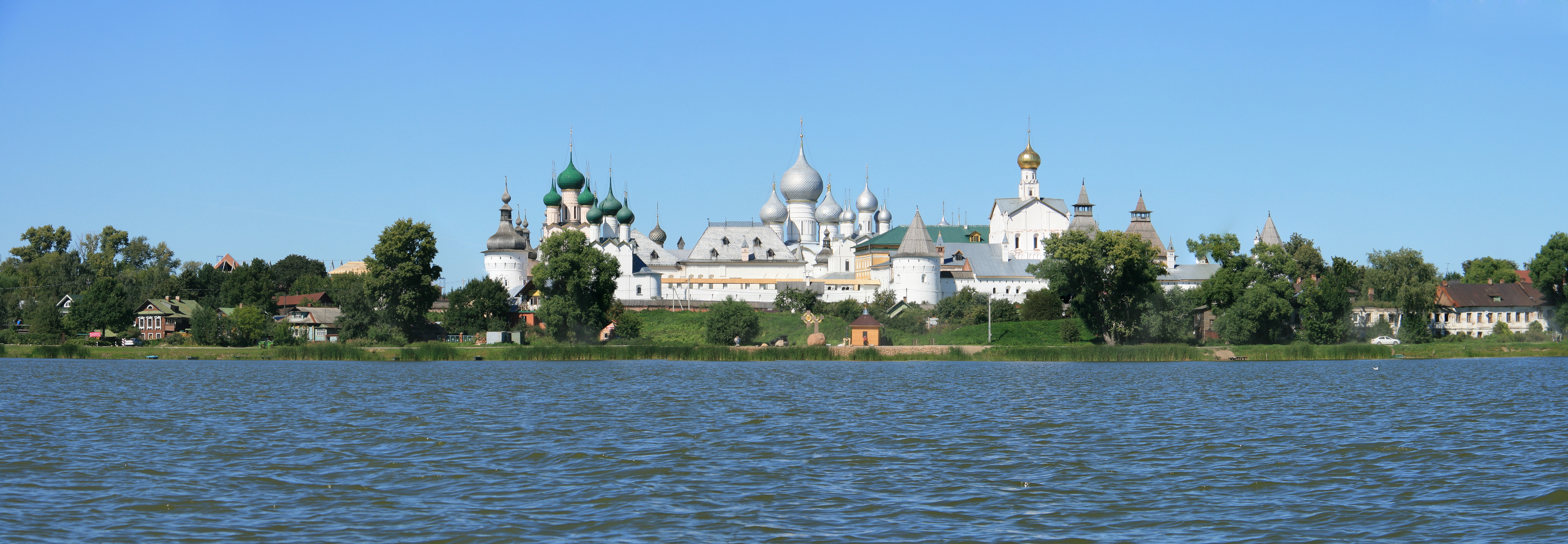
- General view of Rostov Kremlin from Nero Lake

- Location within Russia
- 57°11′58″N 39°25′29″E
- Location: Rostov, Yaroslavl Oblast, Russia

The Rostov Kremlin (Russian Ростовский кремль) is an architectural ensemble of four complexes, built during the 16th and 17th centuries in Rostov, Yaroslavl Oblast, Russia.

The Kremlin is located in the center of Rostov. According to its original purpose, the ensemble of the Rostov Kremlin was the residence of the Metropolitans, Metropolitan Bishop, of the Rostov diocese. According to experts it is one of the most significant and original architectural monuments in Russia.

The ensemble of the Kremlin consists of four special complexes: the Metropolitan's Court; the Cathedral Court; the Metropolitan Garden and the Stable Yard. The oldest building of the ensemble is the Rostov Assumption Cathedral (1508–1512). The architecture of all the churches of the Kremlin was determined by this monument. The Kremlin buildings, with a few exceptions, were built in the second half of the 17th century. It is important that the main part of the ensemble is built according to a single plan — a rare phenomenon in Russia at that time. This is what determined the exceptional architectural and artistic integrity of the Kremlin. Also because of the efforts of the museum specialists, the Kremlin has preserved outstanding monuments of Russian monumental painting of the 17th century.

Since 1998, the Rostov Kremlin has been included in the Tentative list of UNESCO World heritage objects.

== History ==
The main dominant of the ensemble is the Assumption Cathedral — the oldest building in the city. The Church was built in 1508–1512 on the site of its white-stone predecessors of the 12th-13th centuries. The gorgeous volume of the cathedral, covered by keel-shaped zakomars, is crowned by a powerful five-domed construction. The internal six-column structure of the building is revealed by pilasters of a large take-out on facades.

Most of the extant buildings of the Kremlin were built much later than the cathedral, mainly during the reign of Metropolitan Jonas Sysoevitch (1652–1690), who had a significant influence on the formation of the artistic appearance of these structures. Thus, according to his plan, around 1682, a belfry was built to the southeast of the cathedral. At the same time, Moscow masters Philip and Cyprian Andreev cast two huge bells for the belfry: "Polyeleine" in 1000 poods and "Swan" in 500 poods. Later, in 1688, the master Flor Terentyev cast a large bell of 2000 poods, named "Sysoy", in the memory of the father of Metropolitan Jonas. Especially for this bell an additional tower-like building was constructed and adjoined the Northern facade of the belfry. It has a complete set of 15 original bells.

The construction of the central part of the Kremlin ensemble began with the formation of the main courtyard, which was surrounded mainly by the religious and administrative buildings. One of the first buildings constructed here in the 1650s–1660s was the two-story edifice of the Judicial Office, which, in addition to judicial functions, was in many ways the center of the general administration of the diocese. Around 1670, the Church of the Resurrection with two flanking fortress towers on its Northern facade was constructed close to the Judicial Office building. This complex was designed main entrance to the Metropolitan courtyard — the Holy gate. The appearance of the Church of the Resurrection is also striking by the contrasting combination of the harsh, almost unadorned top of the temple with the lower part, which is abundantly decorated with various brick patterns, multicolored tiles, and a large picturesque kiot.

On the other side of the Central courtyard stands a large building of Metropolitan chambers, constructed under Metropolitan Jonas in about 1650s–early 1670s. From the very beginning, it was intended for the residence of the Metropolitan, as well as for the storage of his treasury. Part of the premises was occupied by the Exchequer, which oversaw all financial affairs of the diocese. Until the end of the 17th century the building remained two-story, in the 18th century, the third floor was added, and at the end of the same century it has received a new decor in the spirit of classicism. Now only the ornamental belt, typical for the second half of the 17th century, and the narrow windows of the first floor, restored by restorers in the 1920s, remind of the ancient appearance of the structure.

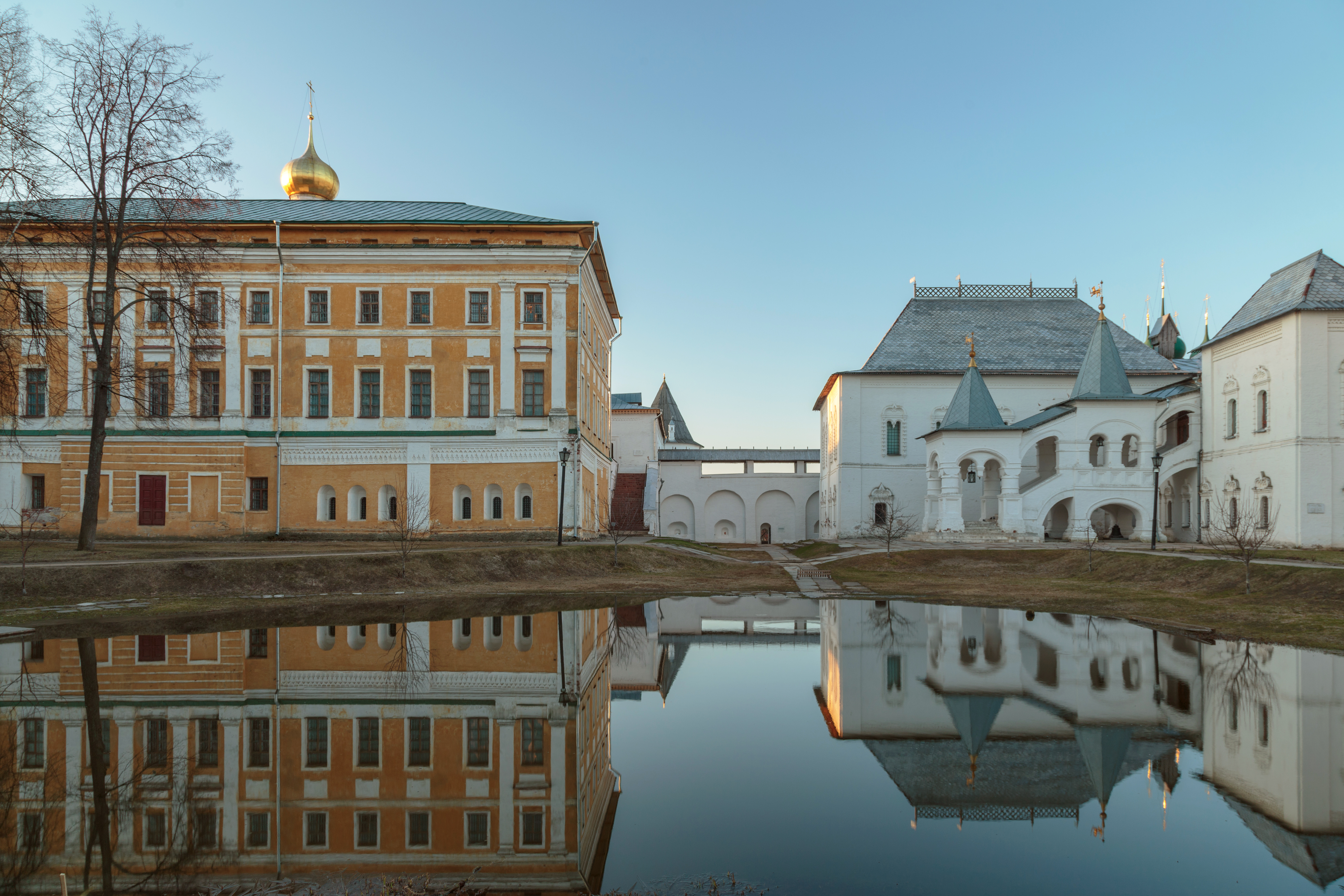
Metropolitan Chambers (on the left) and Red Chamber (on the right). Rostov Kremlin. 2018

There is a complex of the Royal Apartments or, as it is also called, the "Red Chamber", which were constructed in 1670–1680. The building has a picturesque layout of volumes, each of which is completed with a special steep roof. A magnificent porch topped with two tents gives even more picturesqueness to the Royal chambers.

The complex of the Church of the Saviour of the Holy Image (later, the Saviour by the Porch) was built behind the Metropolitan chambers around 1675. A bakery and the other administrative offices were situated on the ground floor, and at the first: the Church of the Saviour of the Porch, a large dining room, porch between them, and otdatochnye chambers (storage of kitchen utensils) which was adjacent to the Northern façade of the building and was dismantled in 1778. The Church of the Saviour was the home church of Metropolitan Jonas. Its slender volume, crowned with a gilded head on a drum of complicated shape, dominates the surrounding buildings.

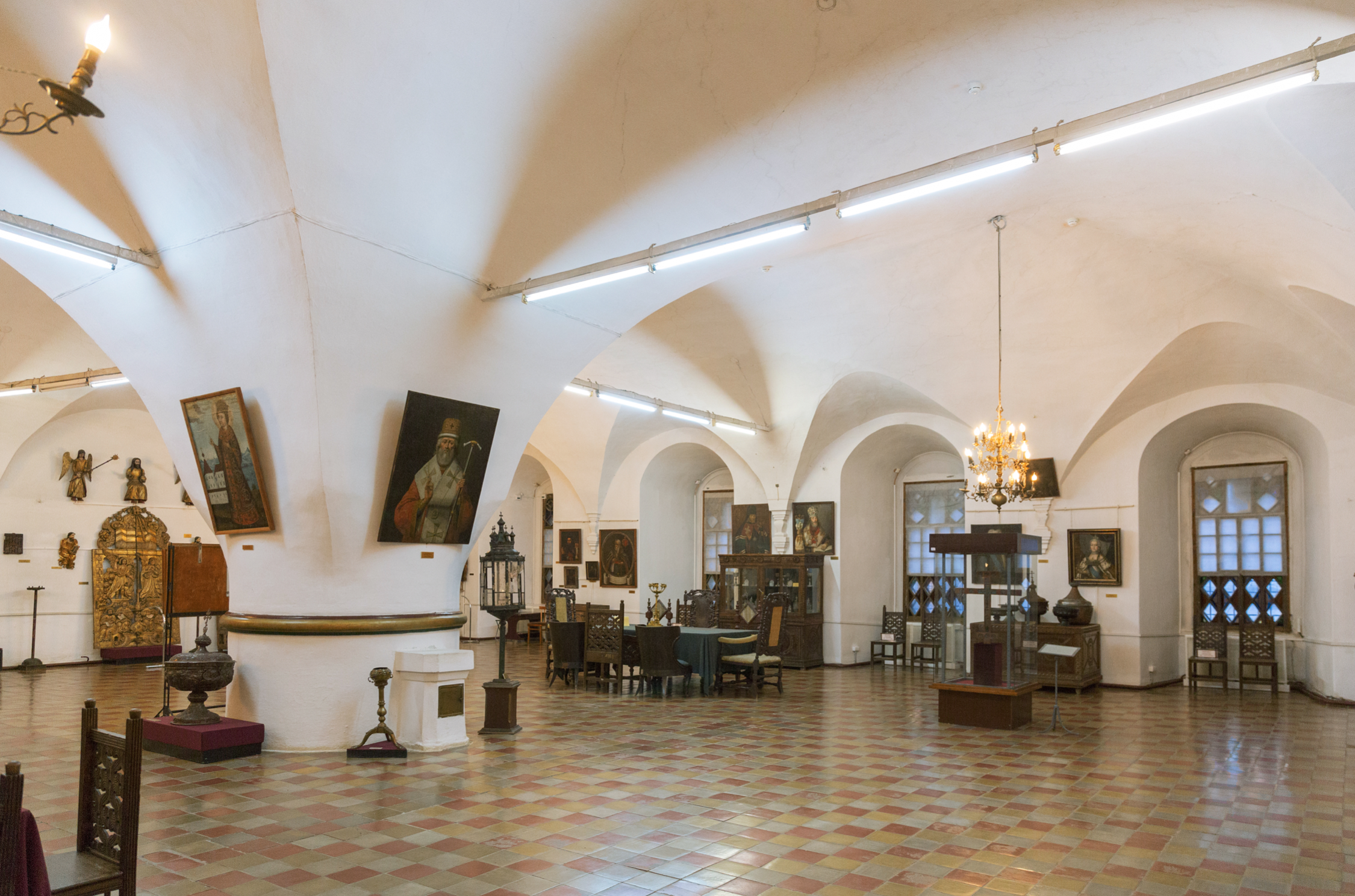
White Chamber. Rostov Kremlin. 2020

The Dining or White chamber has a traditional for the 16th-17th centuries single-column design. The interior is well lit by wide windows decorated with the so-called "hanging stone". Here, Metropolitan Jonas has arranged a festive meal.

During the 1670s–1680s, the fortress walls and towers of the Metropolitan residence were built. The masters provided them with all the attributes of a fortress structure the loopholes of the plantar, oblique, and upper battle. However, the richness of the decorative decoration of the towers, which, like ordinary chambers, have wide windows with platbands, indicate that the fortress from the very beginning had no military significance. Undoubtedly, it was intended to demonstrate the greatness of the Rostov diocese, one of the largest in Russia. At the same time different buildings of the household yard were constructed. Storerooms, brewery, and drying room were housed in buildings situated between the Watery and Wood-burning Towers. And on the other side of the Wood-burning Tower – kitchen and pastry shop. The architectural decoration of all these structures is very modest. Thus the hierarchically subordinate position of household buildings in the overall artistic whole of the ensemble was emphasized.

One of the last Kremlin buildings of the time of Metropolitan Jonas was the gate church of John the Theologian (1683). This is perhaps the most perfect work of the Ionian masters. All the best of the experience gained during the years of construction of the metropolitan residence, found a brilliant embodiment in this wonderful monument. The Church of St. John the Theologian looks more elegant and festive than the churches of the Kremlin that preceded it. There is no longer a contrast between the richly decorated bottom and the severe, almost ascetic top of the temple in its appearance.

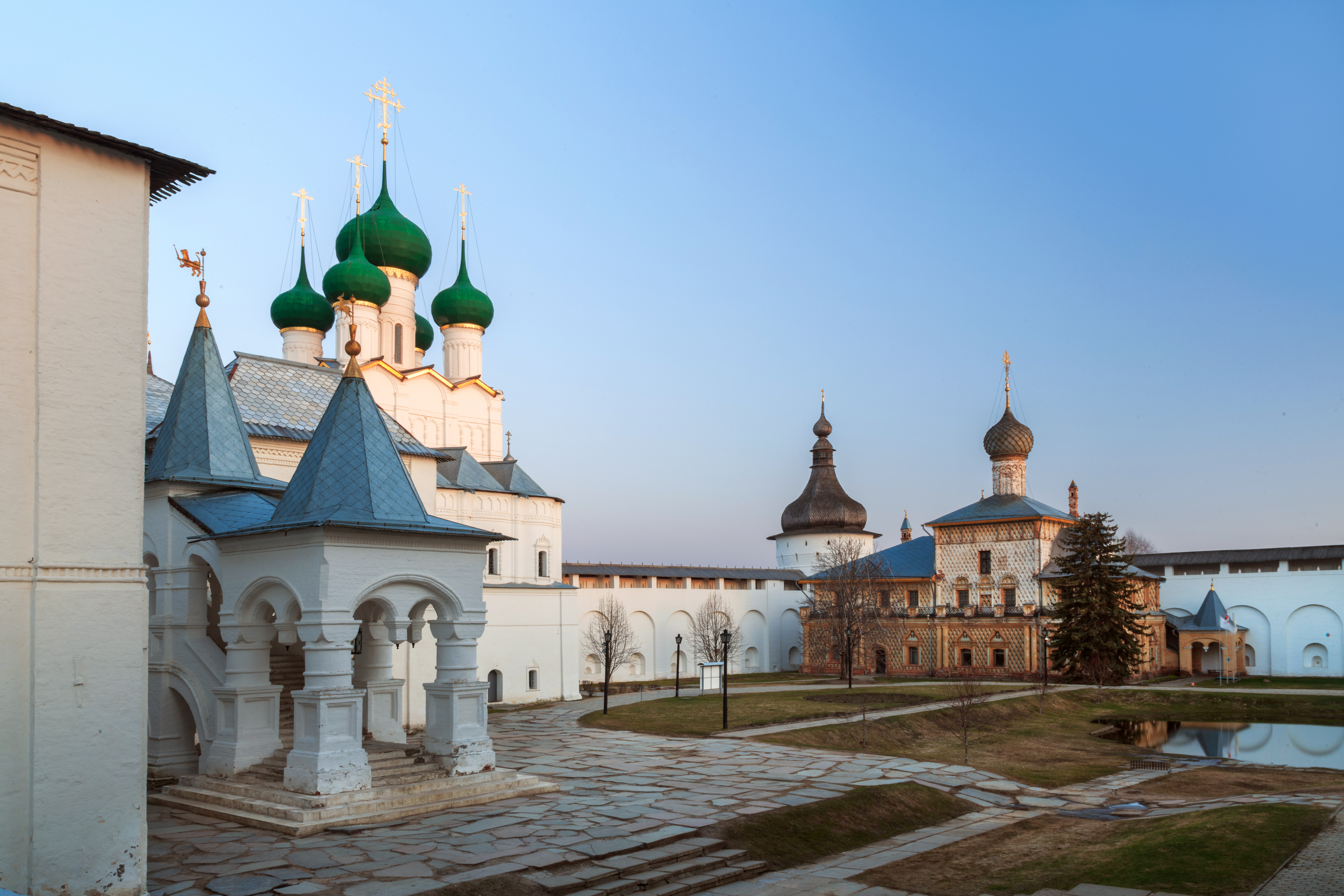
Red Chamber (on the left), Church of St. John the Divine and Church of Odigitria (on the right), Rostov Kremlin. 2018

A completely different architectural treatment has the Church of Gregory the Theologian (1680s), which is a part of the Grigoriev Monastery, that was attributed or completely dependent on the Metropolitan. At first glance, the Church of Gregory the Theologian with its multi-pitched completion and five-domed structure is close to other Kremlin churches. But there are no either an arcature-columnar belt, or a tile one, or rich platbands in its decoration. That had to underline the ascetic essence of the monastery life.

The last independent building of the Rostov Kremlin was the Church of Hodigitria, which construction has started in 1692 and was completed in 1693. It has received the features of the "Moscow Baroque" style, which was widespread in the late 17th-early 18th centuries. But unlike most of the buildings in this architectural trend, the Church of Hodigitria looks much more modest. The masters did everything to harmoniously fit it into the already established ensemble.

At the end of the 17th century, the large Stable Yard was built for the Metropolitan residence, which included residential and domestic sections as well as stalls for the horses. This is the earliest surviving Russian building of this kind.

So, by the end of the 17th century, the formation of the Bishop's court was almost completed. All its various structures were combined in a rare picturesque, but at the same time surprisingly harmonious ensemble. The unity and noble restraint of the color scheme gave it a special spirituality. White with a slightly pinkish tinge color of the stone walls was peculiarly combined with the silvery, almost black color of the plank roofs and the dull luster of the tinned coating of the heads and crosses. The picture was completed by a magnificent garden laid out in the central courtyard with a wide pond, which resembled a garden of paradise. And the ensemble as a whole, according to the plan of Metropolitan Jonas, was supposed to remind the "pure river of life" which proceeded out of the throne of God and of the Lamb" (Rev. 22.1) in the heavenly city, and the apple trees of the "tree of life, which bare twelve manner of fruits, and yielded her fruit every month" (Rev. 22. 2).

On the south to the central part of the Rostov Kremlin, the Metropolitan garden is situated. Initially, it was an integral part of the Metropolitan residence. it was built under Metropolitan Jonas, at the end of the 17th century, when the formation of the Rostov Kremlin ensemble was completed. The inventory of 1701 shows that the garden had "a length of fifty-five fathoms, a length of three hundred fathoms, and in it trees of Apple, pear, cherry, and other garden trees".

Several changes took place in the appearance of the Kremlin over the next three centuries. In 1754, new Holy Gate was built in the outer wall near the Assumption Cathedral in the place of the old one. At approximately the same time most of the Kremlin towers acquired elaborately shaped Baroque spires instead of the earlier tent-shaped ones. At the end of the 18th century, the Metropolitan Chambers were rebuilt in the classical style.

In 1787, the decision to move the Episcopal see from Rostov to Yaroslavl was made, and the Rostov Metropolitan residence lost its function, was left without attention, and gradually became dilapidated. The buildings of the ensemble were occupied by various departments as warehouses and there were no services in the temples of the ensemble. In the first part of the 19th century, the upper tier of the Сlock Tower was demolished. In the 19th and early 20th century, trading booths were set up by the outer wall near the Assumption Cathedral.

However, thanks to the enlightened Rostov merchants, the architectural complex was restored at their expense in the 1860s and 1880s. On the initiative of A. A. Titov and I. A. Shlyakov, the Rostov Museum of Church antiquities was opened in the White chamber of the Kremlin in October 1883. In 1886, the Kremlin was taken under its patronage by the heir to the Imperial throne, the future Emperor Nicholas II. In 1910, the State Duma legislated the all-Russian status of the Museum, deciding to release money from the Treasury for its maintenance.

In 1953, many monuments of the ensemble were damaged because of a tornado. Emergency restoration work of individual objects of the Rostov Kremlin turned into a scientific restoration to recreate the original appearance of the entire ensemble. The work was supervised by the outstanding restorer V. S. Banige, who arrived in Rostov almost immediately after the tornado. In 1957, restoration work was completed on most of the sites. As the result most of the monuments regained something very closely to their original appearance.

Since 1960, Rostov Kremlin became one of the key attractions of the tourist route through the ancient Russian cities of Central Russia "Golden ring".

In the late 1990s, the garden was reconstructed. Its cross-shaped layout and species composition corresponds to the Metropolitan garden of the end of the 17th century. This is the only reconstructed medieval garden of the Bishop's residence in Russia. In the Northern part of the garden, a Bosket marks the plan of the cell building of the Grigoriev monastery that existed here in ancient times. the remains of this building were discovered by archaeologists.

== Rostov Kremlin architectural ensemble ==
The Rostov Kremlin ensemble consists of the following architectural elements:

- Assumption cathedral (1508–1512)
- Assumption cathedral belfry (around 1682, around 1689)
- Judicial Office [Sudnyj Prikaz] (1650s–1660s)
- Gateway Church of the Resurrection (around 1670)
- Metropolitan Chambers (1650s–beginning 1670s)
- Royal Apartments (1670s–1680s)
- Church of the Mandilion (Church of our Saviour-by-the Porch) (around 1675)
- White Chamber (around 1675)
- Gateway Church of St. John the Theologian (around 1683)
- Church of St. Gregory the Theologian (1680s)
- Domestic Courtyard (1670s–1680s)
- Stable Yard (end of the 17th century)
- Church of Hodegetria (1692–1693)
- House on the Cellars (1660–1680s, 1697–1698, middle of the 18th century)
- Fortress walls with five corner and two gate towers (1670s–1680s)
- Fence with two towers and the Metropolitan garden chamber (1680s–middle of the 18th century)
- Fence of the Cathedral square with the Holy gate (18th–19th century)

=== Assumption Cathedral ===
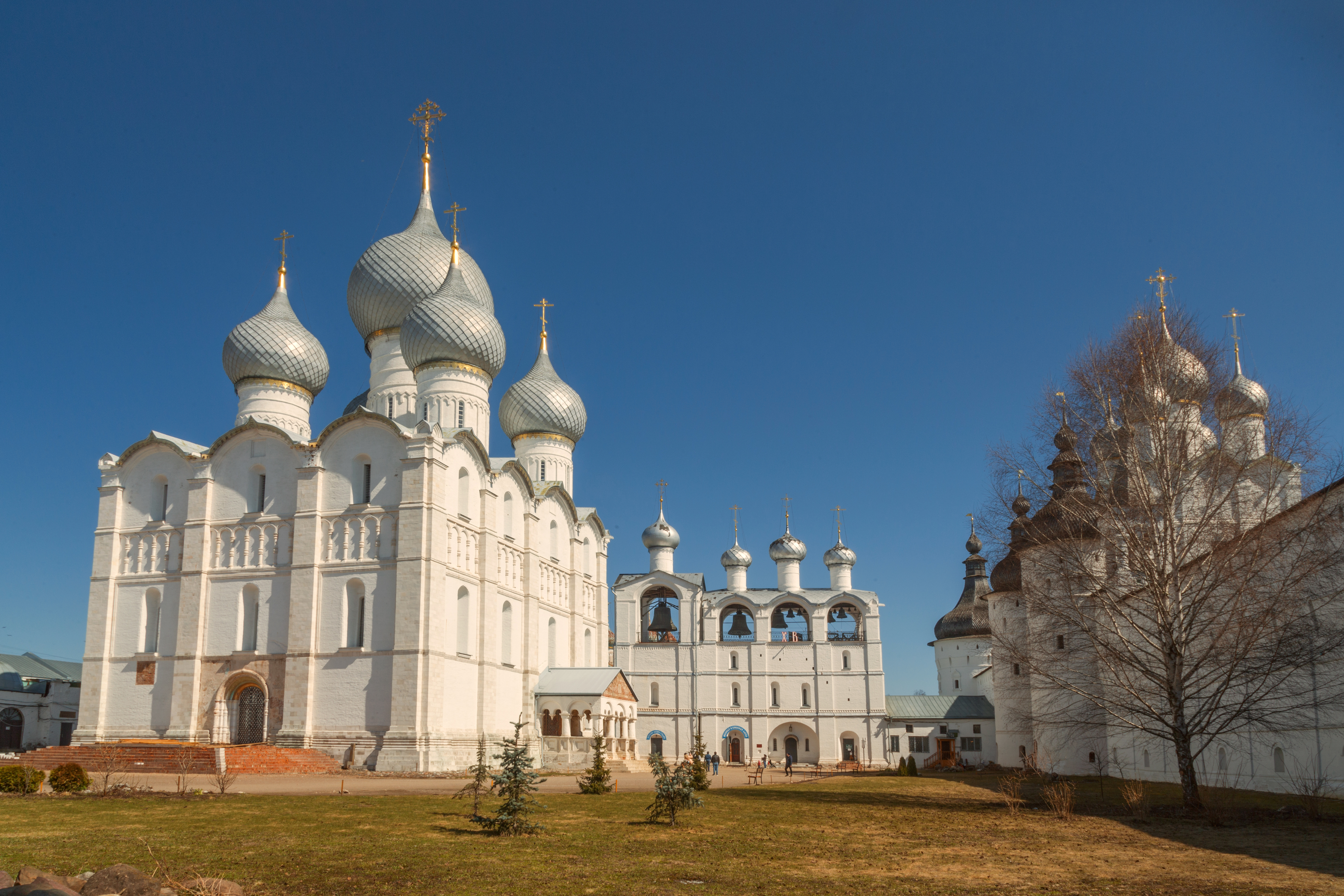
Assumption Cathedral, Rostov Kremlin, Russia. 2018.

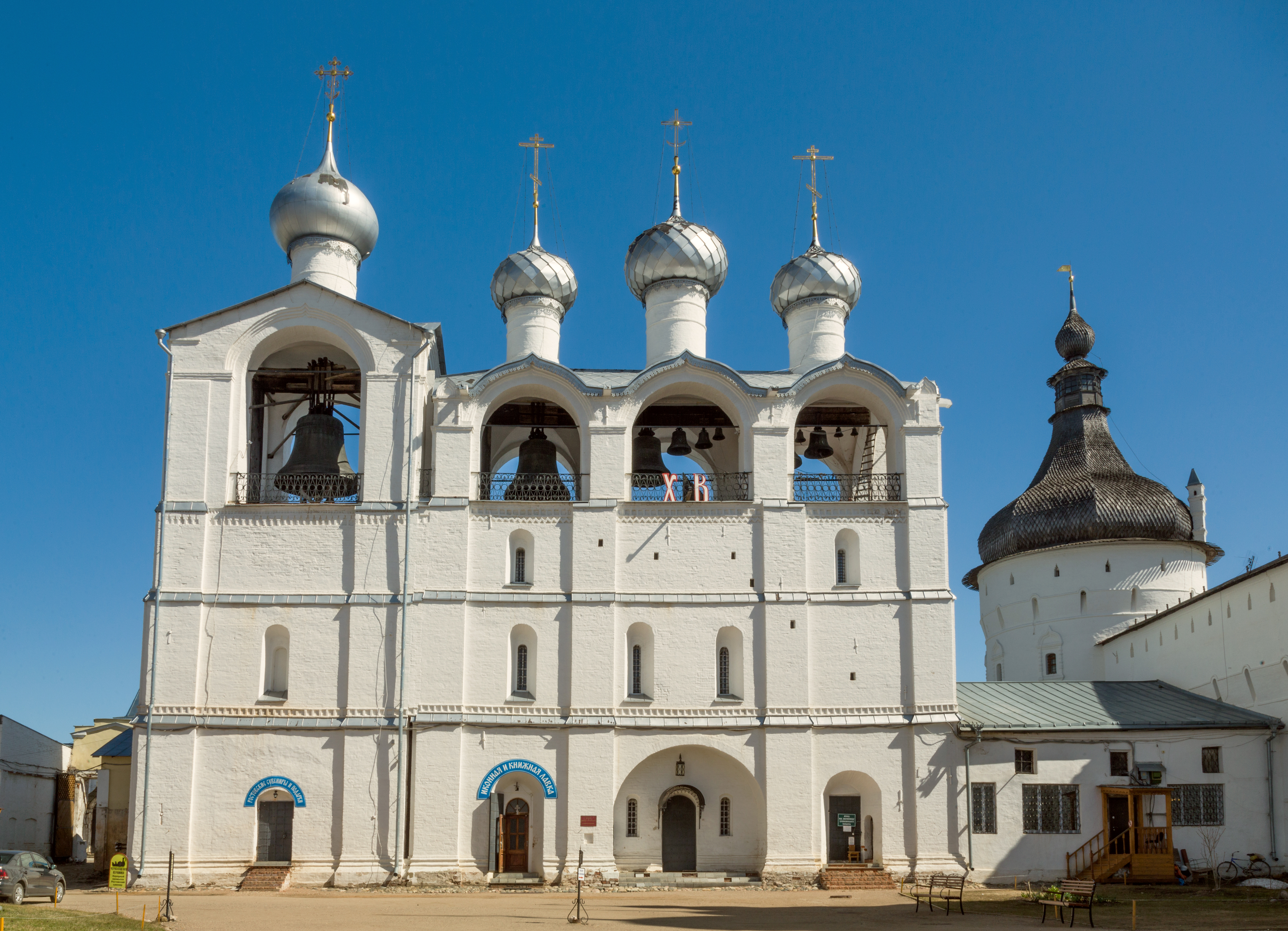
Assumption Cathedral Belfry, Rostov Kremlin, Russia. 2018

The present building was preceded by three churches. The first was built "of oak timbers" in 991, only after three years after the adoption of the Christianity in Kiev, it was the oldest Orthodox church of North-East Russia. A new one of White stone was erected on the site of the wooden cathedral in the 1160s, but destroyed in 1204.The next white-stone cathedral was built on the same foundation in 1213–1231.

The actual cathedral was erected in 1508–1512. It was the first large, six-columned church with a triple apse and live domes to be built in Russia in the 16th century outside Moscow. The walls and dome drums are made of brick, but most of the decorative relief details are of white stone. Crowning, the majestic main body are ogee-shaped zakomars and live domes, which were originally helmet-shaped. The six-columned interior arrangement is reflected on the facades in broad pilaster strips, which protrude strongly and therefore look particularly impressive. The facades are divided by cornices into four tiers.

Assumption cathedral was constructed by an Italian architect from Venice. Whereas the general composition of the cathedral follows the traditions of medieval Russian architecture, its decorative treatment clearly expresses features of late Venetian Gothic.

Originally the walls of the interior were painted "imitation brick". The cathedral did not acquire wall paintings until 1659. They were commissioned by Metropolitan Jonas of Rostov. The paintings were executed in 1670 and 1671. In 1843 paintings were covered with oil painting. The seventeenth century frescoes survived in part beneath this layer.

The cathedral's main iconostasis and pilar iconostases are replacements. They were executed in 1731–1740 in the Baroque style.

=== Assumption Cathedral Belfry ===
Around 1682 a belfry was constructed to the southeast of the cathedral. Facedes of the belfry were divided by pilaster strips and horizontal bands, and topped by ogee-shaped zakomars and pointed kokoshniks. The Church of the Entry of our Lord into Jerusalem was situated in the lower part of the building. The belfry's height and exterior ornament lend a remarkable unity and harmony to the ensemble of the Cathedral Court. The belfry has 15 bells and all of them appeared there in the days of the Metropolitan Jonas. Two enormous bells, "Polieleny" (1000 poods) and "Lebed"(Swan) (500 poods) were cast in 1682. Later, in 1688, the largest bell "Sysoi" (2000 poods) was made for the belfry. A special additional tower-shaped unit adjoining the belfry's north facade was erected for this bell.

=== Judicial Office ===
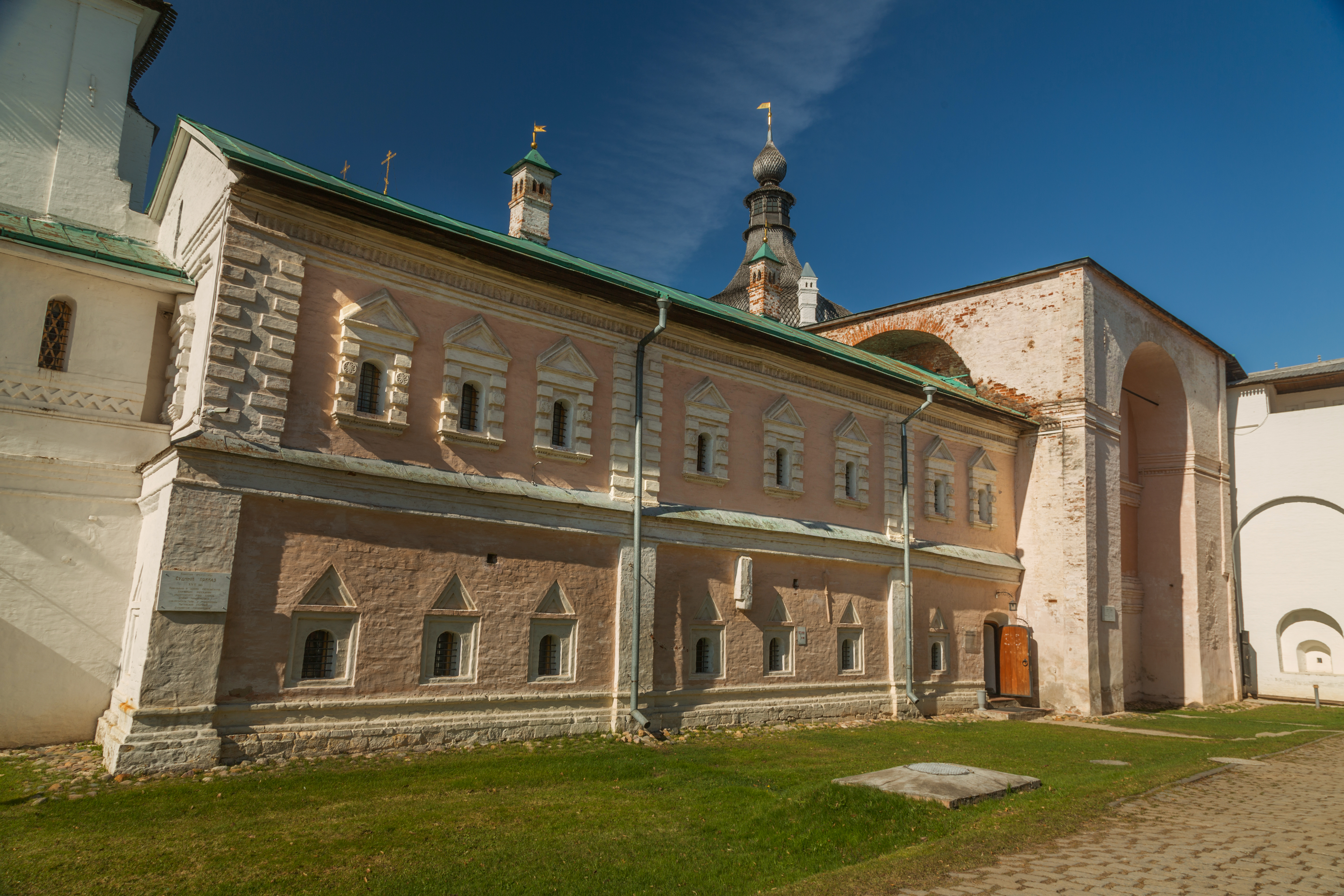
Judicial Office, Rostov Kremlin, Russia. 2018

This two-storey building was erected in the 1650s - 1660s. The rusticated window surrounds and pilaster strips of the first floor can not be found in the Rostov architecture of that period.

=== Church of the Resurrection ===
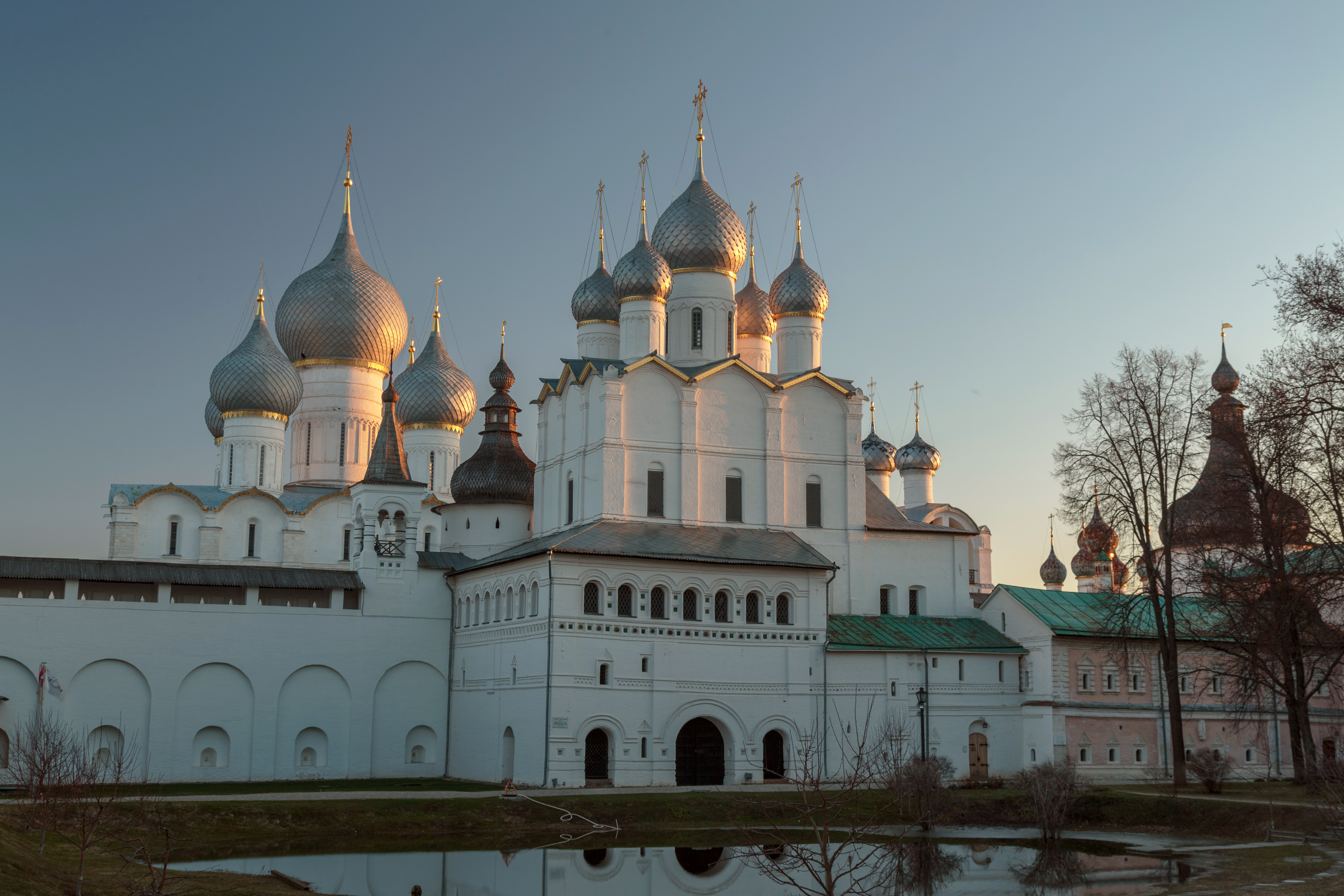
Church of the Resurrection, Rostov Kremlin, Russia. 2018

The gateway Church of the Resurrection with a fortified tower flanking was built next to the Judicial Office. This original composition was used here for the first time in Russian architecture. With its two towers, the gateway Church provided a magnificent main entrance to the Metropolitan's Court, a kind of Holy Gate.

The pillarless cube of the Church, similar to the decoration of the Assumption Cathedral, was decorated on the outside with pilaster strips and horizontal bands, and the pediments of the multi-pitched roof repeat the ogee-shaped kokoshniks that remind one of the cathedral's zakomaras. Other features borrowed from the Assumption Cathedral are the pointed kokoshniks by the guttering and the decor of the five dome drums. The Church of the Resurrection is remarkable for the contrast between the strict upper part, void of the decorative brickwork so characteristic of 17th-century architecture, and the lower part adorned with all sorts of figured brick, multichrome tiles and a large attractive icon niche. That is probably because Metropolitan Jonas saw the ascetic simplicity of the upper part of the church as reflecting the image of the heavenly, celestial world, while the lower part was an image of the earthy world.

The decor of the interior of the Church of the Resurrection is even more original. The rectangular ground plan of the main body, covered by a transverse vault, is adjoined on the east by a sanctuary with a triple apse, and on the south, west and north by galleries. The walls are densely covered with splendid frescoes painted in the 1670s. Unlike other Russian churches of the same period, there were hardly any icons here, only two on either side of the Royal Doors. Instead of the usual wooden iconostasis the Church of the Resurrection has Russia's first high stone iconostasis executed in the fresco technique. As a result, the overall artistic treatment of the interior is exceptionally integrated for its time. The fresco-painted iconostasis in the Church of the Resurrection shows that, unlike most of his contemporaries, Metropolitan Jonas attached a special sacral importance to church wall painting.

The frescoes consist of a chronicle and detailed Gospel account of Christ's earthly life. This unfolds on the walls from the top to the bottom, finishing at the northern edge of the solium with the composition of "The Resurrection of Christ", a direct reference to the church dedication. The interior is well lit by numerous windows and the wall painting in golden ochre, bright blues, greens and pinks makes an unusually festive impression.

For the first time a ciborium or canopy was set up on four gilded posts over the Royal Doors of the iconostasis and the High Place in the sanctuary behind the altar, and the lower section of the iconostasis was decorated with an arcade on gilded semi-columns. Another unusual feature is that the sanctuary together with the adjacent solium and choir places was raised four steps above the level of the floor in the main body of the church. These features were probably designed to lend a special significance to the liturgical rites taking place in the church and led by the Metropolitan Jonas, in other words, the divine service of the arch prelate. The painting in both the sanctuary and the main body of the church was largely designed to serve the same purpose.

The painting in the galleries of the Church of the Resurrection is devoted to subjects from the Old Testament and Revelations, with special emphasis on John the Divine's vision of the heavenly city, the celestial Jerusalem.

=== Church of the Mandilion (Church of our Saviour-by-the Porch) ===
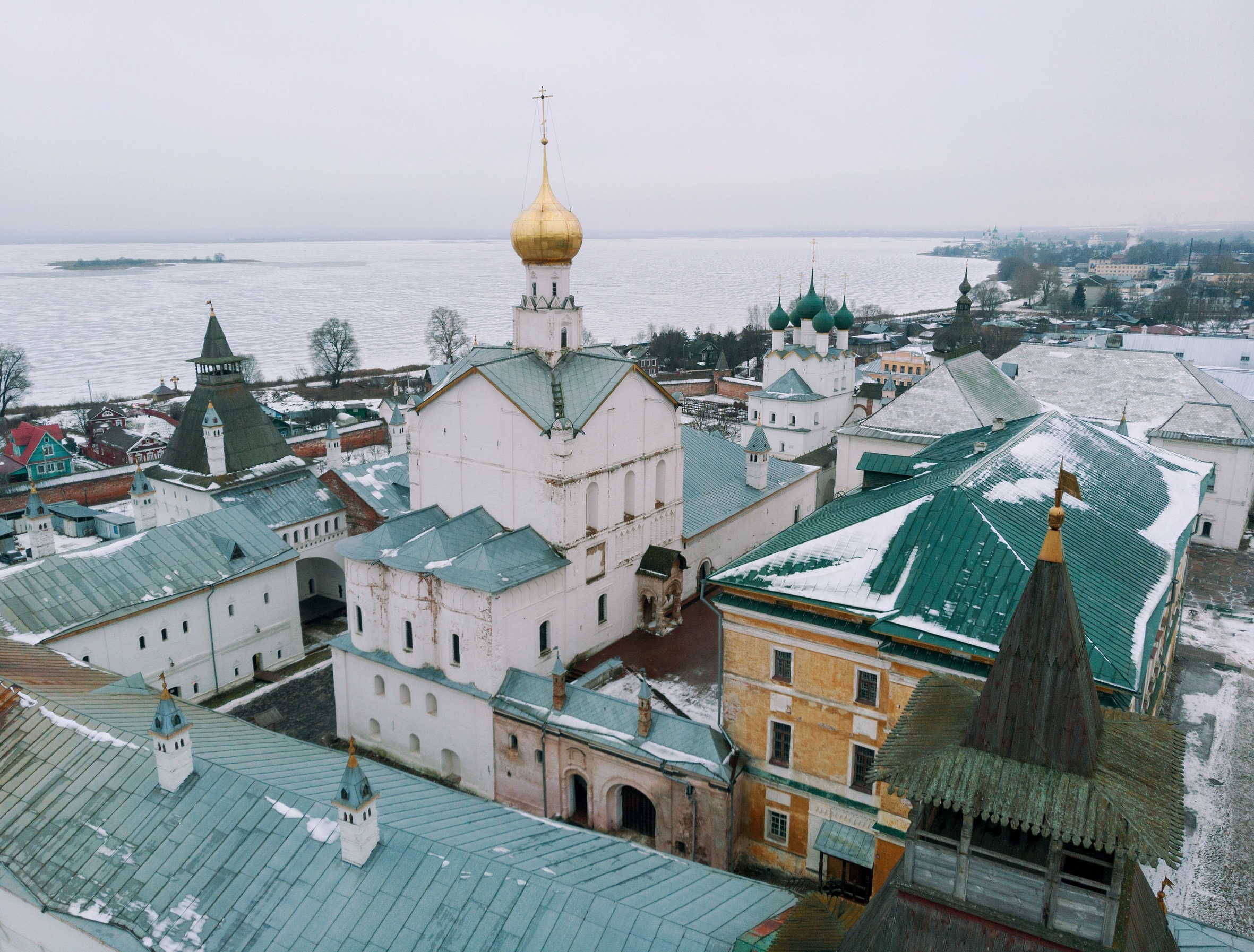
Church of the Mandilion, Rostov Kremlin, Russia. 2020

This complex was built around 1675 behind the Metropolitan Chambers. It served as the private church of the Metropolitan Jonas and was regarded as the main church in the Metropolitan court in those days. The lower storey contained a bakery and other domestic facilities, and the upper one the Church of our Saviour separated by a vestibule from a large refectory with serving chambers adjoining the north facade which were demolished in 1778. The Church is square in plan and has a cross vault. Its slender outline topped by a gold dome on a rather elaborate drum dominates the surrounding buildings. The double-pitched roof, which reflects the church's cross vaulting, was clearly inspired by 16th-century architecture. The most striking details of the decor, namely, the band of blind arcading, the apsidal frieze of five-pointed niches and the kokoshniks by the guttering, were borrowed from the nearby Assumption Cathedral. Almost all the decor including the rich window surrounds, is concentrated in the lower part of the church. The upper section is an austere as that of the gateway Church of the Resurrection.

Shortly after it was built, the Church of our Saviour was painted with frescoes and acquired a stone iconostasis like one in the Church of the Resurrection. Other features of the Church of the Resurrection interior decor are repeated here as well, but Church of our Saviour has some new details which developed the general concept of the interior. The solium has eight steps instead of the usual four and there are no canopies over the High Place in the sanctuary or the Royal Doors. Instead there is an arcade on gilded posts over the solium parapets, somewhat similar to the Byzantine sanctuary barrier. Additional arches of no constructional importance stretch from the arcade to the sanctuary wall. Royal Doors here are shaped like a receding stone portal faced with bronze gilt.

The main forms of the interior and wall painting are connected in meaning and rich in symbolism. Thus, the eight steps of the solium indicate the divine symbolism of the sanctuary to which they lead, since the number eight is a symbol of paradise. This number also indicated that the church belonged to Jonas himself. The fresco of Christ flanked by the Virgin Mary and Apostles on the wall over the solium arcade recalls the Gospel prophesy that on the Day of Judgement, Christ and the Apostles will judge "the 12 tribes of Israel". The images of the 12 sons of Jacob, the ancestors of these 12 tribes are also depicted on the solium parapet just under the arcade. The fresco of the Last Judgement unfolds opposite, on the west wall. Thus the images of the judges and the judged, in keeping with the wishes of Metropolitan Jonas relate to one another.

=== Church of St. John the Divine ===
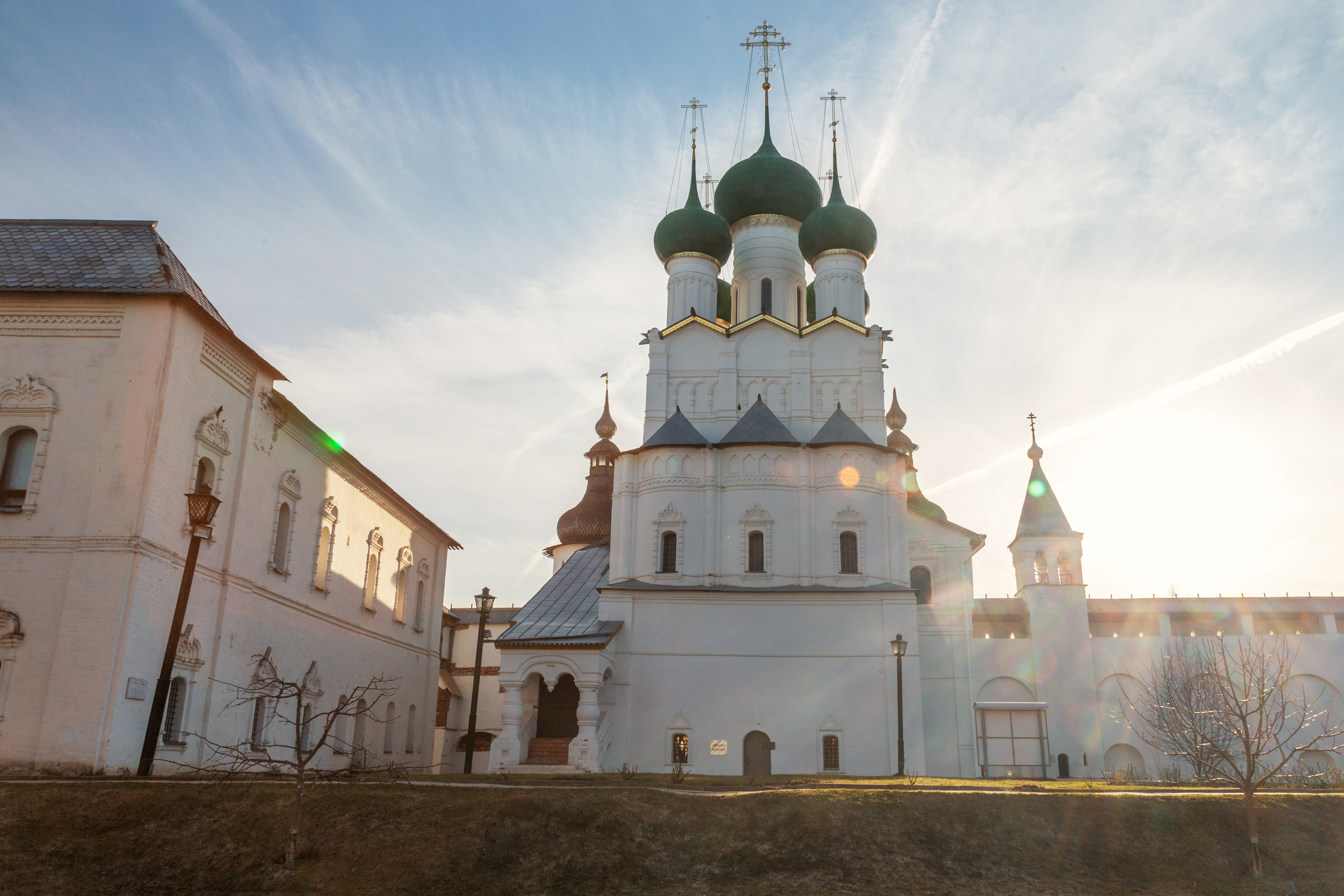
Church of St. John the Divine, Rostov Kremlin, Russia. 2018

Elevated main body, superbly arranged five domes, and beautifully elongated dome drums and crosses the building seems to be soaring up to heaven. As with the earlier Rostov kremlin churches, the decor on the upper part of the facades consists exclusively of elements borrowed from the Assumption Cathedral. The cube with its multi-pitched roof is divided up evenly by pilaster stripes united at the top by ogee-shaped kokoshniks, with a charming ruff of pointed wooden slats above them. There are bands of blind arcading between the pilaster strips and small kokoshniks on the corners by the guttering. The drums are decorated with austere blind arcading and ornamental bands with cornices above them. All decorative elements characteristic of the 17th century (rich window surrounds and other types of patterned brickwork) are concentrated in the lower part of the building, which also repeats the principle of decor on the facades of the earliest Rostov Kremlin churches. At the same time, the contrast between the upper and lower parts of the building is not so strong here, because the bling arcading on the cube and the picturesque icon niche on the west facadebring the two parts closer together in terms of decor, thanks to which it looks more elegant.

The square ground plan and high interior of the building, which has a cross-vaulted roof, repeat the interior of the Church of Our Saviour, while the stone iconostasis with an arcade at the base and the canopies over the Royal Doors and high place are similar to the corresponding elements in the Church of the Resurrection. The solium here is a perfectly ordinary one, however, raised by one step only, which may be explained by the proximity of the church to the Royal Apartments. When the Russian sovereigns were in residence the church may have been used as a royal one, prompting Metropolitan Jonas to refrain from having high solium, one of the most unusual features of the church interiors in his residence.

The Church of St. John the Divine was painted in 1683. The wall paintings in the main body and the sanctuary have survived with only a few small losses. This painting unites three different cycles: the two upper tiers depict subjects from the Gospel story, followed by three tiers with the life of the Apostle John the Divine and right at the bottom, closest of all to the spectator, another tier depicting the life of the Venerable Abraham of Rostov. This combination was clearly programmatic, as John the Divine was one of the central figures in the Life of the Venerable Abraham. It was he who gave Abraham the rod with which he cast down the idol of Veles. The scenes of "The Apostle John the Divine Appearing to the Venerable Abraham of Rostov" and "St. Abraham casting down the idol of Veles" are on the west wall, right next to the entrance, meaning that anyone who came in would realise straightaway that the great Christian saint to whom the church was dedicated had a direct connection with Rostov.

The fresco painters did not simply correlate the three cycles, but moulded them visually into an invisible semantic and artistic whole, giving similar iconographic features to scenes they wished to compare. This similarity is particularly obvious in the scenes of Abraham casting down the idol of Veles and the destruction of the pagan temple by St. John the Divine, and also the scenes of Abraham being taken to be tried by the prince and the "Entry into Jerusalem" in the festal tier of the church's stone iconostasis. So this original method appears to have been used to express the idea of the similarity between the feats of the Venerable Abraham and those of St. John the divine, and to compare both of them to Christ. There can be no doubt that it was Metropolitan Jonas who encouraged the artists to make use of this device.
