= A.L. Kekin Gymnasium =

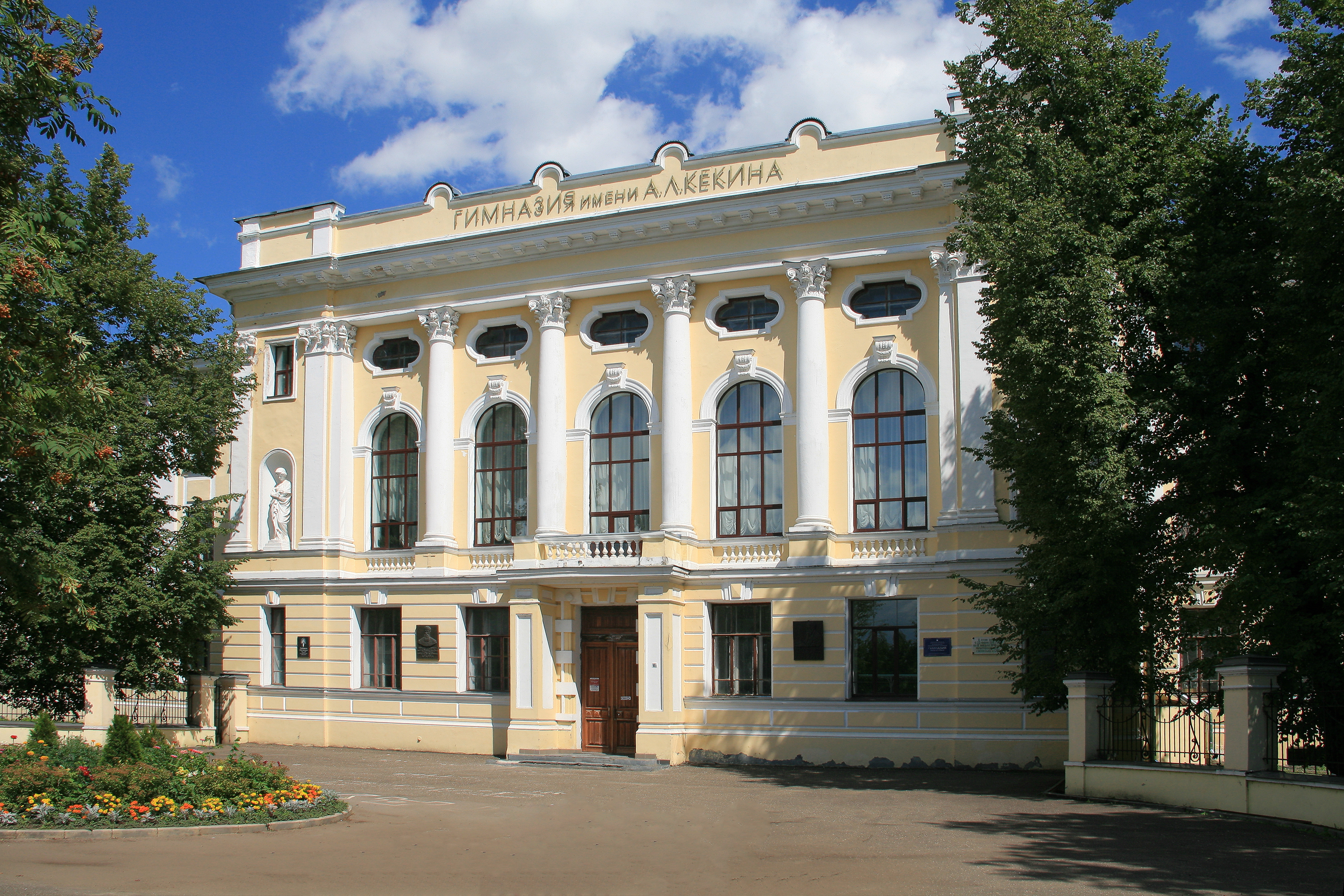

Location
- 6, Moravskogo St. Rostov Veliky; Russia; 57°11′23″N 39°24′52″E

Information
- Type: Gymnasium
- Motto: "School is not for politics!"
- Established: 1907; 119 years ago
- Founder: Alexey Leontievich Kekin
- Director: Danil Brazhnikov
- Staff: > 100
- Gender: Mixed
- Age: 7 to 18
- Enrolment: > 1000
- Language: Russian, English, French, German
- Website: gim-kekina.edu.yar.ru

The A. L. Kekin Gymnasium is a municipal educational institution in Rostov Veliky, Russia. It is the oldest school still running in the Rostovsky District of Yaroslavl Oblast, and it has the most students.

== History ==
=== Pre-establishment ===
After the death of his only son in 1885, Alexei Leontievich Kekin, a native of the Rostov Uyezd and a merchant from Saint Petersburg, decided to give the entirety of his property to the town of Rostov, as stated in his will. Kekin's intention was for the money to be used for the establishment of a boys' gymnasium in Rostov, and later the creation of a university. After Kekin died in 1897, A. A. Titov, a renowned Russian archaeographer, informed the Duma of Rostov about Kekin's will. After completing the preparatory work, the city was confirmed as the primary beneficiary in 1898 when the St. Petersburg District Court ruled to execute the terms within the will. In 1902, a relative, I. P. Kekin, challenged the will in court, and this pushed the opening back from 1905 to 1907.

At the beginning of 1905, the Duma began to discuss the type of new educational institution to be established. Ultimately it was decided to establish an "eight-year classical gymnasium with a curriculum including modern languages, mathematics, and natural sciences".

=== 1906–1917 ===
In 1906, the city decided to open a preparatory class first, followed by the first four grades in the autumn of 1907. The city bought Kononova's house for this, and by spring 1908 it had also rented Malgina's house on Zarovskaya Street.

In October 1907, the city council petitioned the Ministry of Education to name the gymnasium after A. L. Kekin, which was subsequently approved. The gymnasium was built with Kekin's money, and in its early years it ran entirely on funds from his estate.

On September 2, 1907, Sergei Pavlovich Moravsky, a history teacher at the Medvednikov Gymnasium, was elected director of the gymnasium. Choosing a director was not easy. A. A. Titov checked each candidate and would not recommend anyone who had bad reviews from former students. Moravsky agreed to take the job on one main condition: that he could pick the teachers himself. The gymnasium was also quite open for its time. It did not separate students by religion; by 1911, the quota on the number of Jewish students had been lifted, and the physical education teacher Devishchev was a Muslim. The school also chose not to build a house church. Children of peasants and nobles studied side by side, and the teachers held a range of political views. Among them were Social Revolutionaries and Social Democrats.

The first class to graduate went on a trip to Switzerland and Germany with their teachers.

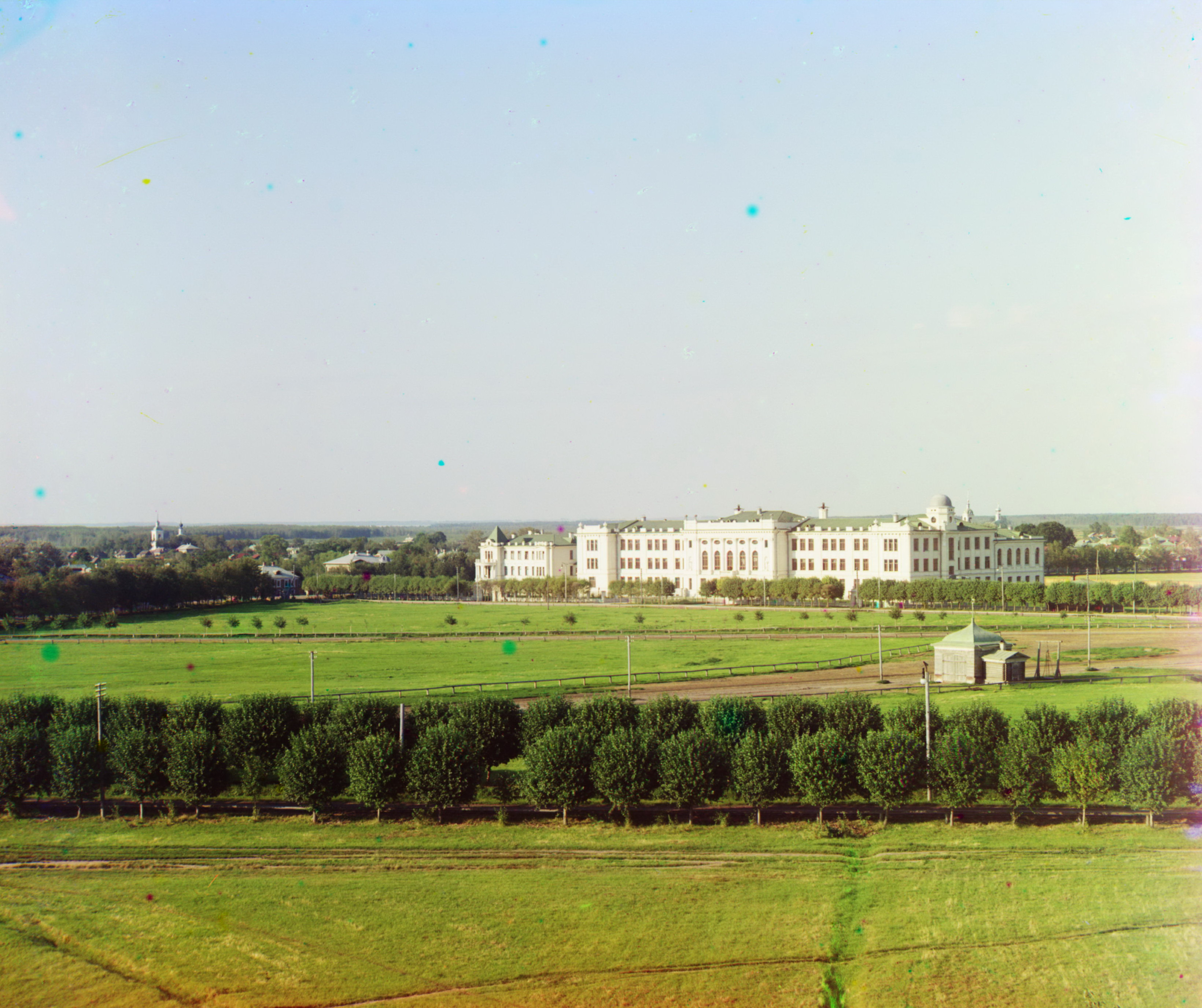
View of the gymnasium from the bell tower of the All Saints Church. Sergey Prokudin-Gorsky (1911)

Local students paid 30 rubles in fees, and half of all students studied for free. The school also offered five scholarships, including the Andrei Titov Scholarship (established by the "Mutual Fire Insurance Society" for city residents), in memory of the 300th anniversary of the House of Romanov (established by the Rolma partnership for the children of employees or workers of the partnership), and in memory of the 50th anniversary of the liberation of peasants from serfdom (Rostov Duma).

Moravsky cared a lot about visual aids and physical education, and he also gave weight to drawing and singing.

In 1912, the school opened an astronomical observatory with a five-inch Reinfelder and Hertel telescope. An astronomy club started around the same time and put out its own journal.

The school was also open on Sundays. Teachers spent several hours with students on those days, so there was no need to hire extra supervisors. With the outbreak of World War I, a hospital for wounded soldiers was set up on the third floor of the gymnasium. Later, a girls' gymnasium also moved into the building.

In 1917, S. P. Moravsky and A. A. Titov planned to go to St. Petersburg to file the papers for a university, but the February Revolution put a stop to the trip. After the October Revolution, the boys' and girls' gymnasiums were turned into four schools: two first-level and two second-level.

=== Soviet period ===
In 1920, Anatoly Lunacharsky, the People's Commissar of Education, visited the school.

Besides the regular schools, the building was also home to a workers' faculty, an adult evening school, a music school, a kindergarten, and some institutions unrelated to education. By spring 1921, only the schools were left, and the building was renamed the "V. Lenin House of Education." In 1921–1922, the gymnasium building housed the Rostov branch of the Moscow Archaeological Institute, which later tried to become a university of its own but closed because it ran out of money.

Running several schools in one building was hard to manage, so in autumn 1924 they were merged into one. This situation continued until the early 1930s, when advanced schools were reorganized into factory-based seven-year schools. The former gymnasium was one of them and became FZS No. 1. The reform did not work as hoped and standards fell, so schooling was made two years longer in 1933 and one more year longer in 1934. Around this time, the school was renamed "Secondary School No. 1 named after V. I. Lenin".

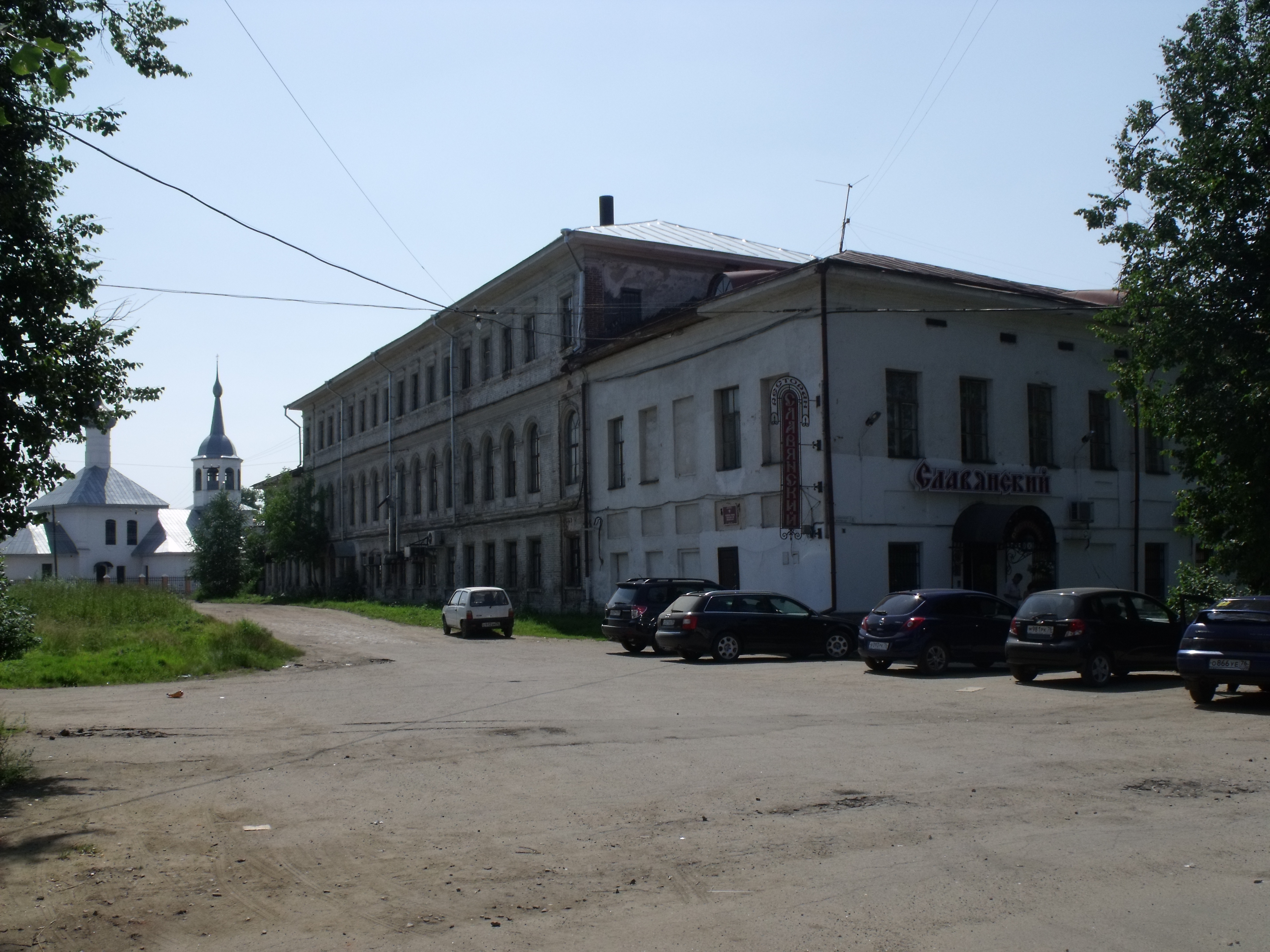
The building of Mariinsky girls' Gymnasium

With the start of the Winter War between Finland and the USSR in 1939, the building became a hospital again, and the students were sent to other schools. When that war ended, the school got its building back, but only for a short time. The Great Patriotic War soon began, and the building was turned into a hospital once more. For a while the students studied in poor, makeshift rooms, and then they moved to the former building of the Mariinsky Girls' Gymnasium. Classes were held in two or three shifts, and lessons focused on skills needed in wartime. Students also had to do farm or factory work. The school returned to its own building in 1947.

In the 1950s, the school ran in two shifts. In 1955 and 1956, seven 10th-grade classes graduated. Around the same time, many younger teachers joined the staff. For its 50th anniversary, the school opened its own museum.

In the early 1960s, the school switched to an 11-year education system. One day a week was now set aside only for job training. The school set up a metalworking shop and added classrooms for car mechanics and machine engineering. Students also did practical training at sewing and linen factories, and a class for future teachers was held at the Pioneer House. By 1966, national education policy had changed again, and the school went back to ten years. In those years, Alexei Sergeyevich Orlov started a math school, subject contests were held, and technical hobby clubs became popular.

In the 1970s, the city council named the school after V. I. Lenin. During the same period, the regional leadership, headed by First Secretary of the Yaroslavl Regional Committee of the Communist Party of the Soviet Union F. I. Loshchenkov, planned to move the museum from the Rostov Kremlin to the school building, and a new school building was designed on Gogol Street for this. Public protest stopped the plan.

In the early 1980s, the school updated its teaching equipment and got televisions, film projectors, tape recorders, film viewers, and other equipment. Computer science was added as a new subject, though the school had no computer lab yet. In the 1990s, the school went back to 11 years, this time by adding a year to primary school. In 1991, the school became a gymnasium again, and two years later, the first class of gymnasium students graduated.

=== Post-Soviet period ===
In 1999, the school got back the name of Alexei Leontievich Kekin. Teacher groups were turned into departments, specialist classes were set up, and scholarships were created (named after A. L. Kekin, S. P. Moravsky, and P. G. Trubnikov). In 2006, the gymnasium won a contest for schools running new teaching programs. The gymnasium has exchange links with schools in Stevens Point (USA), Holmfirth (England), Nîmes (France), Jämsä (Finland), and Neuburg an der Donau (Germany), It also runs a medicine and biology school together with the Yaroslavl Medical Academy.

== Endowment ==
In December 2024, after a year of fundraising led by principal Danil Brazhnikov and backed by the Rybakov Foundation, the school officially registered the "A. L. Kekin Gymnasium Endowment" (Russian: Целевой капитал „Гимназия имени А. Л. Кекина“) was officially registered. To set up the fund, the school needed at least 3 million rubles. By the time it opened in December 2024, it had 5.2 million. Donations kept coming in, and by August 2025 the fund had reached 7.6 million rubles. Donors include former students, parents and partners of the school. It is one of the 20 largest school endowments in Russia.

Date	Fund size
January 2024 (start of fundraising)	0 ₽
December 2024 (official opening)	5.2 mln ₽
August 2025	7.6 mln ₽

The endowment gives the school a steady source of money outside its state budget, to pay for long-term growth. A specialist foundation handles the legal side, and a management company invests the money. Under Russian law, the main sum cannot be spent. Only the money it earns from investments goes to school projects.

The fund's board, made up of school leaders and active donors, decides what the money is spent on.

In December 2023, a documentary about the school's recent history was released with support from the Rybakov Foundation.

In 2024, the school held a family festival called "Kekin Courtyards" to bring its supporters together.

Besides the endowment, the school also takes direct donations for current projects. Every donor's name is listed on the school's website. Anyone who gives 5,000 rubles or more gets a souvenir as a thank-you.
