= Alexey Sergienko =

Russian artist

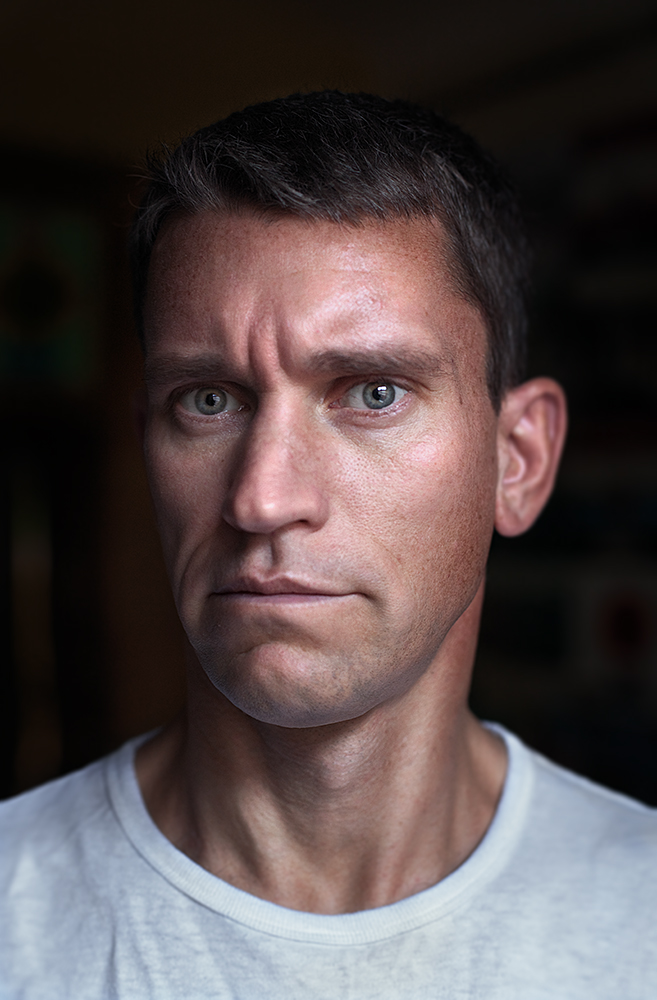
- 19-12-2013
- Born: November 29, 1968; Leningrad
- Known for: Painting

Alexey Vladimirovich Sergienko (born November 29, 1968, Leningrad, USSR) is a Russian artist and entrepreneur.

== Biography ==
Born on November 29, 1968, in St. Petersburg, Alexey Sergienko currently lives and works in his gallery next to the Kazan Cathedral. For a long time, the main direction of his work was the genre of pop art and political art. His work has later switched to actionism, performance, installation and sculpture. One of the most recognizable works is, "Daisies", which was written in 2012. "Daisies" have become the artist's signature style and are present in almost every work. In the same year, Sergienko turned his BMW X6 into an art object - he transferred the print of his work "Chamomile" to the entire surface of the car.

Sergienko is known for quite provocative art projects, for example, the collection of paintings “President. A man of the kindest soul”, pictures from which are in the Kremlin, the State Duma, the Ministry of Foreign Affairs, the Federation Council.

In 2014, chocolate appeared on the market, on the wrapper of which there were images of paintings from the collection. The series continues with the Rodina collection, the main motive of which is the symbols of Russia - Putin, Kremlin stars, birch trees, nesting dolls, and chamomile. The collection was exhibited at the Parisian Louvre, and also served as the basis for the creation in 2014 of a clothing brand, and in 2015 - a collection of furniture. In 2016, an exhibition of Sergienko's paintings "Emotions of the World" was held, created for Putin's birthday. The collection shows the variety of emotions expressed by the head of state, based on photo chronicles published in the media.

His other projects include: "Time Machine" (an art object that transports people to childhood), "Museum of Emotions" (an interactive museum telling about emotional intelligence), in which Dmitry Ozerkov, head of the department of contemporary art of the State Hermitage, commented, “A visit to such a museum inevitably gives an impetus to the development of our emotional intelligence, and therefore to the formation of a more accurate and independent view of the world. Emotional breadth is a necessary property of a person of the future for survival in a world that is almost completely controlled by artificial intelligence."

== Other projects of the artist ==
- "Bus of Happiness" (a regular bus in daisies that makes people happy).
- A performance entitled, "I invite you to my funeral" (the artist held his own funeral).
- A performance called, "Yoga is an Art" at the Hermitage General Staff building.
- Monuments to Alexander II on the territory Academy of the Investigative Committee of the Russian Federation, A. Devier - the first police chief of St. Petersburg by order of the Ministry of Internal Affairs, etc.

In total, the artist has more than 1000 completed projects.

One of Sergienko's first projects is the public organization "Center for the Support of the Arts of St. Petersburg", a project that unites street artists and handicraftsmen. Sergienko traded his porcelain on the street from 1989 to 1992, while working as an artist at a factory and studying at the university. In 2020, the “Center…” project became a long-term tenant of the filter zone station on Penkovaya Street in St. Petersburg, which, after renovations, will become the center of contemporary art, "Art Station".

Sergienko mainly presents his exhibitions in St. Petersburg and Moscow with international exhibitions in America, Италии, Italy, France, Switzerland, etc.

Together with billionaire Igor Rybakov, Sergienko created an art object, "Money Throne X10" - a glass throne filled with $1 million.

In October 2020, graffiti appeared on the facade of a residential complex in Murino, authored by Alexey Sergienko. The artist presented the drawing to all doctors who are fighting the coronavirus. In the spring of 2021, the graffiti was entered into the Russian Book of Records.

== Exhibitions ==
- 2013 - ArtExpoNewYork, Sergienko Gallery, New York, USA;
- 2014 - Carousell du Louvre, Sergienko Gallery, Paris, France;
- 2015-2019 - regular participant of VK Fest, St. Petersburg, Russia;
- 2016 - exhibition "Realism", performance "Yoga is an Art", Hermitage, St. Petersburg;
- 2018 - I giorni di San Pietroburgo nelle Marche Sergienko, Senigallia, Italy;
- 2019 - Art Residence, presentation of the art object "Money Throne X10", co-author Igor Rybakov, Moscow.
- 2020 - Art Russia, Moscow.

== Personal life ==
Sergienko is the father of seven children and has been teaching yoga according to his own method for 28 years.
