= Rostov Veliky =

Town in Yaroslavl Oblast, Russia

Rostov Veliky Ростов Великий
- Town
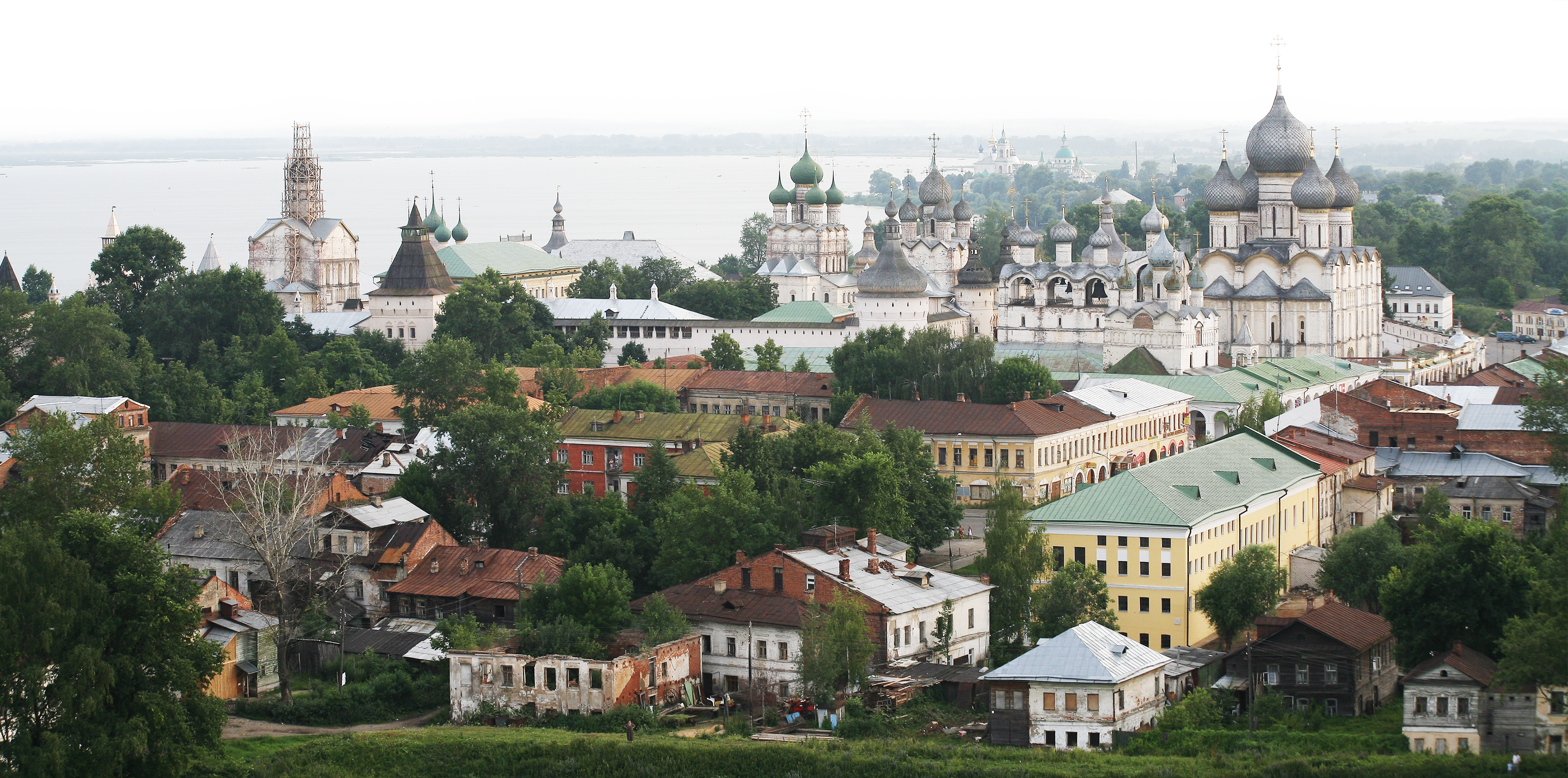
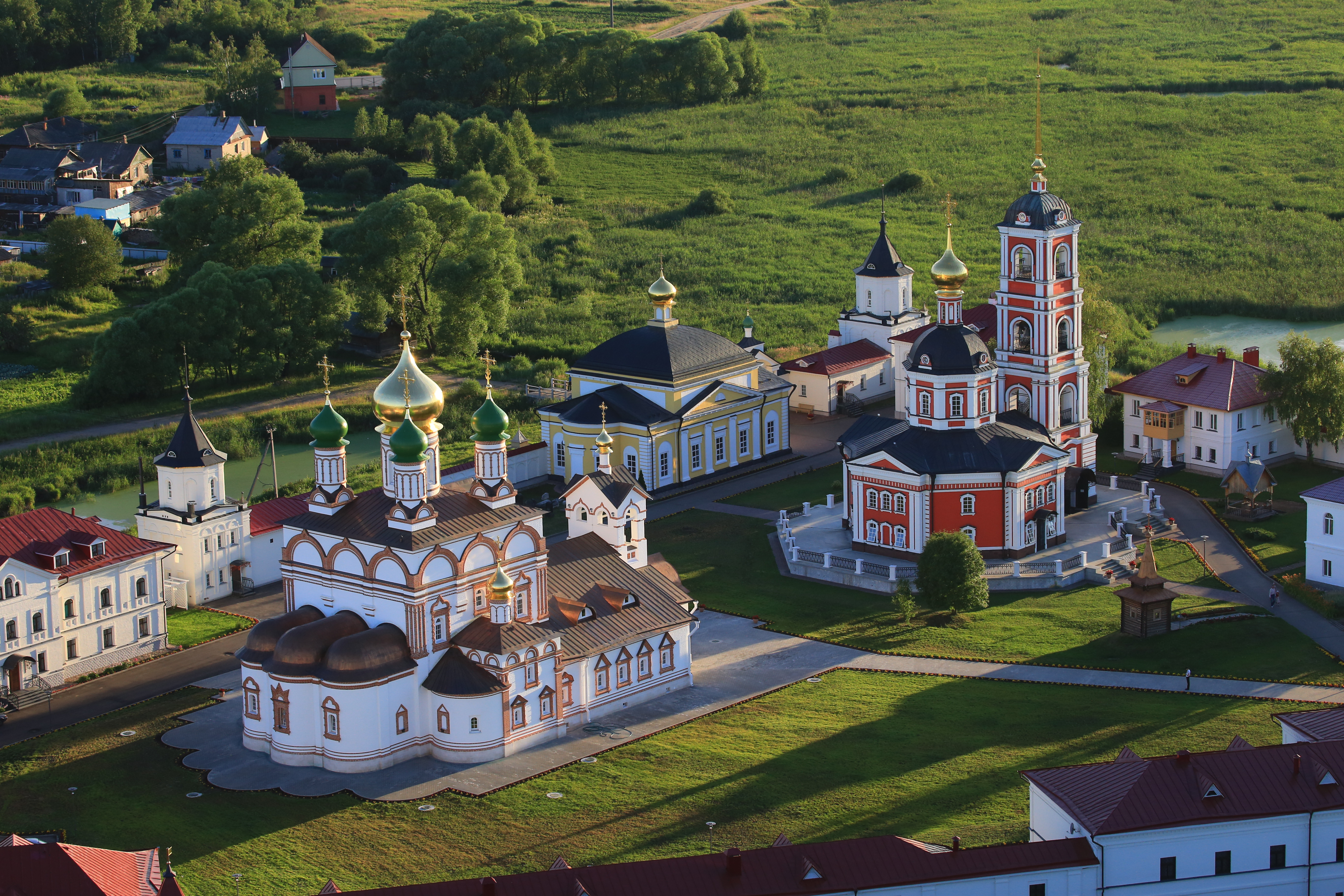
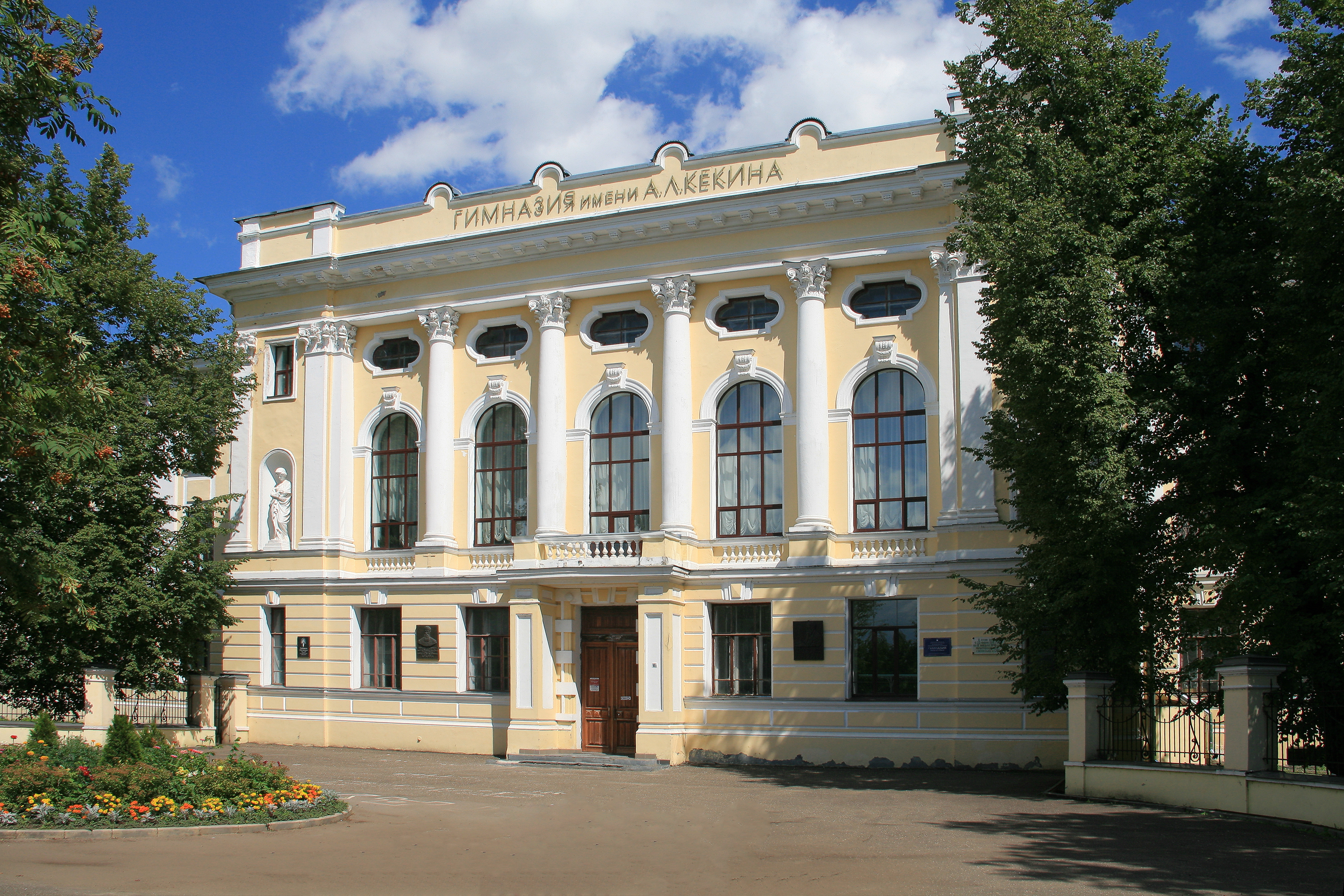
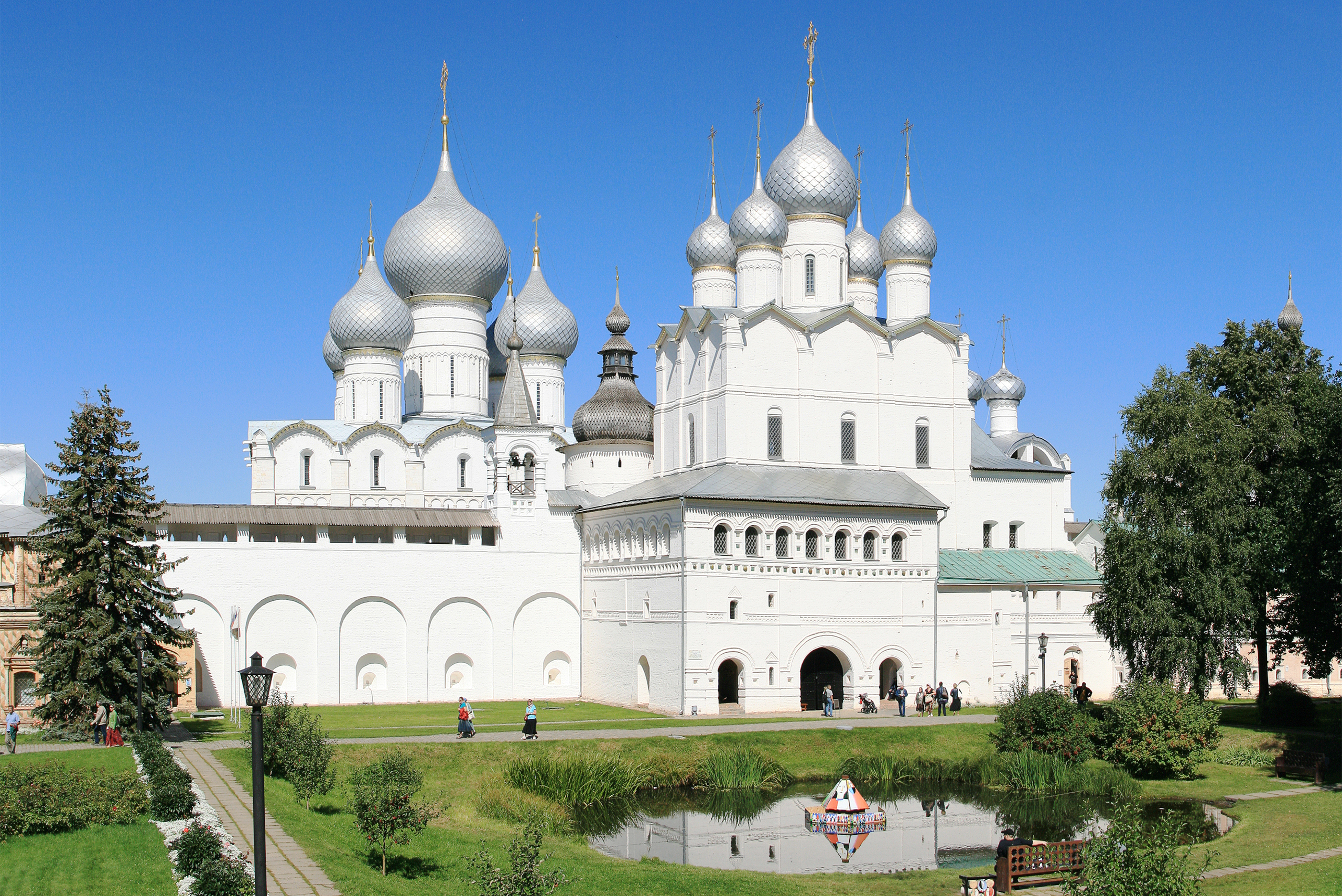
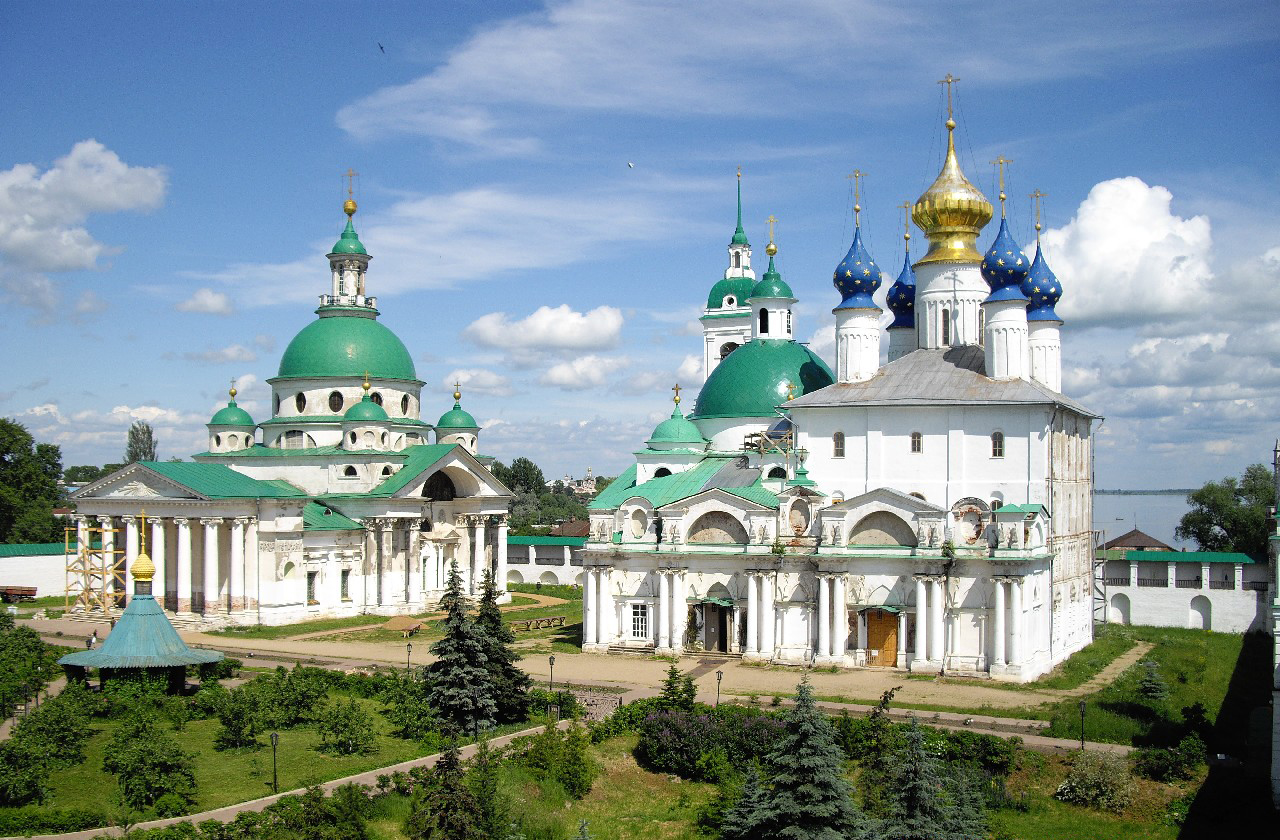
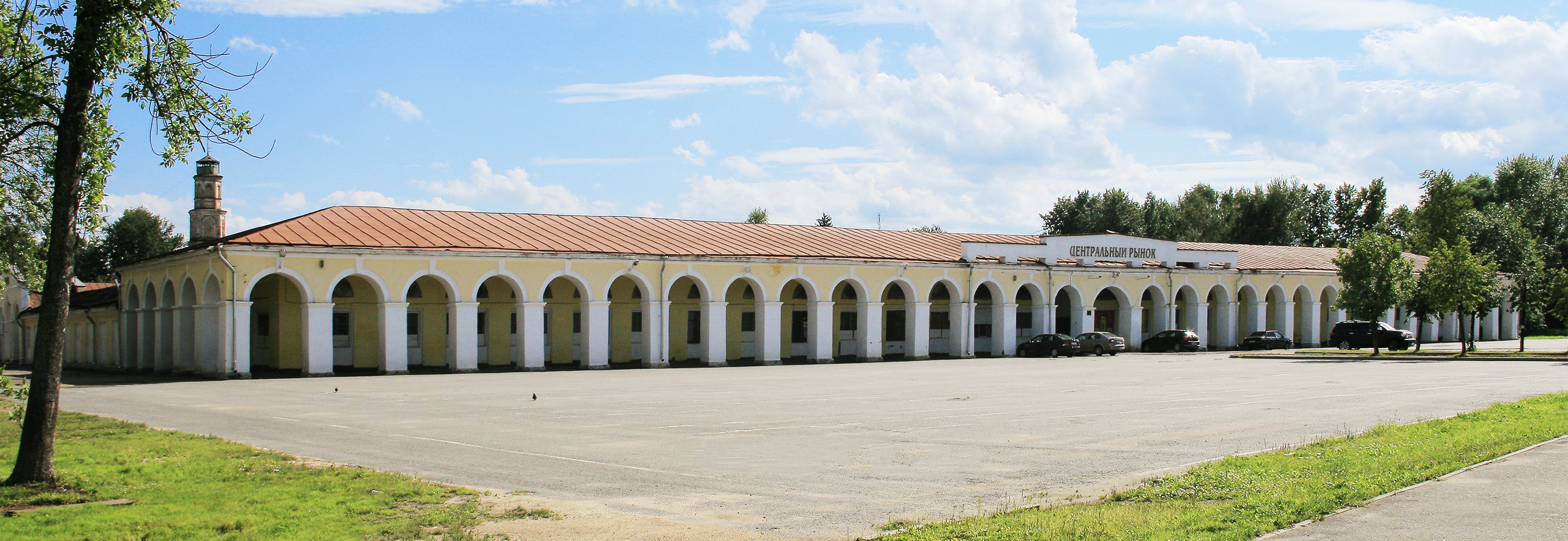
- From top to bottom, left to right: Rostov Kremlin and city panorama, Varnitsky Monastery, A.L. Kekin Gymnasium, Church of the Resurrection of Christ, Spaso-Yakovlevsky Monastery, Customs House

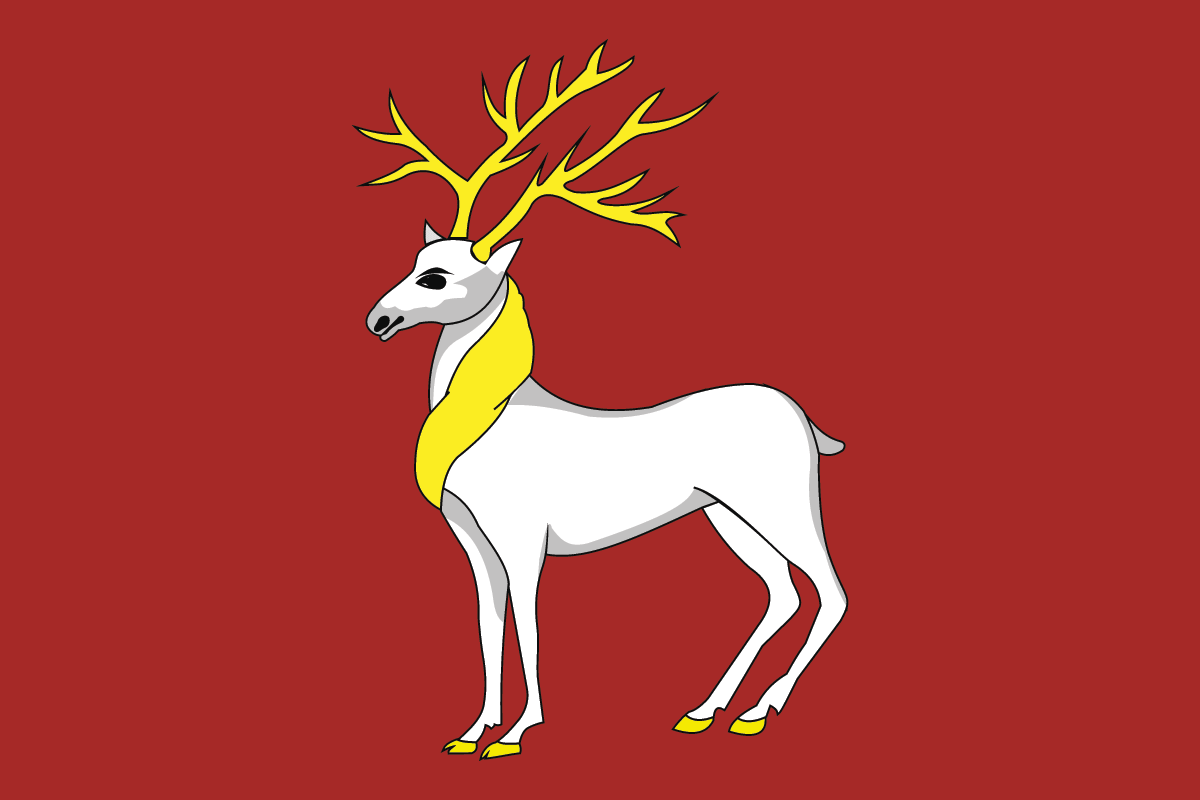
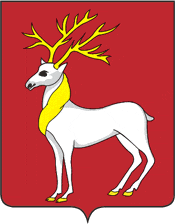
- Flag Coat of arms
- Interactive map of Rostov Veliky
- Location of Rostov Veliky Rostov Veliky (Yaroslavl Oblast)
- Coordinates: 57°11′N 39°25′E
- Country: Russia
- Federal subject: Yaroslavl Oblast
- Founded: 862

Government
  - Mayor: Andrey Los'
- Elevation: 100 m (330 ft)

Population (2010 Census)
  - Total: 31,792
  - Estimate (2021): 30,406 (−4.4%)

Administrative status
  - Subordinated to: town of oblast significance of Rostov
  - Capital of: Rostovsky District, town of oblast significance of Rostov

Municipal status
  - Municipal district: Rostovsky Municipal District
  - Urban settlement: Rostov Urban Settlement
  - Capital of: Rostovsky Municipal District
- Time zone: UTC+3 (MSK)
- Postal code: 152150
- Dialing code: +7 48536
- OKTMO ID: 78637101001

Rostov Veliky (Russian: Ростов Великий, [rɐˈstof vʲɪˈlʲikʲɪj], lit. 'Rostov the Great') is a town and the administrative center of Rostovsky District in Yaroslavl Oblast, Russia. It is one of the oldest towns in the country and a tourist center of the Golden Ring.

It is located on the shores of Lake Nero, 202 kilometers (126 mi) northeast of Moscow. The town's railway station is Rostov Yaroslavsky, and it is situated on the M8 federal highway, which connects Moscow and Arkhangelsk. In 2025, the name of the town was officially changed from Rostov to Rostov Veliky.

== Etymology ==
The name Rostov is associated with the Slavic given name Rost (cf. Rostislav), from which a possessive adjective was formed with the suffix -ov.

The town was historically known as Rostov Veliky ('Rostov the Great') from the 12th to 17th centuries. It was originally given the title as it was the center of a principality; the Hypatian Codex refers to it as Rostov Veliky in 1151 when describing events. However, it lost the title as its importance had declined; its status as a religious center was diminished when the see was transferred to Yaroslavl in 1788. The name of the town was officially changed back to Rostov Veliky on 8 January 2025.

It is known from Norse sources as Rostofa, or Raðstofa.

== History ==
Rostov was preceded by Sarskoye Gorodishche, which some scholars interpret as the capital of the Meryans, a Finnic tribe, while others believe it was an important Viking trade enclave and fortress guarding the Volga trade route. The Meryans inhabited the area from the 7th to 10th centuries, and traces of craft activities from this period have been found on the site.

The town is first mentioned in the Primary Chronicle under the year 862 as one of the towns subject to Rurik. Continuous urban development can be traced from the 980s. The town's earliest fortifications, dating to the 10th–13th centuries, have not survived, although a moat and rampart likely existed along the town's perimeter.

In the late 10th and 11th centuries, Rostov was often assigned to one of the sons of the Kievan grand princes, including Yaroslav Vladimirovich and Boris Vladimirovich. From the late 11th to the mid-12th century, Rostov was the capital of the Rostov-Suzdal principality, and it subsequently became part of the Grand Principality of Vladimir, a major Russian principality. It became the capital of the Principality of Rostov in 1207–1208. However, during the Mongol conquest, Rostov was seized by the Mongols in 1238 after offering no resistance, seemingly leaving the town undamaged.

Rostov eventually declined in political and economic significance between the 13th and 15th centuries, although it remained a major religious and cultural center. It was divided into two domains, one of which was acquired by Grand Prince Ivan I of Moscow no later than 1332. The rest of the principality was finally incorporated into the Grand Principality of Moscow in 1474, during the reign of Ivan III, after he purchased it from the princes of Rostov.

Since the incorporation into the centralized Russian state, the traditions of the old principality were symbolically represented in various expanded titles of the grand princes of Moscow and later the tsars and emperors of Russia: up to 1917, they were all styled as rulers of various historical polities, including Rostov. Thus in Latin versions of those titles, the old principality was referred to as Rostovia.

Rostov remained an ecclesiastic center – from 988, it was the see of the Diocese of Yaroslavl, one of the first Russian bishoprics. In the 14th century, the bishops of Rostov became archbishops, and from the 16th century, metropolitans. In 1608, Rostov was completely destroyed by the Poles during the Polish invasion. Afterwards, Metropolitan Iona (Jonah) Sysoyevich commissioned the town's main landmark: the Rostov Kremlin. This is regarded by some as the finest outside that of Moscow. In 1788, the see was transferred to Yaroslavl and Rostov lost its religious authority.

Rostov is renowned for manufacturing enamels.

In 1907, the A.L. Kekin Gymnasium opened in the town with money left by the merchant Alexei Kekin.

On August 24, 1953, the town was hit by an F3 tornado, causing severe damage. The tornado traveled 6 kilometers with a maximum width of up to 550 meters.

== Administrative and municipal status ==
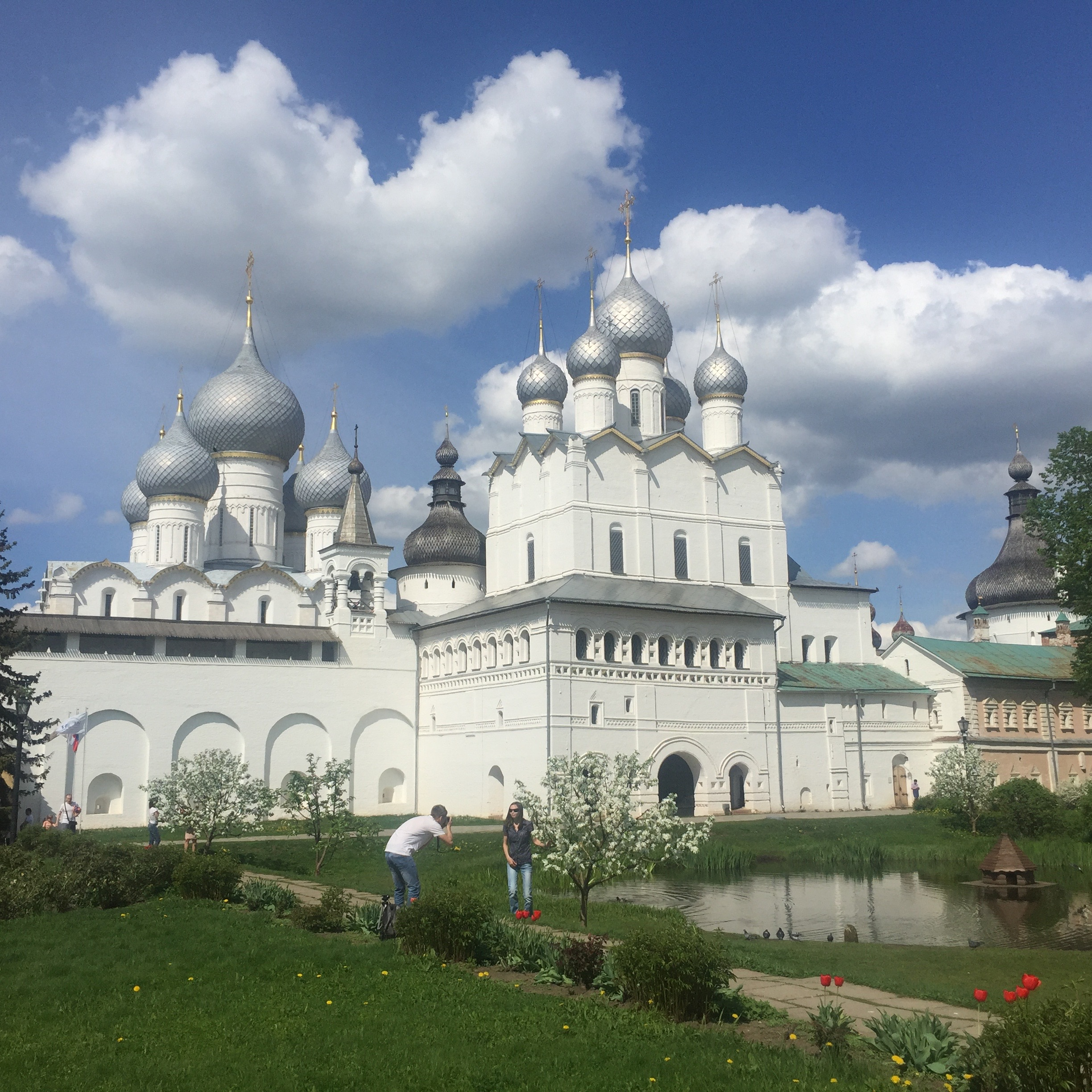
The Rostov Kremlin during spring

Within the framework of administrative divisions, Rostov serves as the administrative center of Rostovsky District, even though it is not a part of it. As an administrative division, it is incorporated separately as the town of oblast significance of Rostov—an administrative unit with the status equal to that of the districts. As a municipal division, the town of oblast significance of Rostov is incorporated within Rostovsky Municipal District as Rostov Urban Settlement.

== Main sights ==
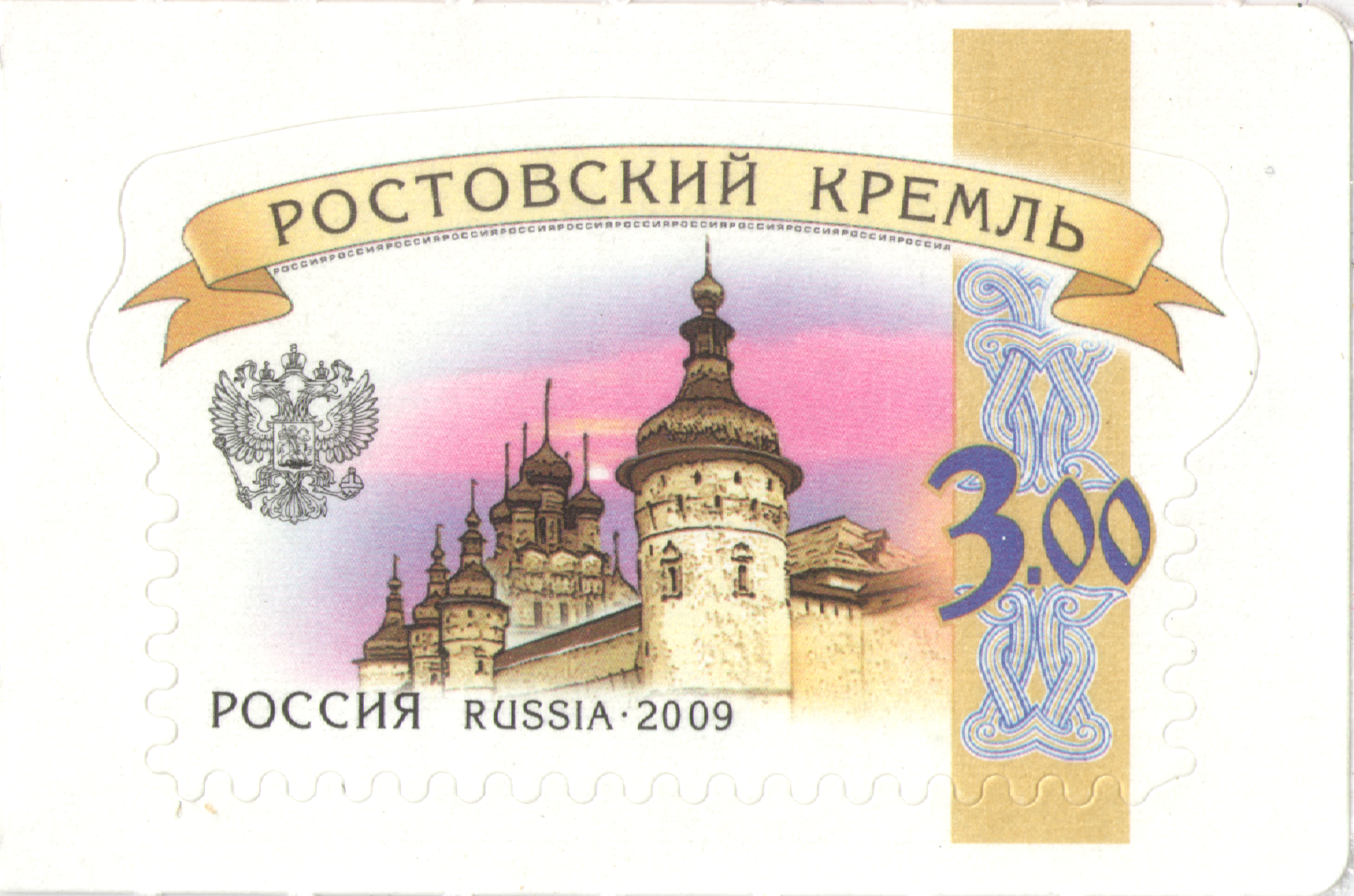
Definitive stamp of Russia showing Rostov Kremlin.

The architecture of the city shows many examples of early Russian Orthodox architecture. The central town square of Rostov is occupied by the Assumption Cathedral. It is unknown when the present building was erected, the mid-16th century being the most likely date. Lower parts of the cathedral walls are dated to the 12th century. The ponderous bell tower was constructed mostly in the 17th century. Its bells are among the largest and most famous in Russia - each has its own name. The largest bell, cast in 1688, weighs 32,000 kilograms (71,000 lb). It is named Sysoy to honor the city's founding father. The church is home to the incorrupt body of Saint Leontius of Rostov.

An area situated between the cathedral square and the lake was chosen by Iona Sysoevich as a place for his fairy-tale residence. All the construction works were carried out between 1667 and 1694. Major buildings include the ornate Savior Church-na-Senyakh (1675), the sombre Church of St. Gregory (1670), and the barbican churches of St. John the Apostle (1683) and of the Resurrection of Christ (1670). The residence, often erroneously called kremlin, also includes eleven ornate tower bells, numerous palaces, several small belfries, and the diminutive baroque Church of Our Lady of Smolensk (1693). All the churches are elaborately painted and decorated.

The cathedral and four tall kremlin churches with their silver "blind" domes were imitated throughout the city. This is particularly evident in the Savior-on-the-Market church and the cathedral church of the Nativity convent, both dating from the 17th century and situated near the kremlin walls. The oldest church within the town center was consecrated to St. Isidore the Blessed in 1565. According to legend, Ivan the Terrible had the architect executed, because his church was so much smaller than its predecessor.

The kremlin is flanked by two monasteries, both facing the Lake Nero. To the right from the kremlin stands the Abraham Monastery, founded in the 11th century and one of the oldest in Russia. Its cathedral, commissioned by Ivan the Terrible in 1553 to commemorate the conquest of Kazan, inspired numerous churches in the region, particularly in Yaroslavl.

Spaso-Yakovlevsky Monastery, situated to the left from the Kremlin on the town's outskirts, has been venerated as the shrine of St. Dmitry of Rostov. Most of the monastery structures were built in the late 18th and early 19th centuries in the fine neoclassical style. There are also two 17th-century churches: the Conception of St. Anna, and the Transfiguration of Our Savior. Unlike most other churches in the town, the monastery belongs to the Russian Orthodox Church and houses a theological seminary.

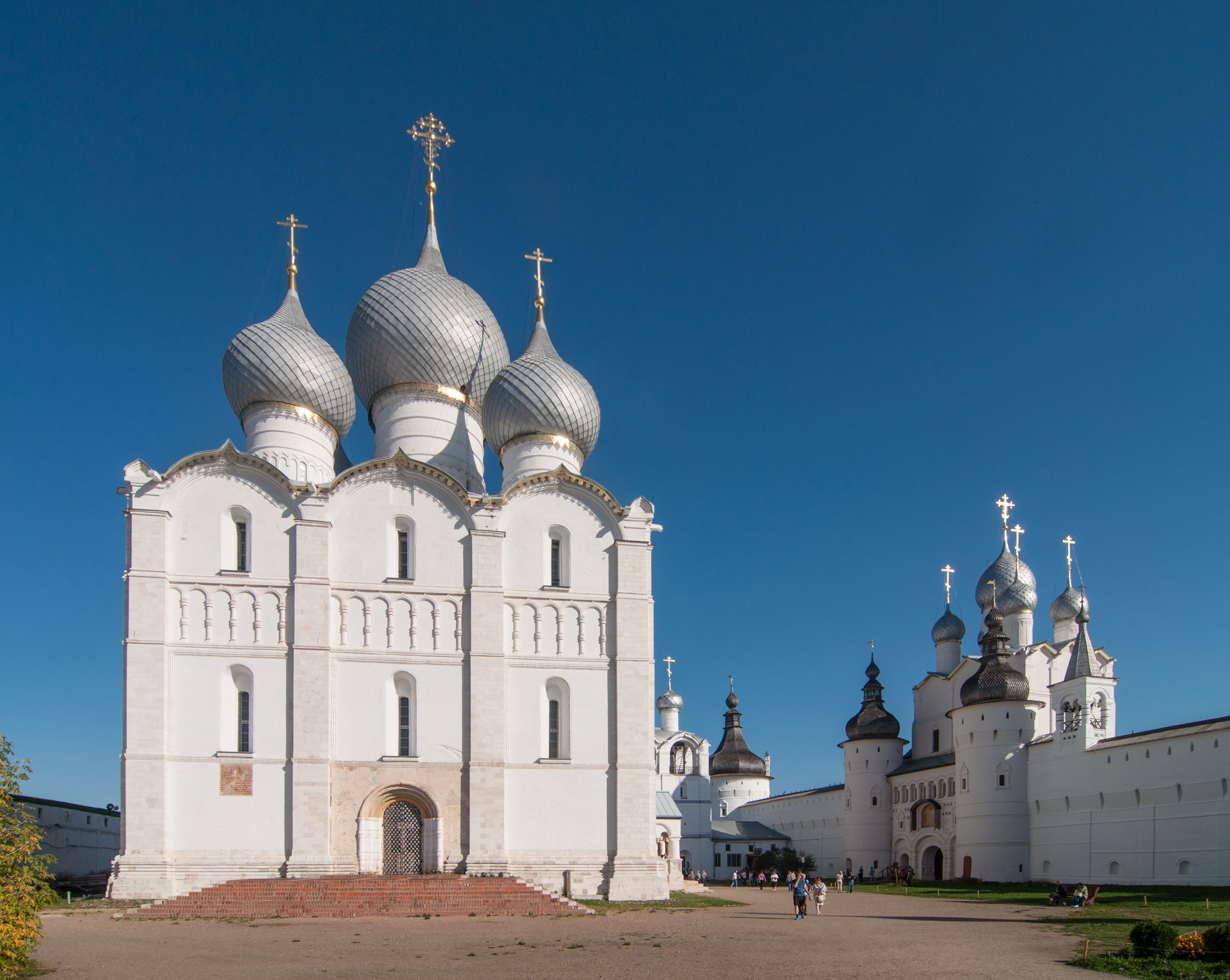
Cathedral of the Dormition of the Theotokos

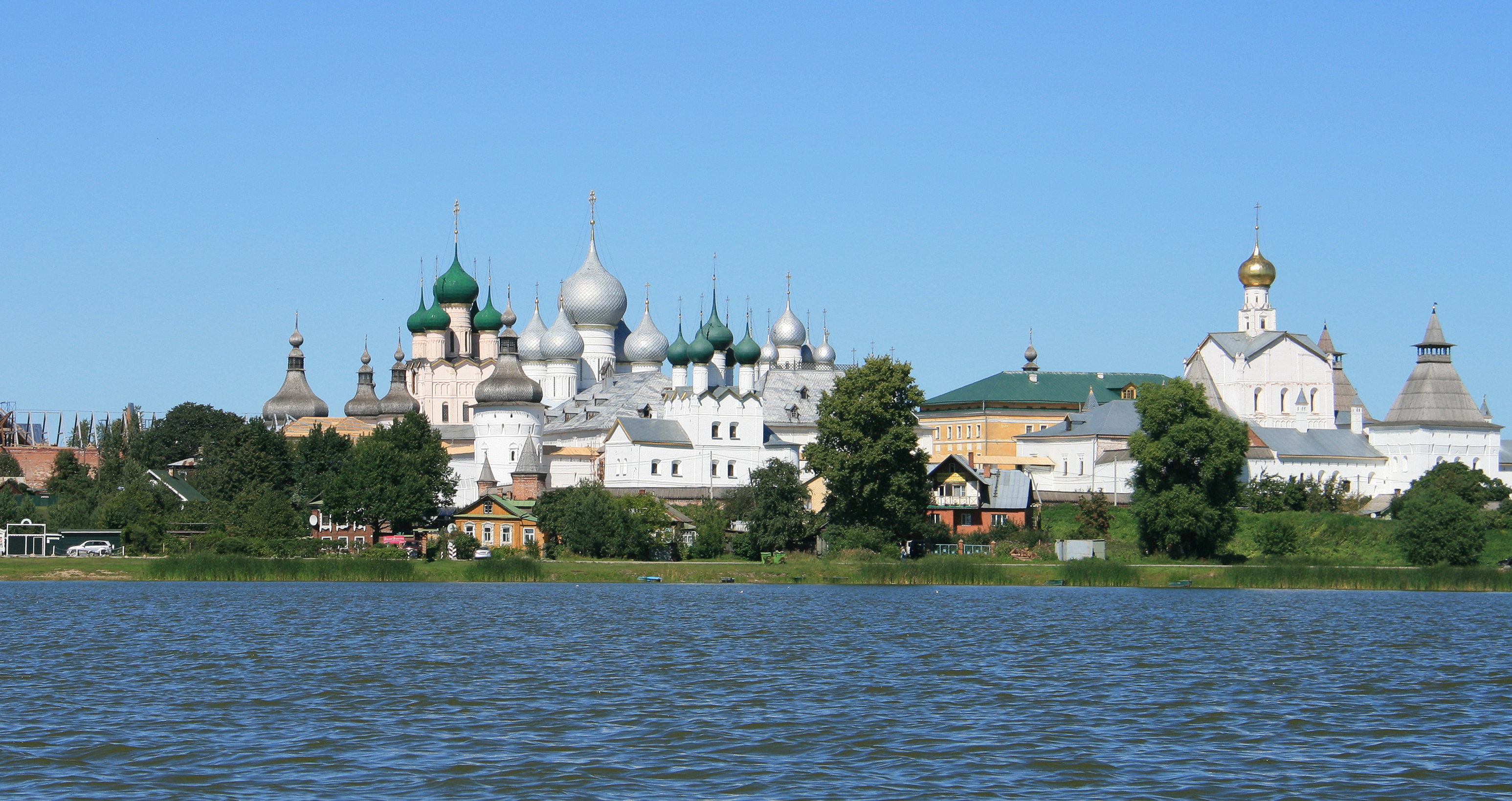
The citadel of Rostov seen from Lake Nero

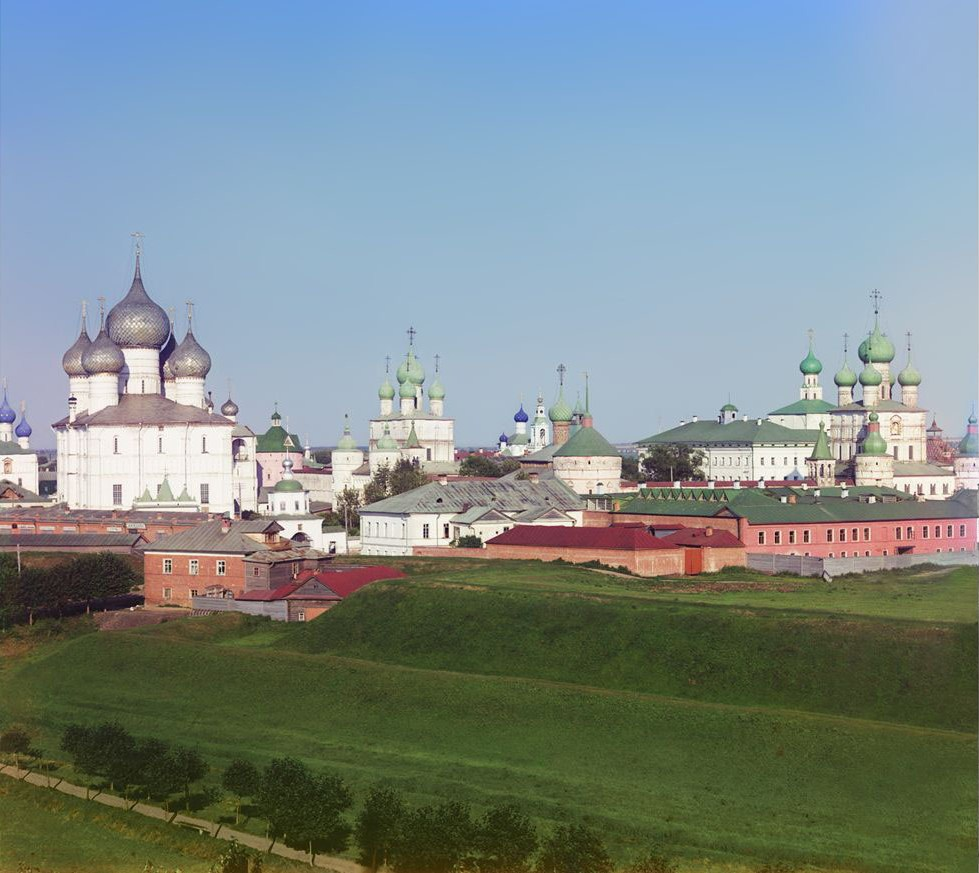
Rostov Kremlin in summer (1911)

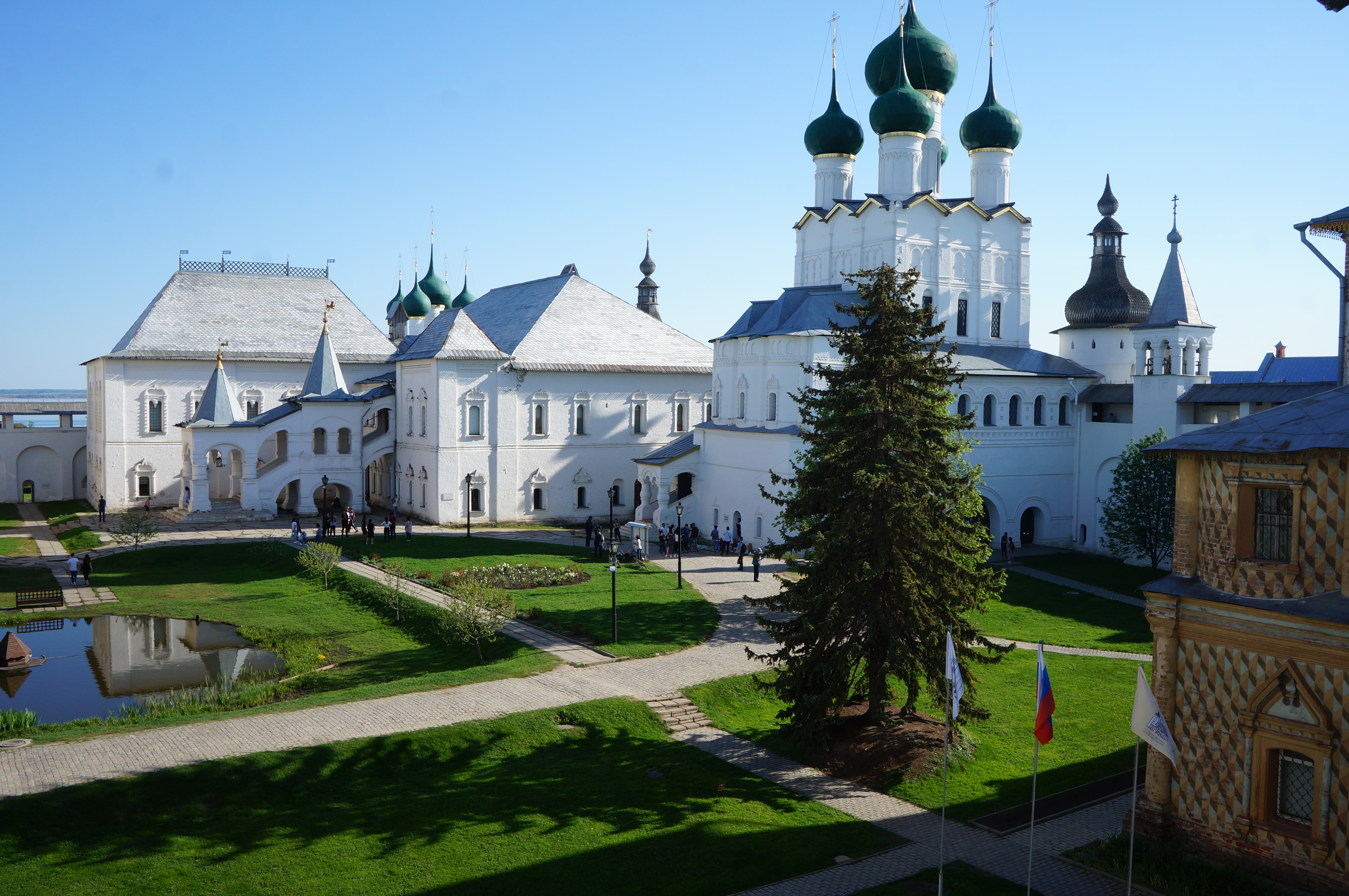
The courtyard in the kremlin

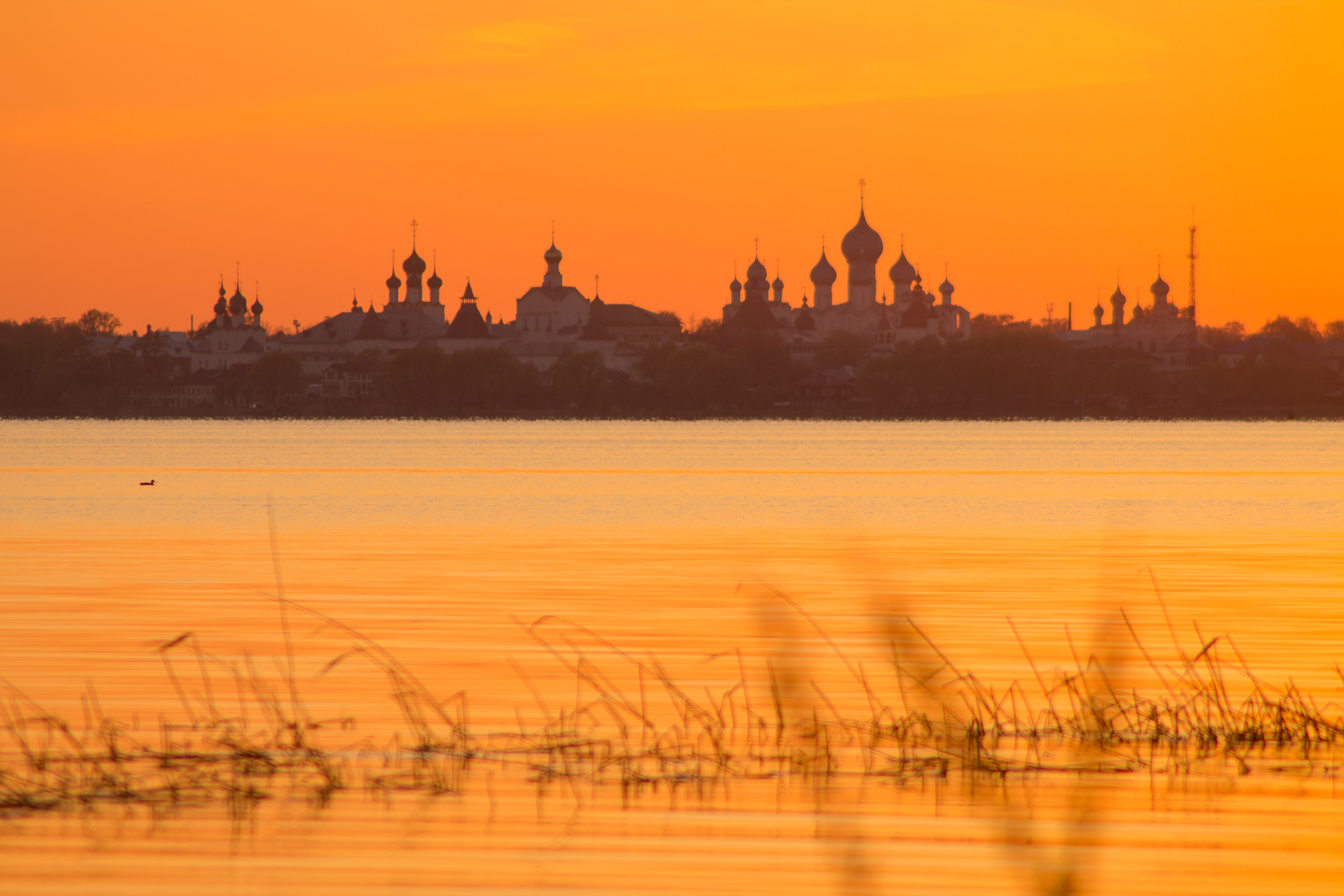
Lake Nero

== Demographics ==
Population: 30,406 (2021 census); 31,792 (2010 census); 34,141 (2002 census); 35,707 (1989 Soviet census).

== Surroundings ==
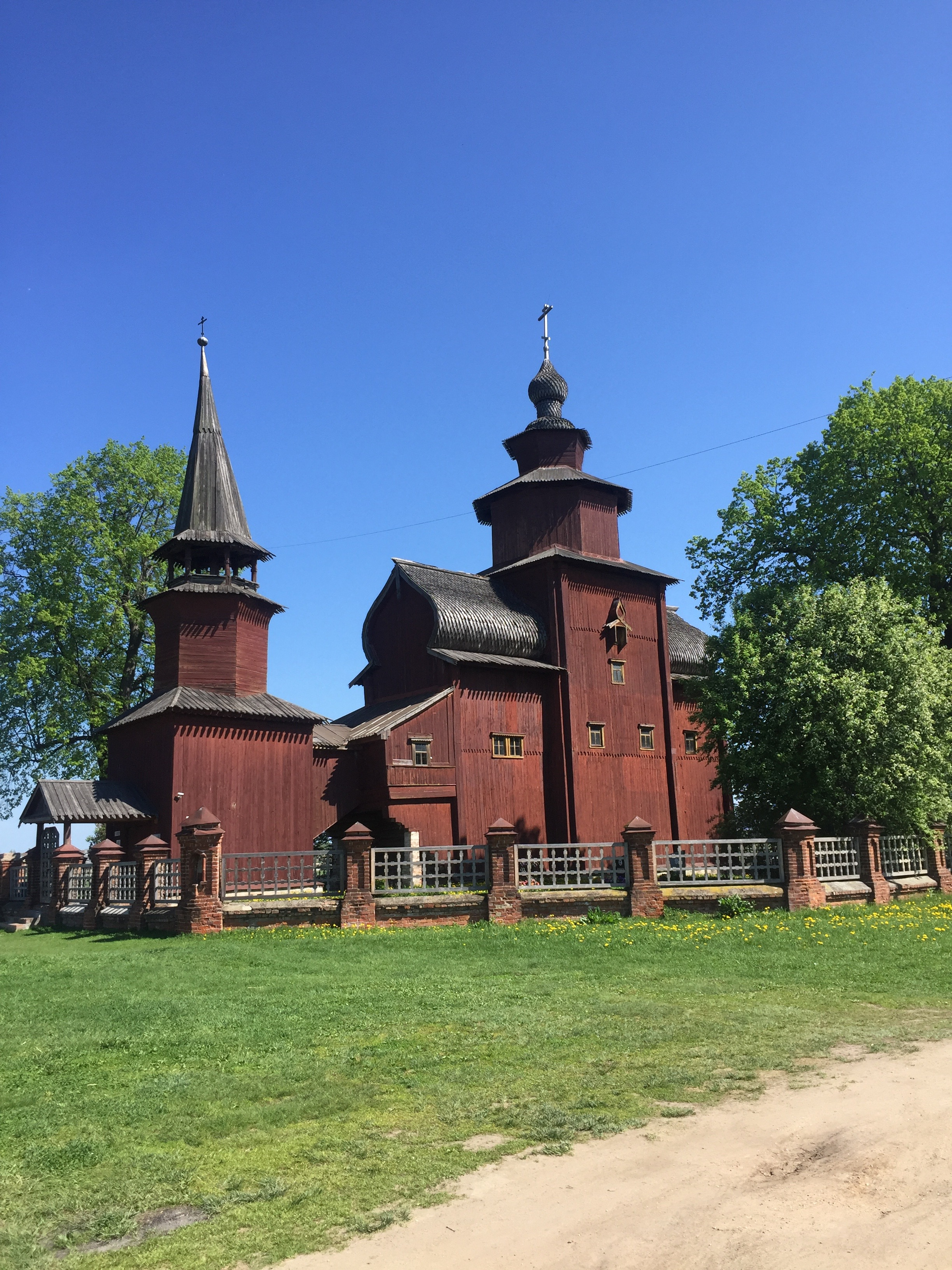
Ishnya Church (1687–1689)

The vicinity of Rostov is rich in old architecture. For example, an old wooden church (1687–1689) may be seen in Ishnya. One of the best preserved monasteries in Russia, named after the saints Boris and Gleb, is situated in Borisoglebsky, about 20 kilometers (12 mi) west of the town. The monastery was favored by Ivan the Terrible, who personally supervised the construction of towered walls and bell-tower around an even more ancient cathedral. The only addition made to the monastery after Ivan's death is a barbican church, commissioned by the metropolitan Iona Sysoyevich.

== Twin towns/sister cities ==
- Jämsä, Finland
- Stevens Point, Wisconsin, United States

== In popular culture ==
=== Films ===
- Peter I (Russian: Пётр Первый) (1937), by Vladimir Petov
- Ivan Vasilievich: Back to the Future (Russian: Иван Васильевич меняет профессию, Ivan Vasilievich Changes His Profession) (1973), by Leonid Gaidai

== Notable people ==
- Dmitry Borisovich (1253–1294), Russian nobleman
- Konstantin of Rostov (1186–1218), the eldest son of Vsevolod the Big Nest and Maria Shvarnovna
- Vasilko Konstantinovich (1209–1238), the first prince of Rostov
- Demetrius of Rostov (1651–1709), archbishop
- Olena Kryvytska (born 1987), Ukrainian fencer
- Lev Naumov (1925–2005), Russian classical pianist, composer and educator
- Yuri Alexandrovich Bilibin (1901–1952), geologist
- Aleksandr Safoshkin (born 1976) Russian gymnast
