= Igor Rybakov =

Russian businessman (born 1972)

- Игорь Рыбаков
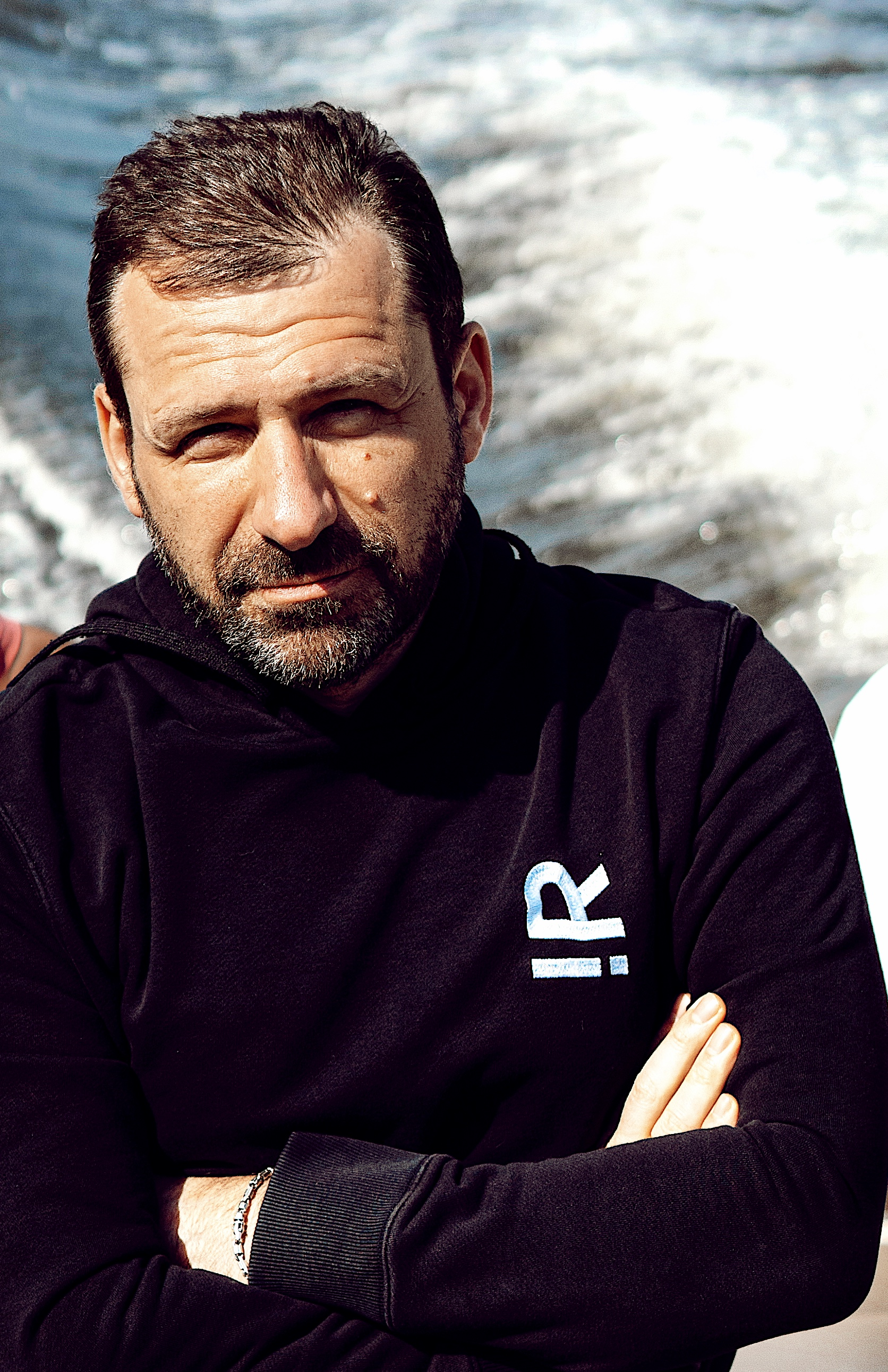
- Rybakov in 2020
- Born: 16 May 1972 (age 54); Magnitogorsk, Chelyabinsk Oblast, Soviet Union
- Education: Moscow Institute of Physics and Technology
- Known for: Co-founder of Technonicol
- Spouse: Ekaterina Rybakov
- Children: 4

Igor Vladimirovich Rybakov (Russian: Игорь Владимирович Рыбаков; born 16 May 1972) is a Russian businessman and co-founder of Technonicol, a manufacturer of construction materials. In September 2025, Rybakov held 1,513th position on the Forbes Real-Time Billionaires list, with an estimated net worth of $2.4 billion.

== Career ==
=== Business ===
Rybakov began his career in the construction industry in 1988 as a member of a student construction brigade during high school. While studying at the Moscow Institute of Physics and Technology, he continued working as a roofer with his roommate and classmate, Sergey Kolesnikov. In 1992, after the dissolution of the Soviet Union, the two co-founded Technonicol, a company that produces and distributes construction materials.

==== Technonicol ====
Technonicol was founded in 1993 as a trading company, supplying raw materials to factories and distributing finished products. The company opened its first office in Moscow and expanded throughout Russia and other CIS countries between 1994 and 1999.

By 2024, Technonicol reported a revenue of US$2.99 billion (256.4 billion rubles). The company operates 53 manufacturing sites in seven countries, namely, Russia, Belarus, Lithuania, the Czech Republic, Italy, the United Kingdom, and Germany. It also maintains 22 offices in 18 countries, as well as 18 training centers and six research centers.

Technonicol's sales network includes 90 offices across Russia and CIS countries, with its products distributed in 150 countries.

In 2018, Rybakov and Kolesnikov received the EY Entrepreneur Of The Year Award in Russia. They attended the international awards ceremony in Monaco in June 2019. That same year, Forbes listed Technonicol among the 200 largest private companies in Russia, ranking it 114th.

=== Literary works ===
Rybakov is the author of The Thirst (2017), a book about his business experiences. The book was recognized in PwC's "Business Book of the Year" competition in 2018.

=== Music and production ===
In 2019, Rybakov released a music album titled Summer Has Been Going Away (Russian: Уходило лето) and produced a short film called "Fair Play". He later released a second album, Audio Films, in 2020.

== Philanthropy ==
In 2015, Rybakov and his wife, Ekaterina, established the Rybakov Family Foundation, a non-profit organization that supports educational initiatives. The foundation created the Rybakov Prize, an award recognizing philanthropists in education, and set up endowment services to ensure long-term funding for educational causes. The foundation established the Rybakov Playschool, which focuses on early childhood education and the X10 Academy, which offers programs for entrepreneurs.

Other acts of philanthropy include the creation of an endowment for his former school with a US$1 million donation and the sponsoring of a monument honoring healthcare workers treating COVID-19 by the artist Alexey Sergienko.

== Personal life ==
Igor and his wife, Ekaterina, have four children. Their first child, a daughter, was born in 2000.

Rybakov runs a YouTube channel where he publishes content related to business and education.
