= Sergei Kolesnikov (businessman) =

Russian businessman

Sergei Anatolievich Kolesnikov
- Сергей Анатольевич Колесников
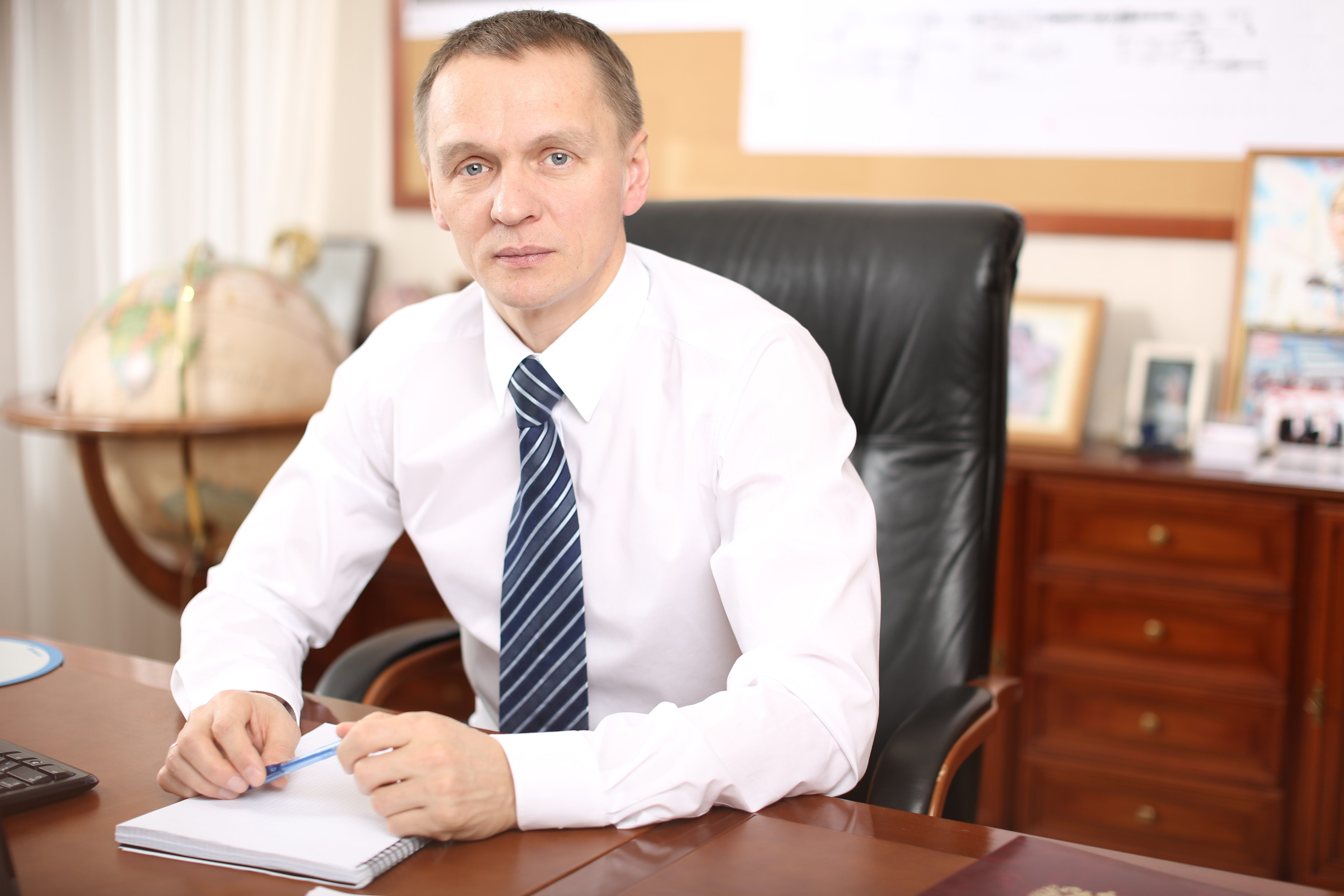
- Sergei Kolesnikov in 2017
- Born: February 25, 1972 (age 54); Ulyanovsk
- Education: Moscow Institute of Physics and Technology
- Occupation: Businessman
- Known for: Tecnonikol company

Sergei Anatolievich Kolesnikov (Russian: Сергей Анатольевич Колесников; born February 25, 1972) is a Russian billionaire, founder and owner of Technonicol company with Igor Rybakov.

== Biography ==
Sergei Kolesnikov was born on February 25, 1972, in Ulyanovsk.

He was educated at the Moscow Institute of Physics and Technology, graduated in 1995.

Since 2013 he has been working at Delovaya Rossiya, dealing with issues related to antitrust regulation.

In 2021 Kolesnikov confirmed his Maltese citizenship.

== Technonicol ==
Kolesnikov with Igor Rybakov founded the Technonicol company in 1992. The company was engaged in roof repairs.

In 1995 the partners acquired a controlling stake in the Vyborg Roofing Material Plant.

In 2001 Technonicol joined the Mida LT plant in Lithuania, in 2013 – the Italian plant Italiana Membrana, in 2014 – the plants Imper Italia and Eurodu.

Technonicol logo

As of 2018, Technonicol had 52 production sites in seven countries, supplying its products to 95 countries.

In 2024 Technonicol bought a plastic waste recycling plant in Tver from EcoPartners Group of companies.

Technonicol, which manufactures roofing and insulation materials, owns 70 manufacturing plants in eight countries around the world.

The company's headquarters are located in Moscow.

Year	Revenue, billion $
2016	▲70
2017	▲79,2
2018	▲94
2019	▲103,7
2020	▲112,9
2021	▲179
2022	179
2023	▲211
2024	▲256

== Other business ==
In 2014 25% of the share of the Canadian company Silver Bear was acquired by the company Inflation Management Corporation, the beneficiary of which is Sergei Kolesnikov.

== Wealth ==
In June 2025, his net worth was estimated at $2.4 billion.

In 2024 he ranked 92nd in the Forbes "125 Billionaires of Russia" rating.

== Sanctions ==
Since 2022 he has been on Ukraine's sanctions list due to a significant source of income for Russia.

In 2023 Poland imposed sanctions against Sergei Kolesnikov, including Polish structures of the Technonicol company, due to indirect support of activities threatening the territorial integrity, sovereignty and independence of Ukraine.

== Personal life ==
He is married and has 4 children.

He enjoys hiking, rafting, and biathlon.

Kolesnikov funds biathlon schools. He built two biathlon stadiums.

He also funded an ecopark near Ryazan, Russia. Its area is more than 500,000 square meters, including a hotel complex and biathlon track.

== Publications ==
In 2019 Sergei Kolesnikov, in collaboration with Igor Altshuler, published the book A trip to Europe, or New Horizons. about Technonicol's entry into the European market.
