= Rybakov Foundation =

Russian private philanthropic organization

- Рыбаков Фонд
- Rybakov Foundation logo
- Formation: 2015
- Founder: Igor Rybakov, Ekaterina Rybakova
- Founded at: Moscow, Russia
- Type: Non-profit organization
- Region served: Russia
- Fields: Socio-educational development, school community, prize philanthropy
- Official language: Russian, English
- President: Ekaterina Rybakova
- Website: https://rybakovfoundation.org/

The Rybakov Foundation (Russian: Рыбаков Фонд) is a private philanthropic organization, founded by Ekaterina Rybakova and Igor Rybakov in 2015. It operates in the fields of socio-educational development, school communities, and prize philanthropy, and may participate in both national and international partnerships.

== History ==
The foundation was established in December 2015 by Igor Rybakov and Ekaterina Rybakova. Rybakov has applied business management approaches to the governance of the organization’s activities. Initial focus areas included the development of education, support for entrepreneurship, and work with non-commercial entities. The Foundation also sponsored an annual #EdCrunch conference for new technologies in education.

In 2017, the foundation partnered with the Moscow City University, Projectoria NGO and the World Bank to launch Collab Challenge, a Scratch programming competition for secondary school students in Russia. In May 2017, the foundation and Higher School of Economics established a business accelerator program focused on technologies for philanthropy (PhilTech).

From 2015 to 2018, Ekaterina Rybakova and Igor Rybakov contributed 1 billion rubles to the Rybakov Foundation. In March 2019, they announced an additional contribution of 1 billion rubles.

In March 2019, Ekaterina Rybakova and Igor Rybakov presented the concept “School as the Center of Society,” which focused on socio-educational development and referenced the United Nations' Sustainable Development Goal 4. At the same time, the foundation announced the launch of the Rybakov Prize, an initiative supported by UNESCO Institute for Information Technologies in Education and the World Bank.

In February 2020, during the first Rybakov Prize ceremony, the founders announced a commitment of US$100 million over a ten-year period for educational development initiatives. During the COVID-19 pandemic, the Rybakov Foundation distributed laptops to 232 multi-child families across various regions.

== Major projects ==
=== School education ===
In 2016, Rybakov Foundation launched the #iTeacher annual all-Russian competition for educational innovators. The following year it launched “TOP School”, an all-Russian competition of school projects. In September 2019, the foundation merged two competitions into Rybakov School Award. In 2019, the award had 2,846 applications, 50 individual winners and 20 team (schools) winners.

=== Preschool education ===
In November 2016, Rybakov Foundation launched Rybakov Preschool Award, an annual award named after a prominent Soviet psychologist Lev Vygotsky, to support preschool education projects and individual educators. It is also known for its Summer School, an intensive professional development program for the competition's winners. The total award pool is 30 million rubles ($375,991).

=== Rybakov Prize ===
The Rybakov Prize was announced in March 2019 as an annual award in the field of educational philanthropy. The total prize fund is reported as US$1.2 million, with one grand prize and two additional awards.

In 2019, the prize received 460 applications from more than 40 countries. The jury consisted of representatives from international organizations, education institutions, and private sector entities. That year’s recipients included Abdul Abdulkerimov (Luminary Center), Olga Zubkova (Tetradka Druzhby National Association for the Development of Education), and Boris Bulayev (Educate!).

== Recognition ==
In 2016 the foundation was among top 9 non-profit organizations in Russia, according to Ogoniok magazine. In 2019 and 2020 it was among top 20 private non-profit organizations in Russia, according to Forbes Russia. In 2020, the Foundation ranked third in the list of private charity organizations in Russia, according to RAEX rating agency.

== International partnerships ==
Rybakov Foundation is a member of the European Venture Philanthropy Association (EVPA), and the Asian Venture Philanthropy Network (AVPN).

== Bibliography ==
- Cagney, Penelope, ed. (2018). Global Best Practices for CSO, NGO, and Other Nonprofit Boards: Lessons From Around the World. Wiley. p. 109. ISBN 9781119423201.
- Ntalianis, Klimis; Andreatos, Antonios; Sgouropoulou, Cleo (2018). Proceedings of the 17th European Conference on e-Learning. Academic Conferences and Publishing International Limited. p. 255. ISBN 978-1-912764-08-2.
- Четверикова, Ольга (2020). Цифровой тоталитаризм. Как это делается в России [Digital totalitarianism. How is this done in Russia] (in Russian). Litres. p. 136. ISBN 9785042305313.
- Romashov, Roman A.; Bryleva, Elena A. (2020). "55: Legal Regulation of Charitable Activities Carried Out with the Use of Digital Technologies". In Kolmykova, Tatiana; Kharchenko, Ekaterina V. (eds.). Digital Future Economic Growth, Social Adaptation, and Technological Perspectives. Springer Nature. p. 590. doi:10.1007/978-3-030-39797-5. ISBN 978-3-030-39796-8. S2CID 243164729.
